= List of Iranian Pahlevani armband holders =

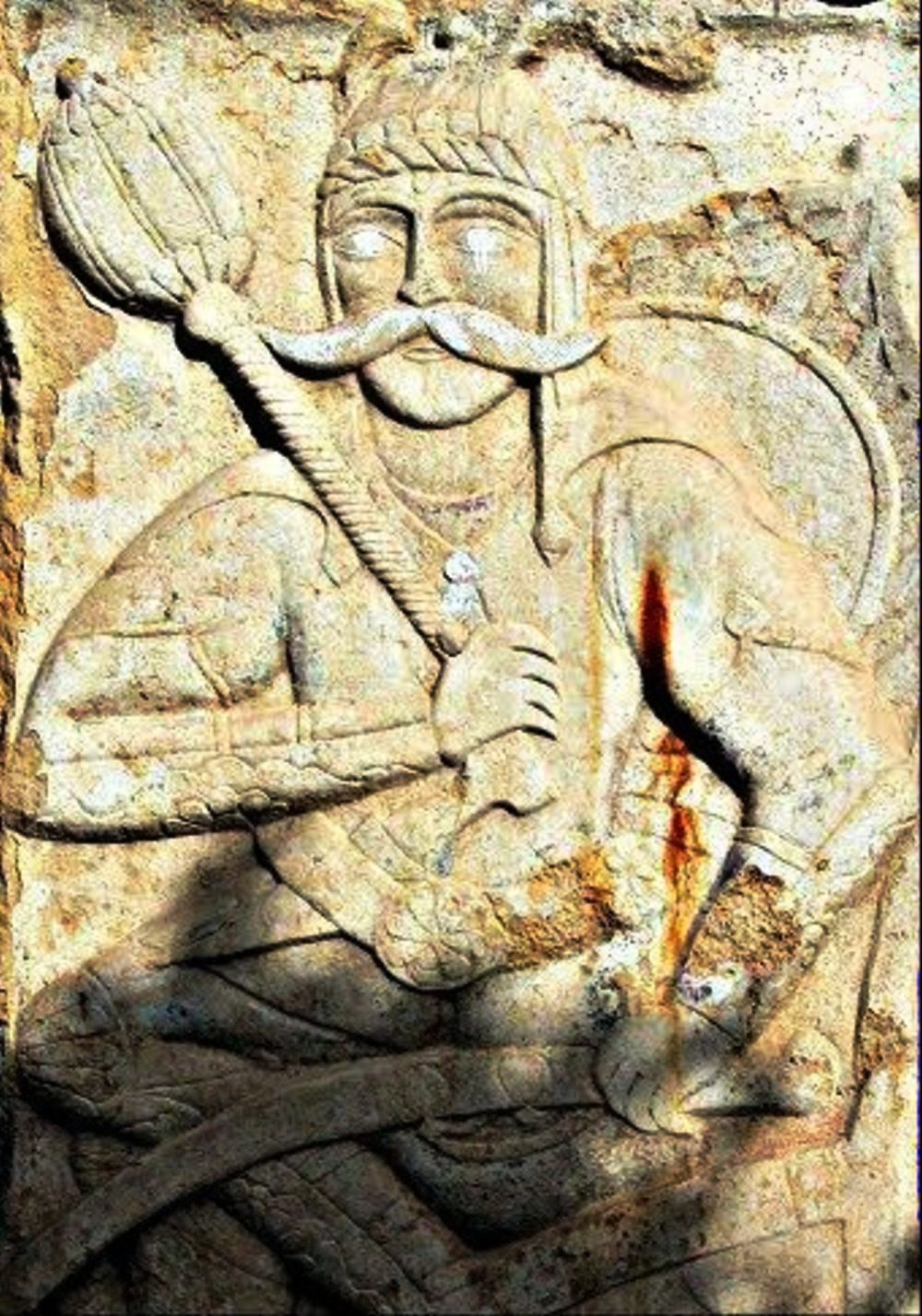
Pahlevan Musa Khamis Gorzdin Vand, a champion of Iran in the early Qajar era and commander of the Iranian army in the battle against the Ottoman Empire, known as "Pahlevan Gorzdin Vand".

The Pahlevani wrestling (Persian: رقابت‌های پهلوانی ایران) are traditional Iranian wrestling tournaments held annually across the country to determine the "Pahlevan of Iran". Competitors from across Iran participate to win the championship armband. Although these contests have ancient roots, their modern format has been held since 1944 (1323 AH). The winner is bestowed the title of Pahlevan and becomes the holder of the Pahlevani armband.

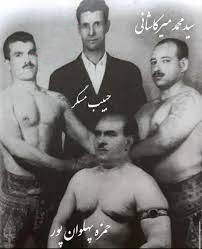
Pahlevan Hamzeh Pahlevanpour, 1940

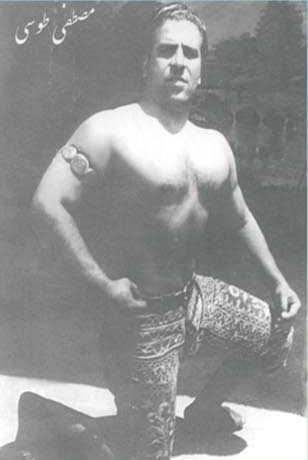
Mostafa Tusi, three-time Pahlevan champion (1944–1946)

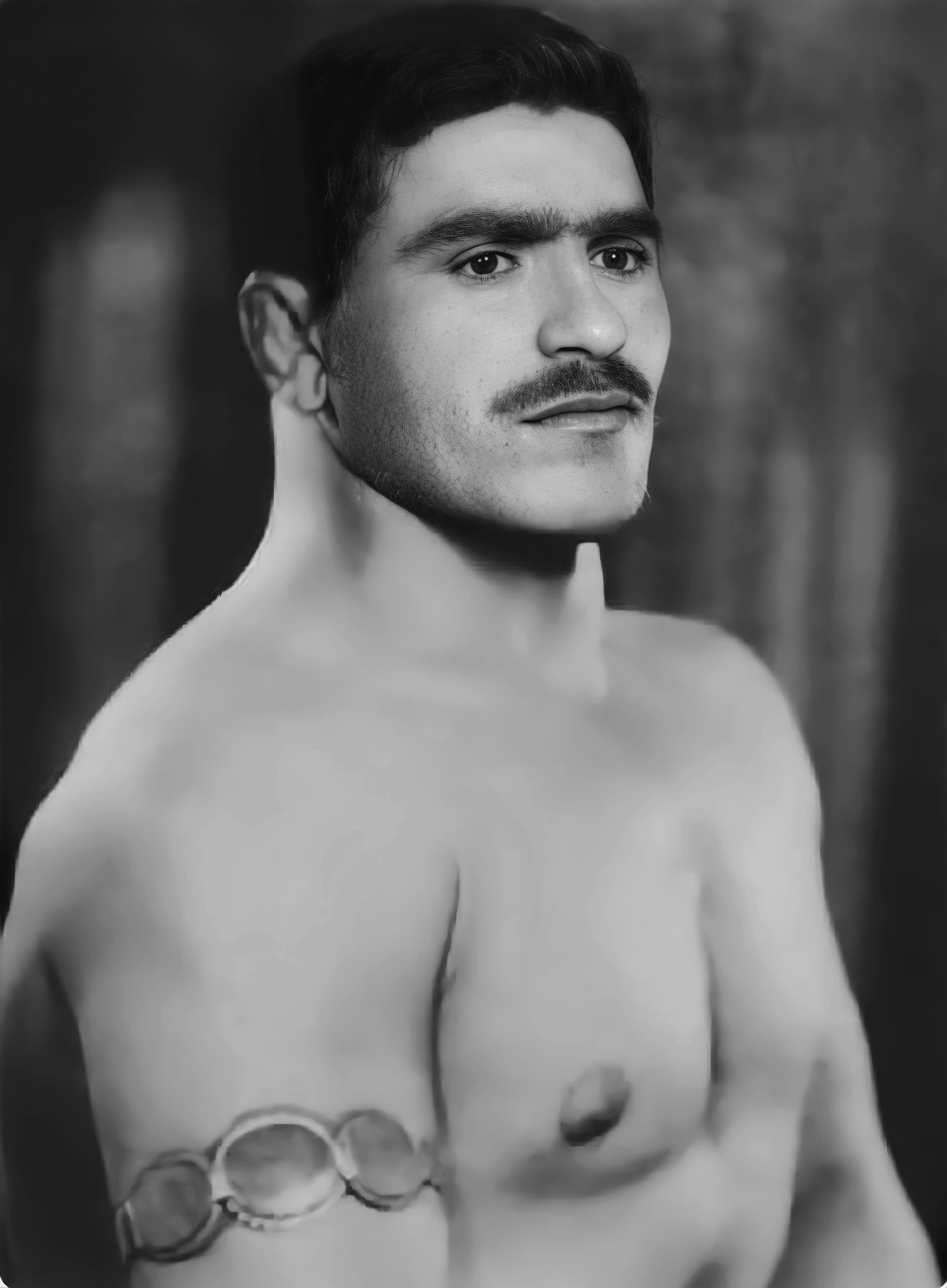
Pahlevan Ahmad Vafadar, three-time Pahlevan champion (1950–1952), known as the "Eternal Pahlevan of Iran"

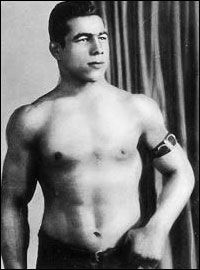
Gholamreza Takhti, three-time Pahlevan champion (1957–1959), nicknamed "Jahan Pahlevan".

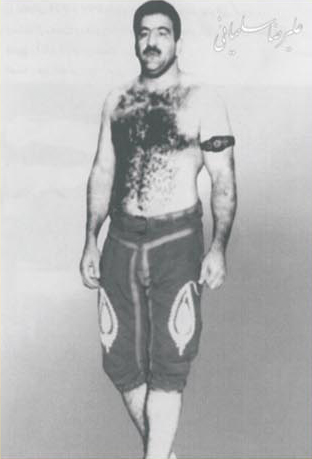
Alireza Soleimani, holder of the most Pahlevan titles with six championships (1979, 1982–1983, 1985–1986, 1990), known as "Pahlevanbashi".

== Antiquity of wrestling culture in Iran ==
Athletic and Pahlevani practices were part of daily life in ancient Iran. Society at that time highly esteemed athletes, who, with their strength and courage, were ready to defend their families and homeland when needed. Pahlevans held a special place in battles, sometimes deciding the fate of wars through single combat without full-scale clashes.

The term koshti (wrestling) derives from the belt kusti worn by Zoroastrians during prayers in front of the sacred fire. Koshti gereftan literally means "to take hold of each other's belt." Its Middle Persian form was kustik, and in Classical Persian it was goshti. The belt was tied three times around the waist, symbolizing the three principles of Zoroaster: "Good Thoughts, Good Words, Good Deeds".

In addition to Zoroastrian sources, Greek and Roman historians, as well as Ferdowsi's Shahnameh, testify to the deep roots of wrestling and Pahlevani culture in Iran.

== Pahlevani ethos ==
The appearance of Pahlevan stories in Persian literature and Iranian culture, the emergence of written or oral codes of conduct, acts of chivalry, and the oral transmission of Pahlevan tales across generations reflect their special role in Iranian history.

In the 14th century, the famous Pahlevan, mystic, and poet Puryay-e Vali integrated Pahlevani with Futuwwa and a form of Sufism. During the Safavid and Zand eras, Pahlevani wrestling enjoyed a golden age.

== Modern era ==
In the Qajar period, Naser al-Din Shah Qajar appointed a man named Saheb-od-Dowleh to promote Pahlevani wrestling. Until 1939, wrestling competitions were held according to Pahlevani traditions. From then onwards, modern sports culture emerged, and clubs were established. In 1944, at the suggestion of the National Physical Education Association, it was officially approved that Pahlevani wrestling competitions be held annually to select the national Pahlevan. The champion would keep the armband for one year, and if he won three consecutive times, he would retain it permanently. Notable champions include Ali Akbari from Kermanshah.

== Before the formalization of competitions ==
Pahlevans of Iran from the 13th century AH until before formalization:

- Pahlevan Fileh Hamadani (7th century AH)
- Pahlevan Mahmud ibn Valy al-Din Khwarazmi (Puryay-e Vali) (8th century AH)
- Pahlevan Mohammad Abu Sa'id (9th century AH)
- Pahlevan Nedaqi Araqi Esfahani (10th century AH)
- Pahlevan Beyg Qamari (10th century AH)
- Pahlevan Mirza Beyg Kashi (11th century AH)
- Pahlevan Kabir Esfahani (11th century AH)
- Pahlevan Hamzeh Ali Pahlevanpour (13th century AH)
- Musa Khamis Gorzdin Vand (early 13th century AH)
- Pahlevan Landareh Dooz
- Pahlevan Asgar Yazdi
- Pahlevan Mohammad Mazar
- Pahlevan Ebrahim Hallaj Yazdi (Yazdi Bozorg)
- Pahlevan Seyyed Ali
- Pahlevan Shaban Siah
- Haj Hassan Badafat
- Pahlevan Haj Nayeb Rezaqoli
- Pahlevan Hossein Golzar
- Pahlevan Akbar Khorasani
- Pahlevan Sadegh Qomi
- Pahlevan Mohammad Abdol Yazdi
- Pahlevan Abolqasem Qomi
- Pahlevan Seyyed Ali Haq-shenas Kamiyab
- Pahlevan Mohammad Sadegh Bolourforoush
- Pahlevan Seyyed Hassan Razzaz (Shuja'at) (from the 13th century AH onwards)
- Pahlevan Qasem Ghaffari ("Qasem Kotol")
- Pahlevan Hamzeh Ali Pahlevanpour, the first Pahlevan of the Pahlavi dynasty, awarded the armband by both Reza Shah Pahlavi and Mohammad Reza Pahlavi.

== Official Competitions ==
Pahlevans holding the Iranian Pahlevani armband after the officialization of the Pahlevani wrestling championships (since 1944)

1. Mostafa Toosi (1944, 1945, 1946) – The first official Pahlevani armband was permanently awarded to Pahlevan Mostafa Toosi after winning the national Pahlevani wrestling title for three consecutive years. In 1945, the final bout between Toosi and Abolghasem Sokhdari lasted for two days.
2. Ziaeddin Mirqavami (1947) – Won the title in May 1947 in the absence of Mostafa Toosi.
3. Abolghasem Sokhdari (1948) – A renowned wrestler from Khorasan Province, Sokhdari had lost close matches to Toosi in 1944 and 1945 but eventually claimed the national title in 1948.
4. Abbas Zandi (1949, 1953, 1954, 1955) – Known as the youngest Pahlevan of Tehran, Zandi became champion at age 18. He later won gold at the 1954 World Championships and held the Pahlevani title three more times.
5. Ahmad Vafadar (1950, 1951, 1952) – A famed Chookheh wrestler from Khorasan, he dominated the heavyweight division in freestyle wrestling and competed in multiple World Championships and Olympics.
6. Mohammad Ebrahim Mofidi (1956) – A sportsman from Shemiran, Mofidi won the Pahlevani title in his only year of competition.
7. Gholamreza Takhti (1957, 1958, 1959) – Nicknamed Jahan Pahlevan (World Champion), a title also attributed to the mythical hero Rostam in the Shahnameh, Takhti became an unparalleled legend in Iranian sports, winning seven Olympic and World medals in addition to his three consecutive Pahlevani titles.
8. Yaqoubali Shorvarzi (1961) – Another champion from Khorasan, Shorvarzi won in 1961; the competition was not held in 1960.
9. Mansour Mahdizadeh (1962, 1965) – Defeated Aziz Kiani in the 1962 final; also a two-time freestyle wrestling world champion.
10. Reza Sokhteh-Saraei (1975) – From Mazandaran Province, he won the title by defeating Alireza Soleimani in the final.
11. Alireza Soleimani (1979, 1982, 1983, 1985, 1986, 1990) – The most decorated Pahlevan with six national titles, earning the honorary title of Pahlevan Bashi.
12. Mohammad Hassan Mohbi (1984, 1988) – The first champion from Kermanshah Province, breaking the dominance of Tehran and Khorasan athletes.
13. Mohammad Reza Topchi (1987, 1989) – Reached multiple finals before finally winning in these two years.
14. Majid Ansari (1991) – Won in a year when many national team members skipped the competition.
15. Ayoub Bani Nosrat (1992, 1993) – A freestyle national team member from Azerbaijan (Iran).
16. Mahmoud Mihan (1994–1997) – A national judo team member whose background in Chookheh and leg-hook techniques helped him dominate for four years.
17. Hamid Ghashang (1998, 1999, 2002) – A tall Khorasani wrestler skilled in leg-hook techniques.
18. Mahmoud Mohammadi (2000) – Won the title at age 19, also a world and Asian junior champion.
19. Amin Rashid Lemir (2001, 2008) – Grandson of Yaqoubali Shorvarzi.
20. Abdolreza Karegar (2003, 2004) – A Khorasani champion and former junior world gold medalist in freestyle wrestling.
21. Shahrokh Sedaghatzadeh (2006) – From Mazandaran, excelled in local wrestling styles before winning the 96 kg Pahlevani title.
22. Fardin Masoumi (2007) – A Gile-mard wrestler from Gilan Province, also a national freestyle team member.
23. Arash Mardani (2009, 2010, 2011)
24. Jaber Sadeghzadeh (2012, 2015, 2016, 2017, 2018, 2019, 2021) – Held the title seven times, earning the title Pahlevan Bashi.
25. Ahmad Mirzapour (2013)
26. Parviz Hadi (2014) – Heavyweight freestyle champion at the Asian Games, from East Azerbaijan Province.

== See also ==
- Wrestling
- Pahlevani wrestling
- Pahlevan
