= Chaharshanbe Suri =

Iranian festival

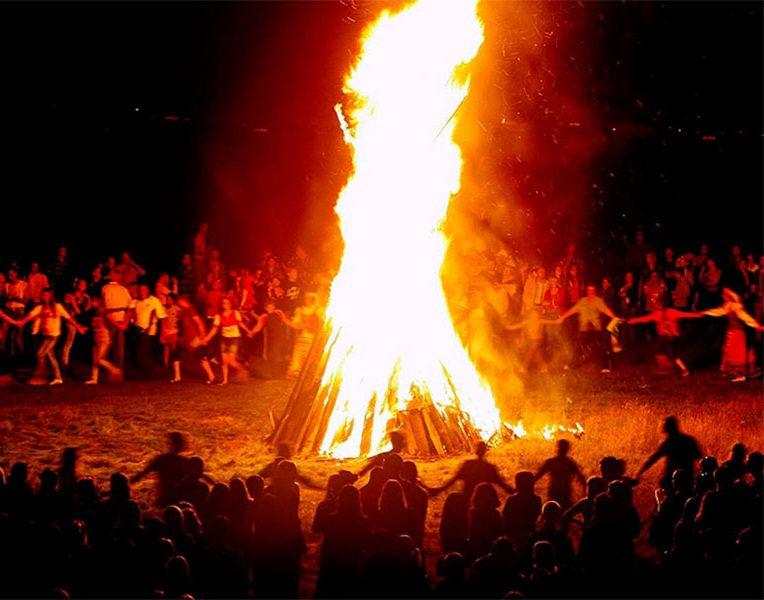
- Charshanbe Suri in Iran.
- Also called: Charshambe Soori
- Observed by: Iran; Kurdistan; Afghanistan (formerly); Iraq; Kazakhstan; Syria; Azerbaijan; Turkey
- Type: National, ethnic, cultural
- Date: The last eve between Tuesday and Wednesday of the year, before the vernal equinox
- 2025 date: 18 March
- 2026 date: 17 March
- 2027 date: 16 March
- Frequency: Annual
- Related to: Nowruz, Sizdebedar

Chaharshanbeh Suri or Charshanbeh Suri or Chahar-shanbe suri (Persian: چهارشنبه‌سوری, romanized: Čahāršanbe suri, pronounced čāršambe suri; lit. 'The Scarlet Wednesday' or 'Feast of the last Wednesday of the year'), is an Iranian festival of the fire dance celebrated on the eve of the last Wednesday of the year, of ancient Zoroastrian origin. Since the event takes place in the final week of the year, it can also be regarded as a prelude to the New Year celebration of Nowruz.

At the center of the holiday are rituals about purification and renewal that mark the transition from winter to spring. The most important custom is the lighting of bonfires in yards, village squares, city streets, rooftops, and hilltops. People jump over the flames while saying the phrase "your redness for my paleness". The idea behind this is that the fire takes away illness, weakness and bad luck, and instead gives people strength and energy.

Other traditions take place during the evening. One is "spoon-banging", where people disguise themselves and knock on neighbours' doors while banging spoons on bowls, asking for snacks. This custom is similar to the Halloween tradition of trick-or-treating. Another custom is a type of fortune-telling that involves opening a book of poems by Hafez and interpreting a random verse, or based on pieces of paper. People also eat ajeel, a mixture of dried fruits and nuts that is believed to bring good luck or help wishes come true, and later in the evening, customary dishes such as polow.

Since the Islamic Republic was established in 1979, Chaharshanbe Suri has also taken on political significance in Iran. The country's theocratic government has discouraged the celebration, arguing that its ancient Iranian origins are a "pagan relic". Because of this tension, the festival sometimes becomes a political event, with large public gatherings serving as opportunities for anti-regime demonstrations.

== Etymology ==
The Persian name of the festival consists of čahāršanbe (چهارشنبه), the Persian word for Wednesday, and suri (سوری). While suri may elsewhere be used to mean "celebration", in this context it means "scarlet", as used in Classical Persian and some modern regional dialects of Iran, referring to the red hue of fire.

The names of the festival in other languages include Azerbaijani Axır Çərşənbə (in Ardabil and Tabriz), Kurdish Kola Čowāršamba and Čowāršama Koli (in Kurdistan), Qara Chuarshanba (in Piranshahr) and Isfahani Persian Čāršambe Sorxi (in Isfahan). The importance of fire is evident in the stone inscriptions of the Achaemenid kings, and the very first mantra of the Rig Veda is in praise of fire. Chaharshanbe Suri and Holi share roots in ancient Aryan religions.

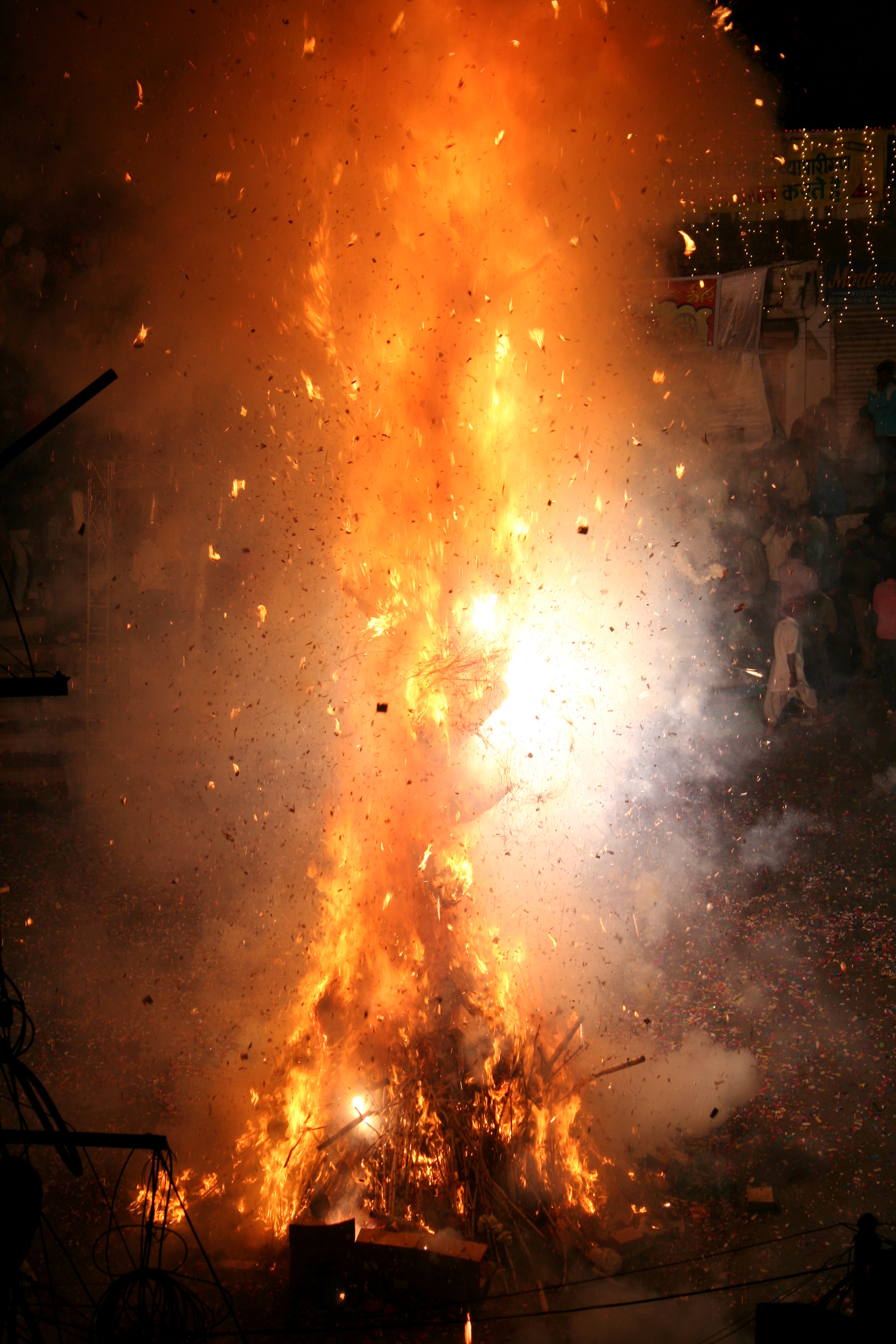
Holika bonfire in Udaipur, Rajasthan, Northern India, 2010.

== Observances ==
=== Jumping over the fire ===
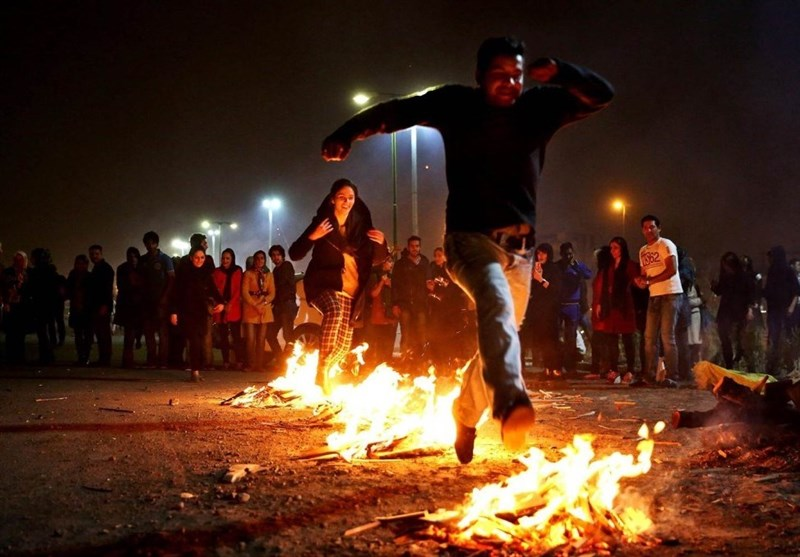
Jumping over the fire; Tehran, March 2018.

People collect brushwood in an open, unrestricted outdoor area prior to the festival's commencement. At sunset, after making one or more bonfires, they jump over the flames, singing sorkhi-ye to az man, zardi-ye man az to, literally meaning "[let] your redness [be] mine, my paleness yours", or a local equivalent of it. This is considered a purification practice.

=== Spoon-banging ===
Charshanbe Suri includes a custom similar to trick-or-treating that is called qāšoq-zani (قاشق‌زنی), literally translated as "spoon-banging". It is observed by people wearing disguises and going door-to-door to hit spoons against plates or bowls and receive packaged snacks.

=== Fortune telling (fāl) ===
Another popular practice on Chaharshanbe Suri is fortune telling from a jug (fāl-e kūza, fāl-e bolūnī), usually one with a wide mouth (bolūnī). Everyone present puts an ornament—a ring, bracelet, an earring—that he or she has been wearing into the jug. Then slips of paper inscribed with verses or sentences containing auguries—the number of slips must equal the number of people present—are put into the jug. A young child is assigned to reach into the jug and pull out one piece of paper and give it to the most learned or literate man in the party. Then the child pulls one of the ornaments from the jug. The man reads aloud the verse on the piece of paper, and the owner of the ornament learns from it what his or her fortune will be. In many places, including Isfahan and towns in central Iran, it is customary to take the fortunes from a copy of the dīvān of Ḥāfeẓ, rather than from pieces of paper. The reader chooses a verse at random as the fortune for the owner of the object taken from the pot. At Isfahan a small mirror and a box of collyrium, which supposedly bring good luck, are added to the ornaments in the jug (for similar customs connected with the first evening of winter, Šab-e Čella, see Enjavī, e.g., I, pp. 26, 126; II, p. 165).

=== Burning rue (esfand) ===
Burning rue seeds (Persian: اسفند, romanized: esfand; Tajik: испанд, romanized: ispand) or frankincense (kondor) at parties on the eve of Chaharshanbe Suri is a widespread practice in most regions of Persia, being considered a necessary precaution against the evil eye and malevolent spirits, devils, and genies (cf. above on fumigation to avoid the evil eye). While rue and a small amount of salt are thrown on the fire the people recite rhymes, which, though varying with the local dialects, usually go something like this: “Rue shrubs and rue seeds (esfandūne, i.e., esfand-dāna), rue shrubs with thirty-three seeds (dūne), rue shrubs know themselves; let them blast (be-tarkūne, i.e., be-tarakānad) the jealous eye” (or “the evil eye”).

=== Dropping the sash (šāl-andāzī) ===
On the eve of Chaharshanbe Suri (and also on Šab-e Čella, see, e.g., Enjavī, I, p. 25) a young man who wishes to know his chances with a particular girl fastens a rope, a sash, or a long piece of cloth to a basket and, accompanied by a member of his family, drops it through an opening or chimney of the girl’s home or drapes it from her roof or over the door. Holding one end of the rope, he hides, and when he feels a slight tug he reels in the basket to find what the head of the girl’s family has put in it (or tied to the rope); from this object he can judge whether or not the family looks on him with favor. Sometimes he puts a present for the girl in the basket—an apple, a pomegranate, an egg, or some other village product; if the girl takes his present out of the basket, it is a sign of acceptance. In some villages this ritual is performed merely as a means of fortune telling. It is popular mainly in northern regions of Iran (Azerbaijan, Āstārā, Gīlān, Zanjān, Qazvīn, Sāva, Āštīān).

=== Wish-granting snacks (Ajil-e Chaharshanbe Suri) ===
Persian tradition holds that eating a special mix of sweet and sour nuts and fruit, called Ajeel e Chaharshanbe Suri, on Chaharshanbe Suri makes wishes come true. It is a mixture of nuts and dried fruits, such as pistachios, almonds, chickpeas, and raisins.

== Historical background ==
=== Ancient origin ===
The festival has its origin in ancient Iranian rituals. The ancient Iranians celebrated the festival of Frawardigan, the last five days of the year in honor of the spirits of the dead, which is today referred to as Farvardinegan. They believed that the spirits of the dead would come for reunion. The seven holy immortals (Aməša Spənta) were honored, and were bidden a formal ritual farewell at the dawn of the New Year. The festival also coincided with festivals celebrating the creation of fire and humans. By the time of the Sasanian Empire, the festival was divided into two distinct pentads, known as the lesser and the greater panje. The belief had gradually developed that the "lesser panje" belonged to the souls of children and those who died without sin, while the "greater panje" was for all souls.

=== Qajar Persia ===
A custom once in vogue in Tehran was to seek the intercession of the so-called "Pearl Cannon" (Tup-e Morvārid) on the occasion of Chaharshanbe Suri. This heavy gun, which was cast by the foundry-man Ismāil Isfahāni in 1800, under the reign of Fath-Ali Shah of the Qajar dynasty, became the focus of many popular myths. Until the 1920s, it stood in Arg Square, to which the people of Tehran used to flock on the occasion of Charshanbe Suri. Spinsters and childless or unhappy wives climbed up and sat on the barrel or crawled under it, and mothers even made ill-behaved and troublesome children pass under it in the belief that doing so would cure their naughtiness. These customs died out in the 1920s, when the Pearl Cannon was moved to the Army's Officers' Club. There was also another Pearl Cannon in Tabriz. Girls and women used to fasten their dakhils, pieces of a paper or cloth inscribed with wishes and prayers, to its barrel on Charshanbe Suri. In times, the cannon had been used as a sanctuary for political or non-political fugitives to be immune to arrest or to protest from family problems.

Sadegh Hedayat, an Iranian writer of prose fiction and short stories, published a book, Tup-e Morvārid, in reference to the cannon that criticizes the old beliefs in Iranian folklore. The book also mentions the origin of the Pearl Cannon.

=== Modern era ===
Today, the Pearl Cannon is placed in the opening of Building Number 7 of the Ministry of Foreign Affairs at 30th Tir Avenue. The Ministry of Cultural Heritage, Handicrafts and Tourism is still in talks with the ministry to remove the gun to a museum.

In Stockholm, Sweden, the Eldfesten annual festival is one of the largest Chaharshanbe Suri concerts and festivals in the world and is broadcast nationally on Sveriges Television and internationally on Manoto.

== Food of Chaharshanbe Suri ==
Families customarily enjoy snacks during the evening and a supper at night after the end of the festivities. The usual snacks are nuts and dried fruits (ājīl), including salted hazelnuts, pistachios, almonds, prunes, apricots, and raisins. The supper depends on available local ingredients. In Kermān and Shirāz the main dish is usually polow with pasta soup; the longer the pasta strands, the better the chances for a long life for each member of the family. In Māzandarān, Gorgān, Gīlān, and Tehran, sabzī-polow with fish is most often eaten. In Qazvīn and Garmsār sabzī-polow is made with wild herbs from the desert. In Khorasan several kinds of polow (with lentils, pasta, herbs, and vetch) are traditionally served.

== Relations to other holidays ==
Although the name is linguistically identical to Çarşema Sor, the Persian Red Wednesday is more akin to the Kurdish Black Wednesday (Çarşema Reş; also called Qereçarşem, Axirçarşem) which are celebrations falling before the spring equinox. Observed primarily in the North, in some regions it is considered to be the last Wednesday before Nevroz, while in others it is the last Wednesday of February. The difference of historical calendars have made the date somewhat uncertain (since Kurds in the North used to observe the Rumi calendar, which was 13 days behind), but it is generally considered to be the three Wednesdays before Nevroz instead of one day. In most regions it is also called Çarşema Zîpê/an ("Wednesday of the Zîp/s"), which corresponds to the last cold week of winter, usually starting around 10-11th of March, called Serma Pîrê (lit. "Old Lady's Cold") or Zîp (compare Arabic برد العجوزة/Bard al 'Ajūzah meaning "cold of the old woman", and Turkish kocakarı soğuğu). In this tradition, the Black Wednesday falls on the Wednesday around the start of Zîp, and two Wednesdays before it are also part of the celebration period, climaxing at the 3rd. In Çarşema Zîp family and friends come together and enemies make peace, various extravagant costumes are worn and children may mark their faces with coal or similar substances and apply makeup to appear frightening. Because of this it has sometimes been referred to as "Kurdish Halloween". Music is played, parades take place in the squares and people go to graveyards to visit the dead. It is believed whatever action done during this day will be fixed for the entirety of next year, hence why nobody should fight during it.

== Chaharshanbe Suri as a symbol of resistance ==
Chaharshanbe Suri celebrations often create tension between the Iranian public and the government, which perceives them as an ideological and security threat. The holiday is regarded by Iran's religious authorities as a non-Islamic and superstitious practice that should be eliminated. Iranian authorities take measures each year to restrict the celebrations, arrest participants, and issue public warnings about the dangers of attending these events.

In some cases, the events serve as an opportunity for expressing dissent against the government, with protesters using the celebrations to chant political slogans and demonstrate their opposition.

== Gallery ==
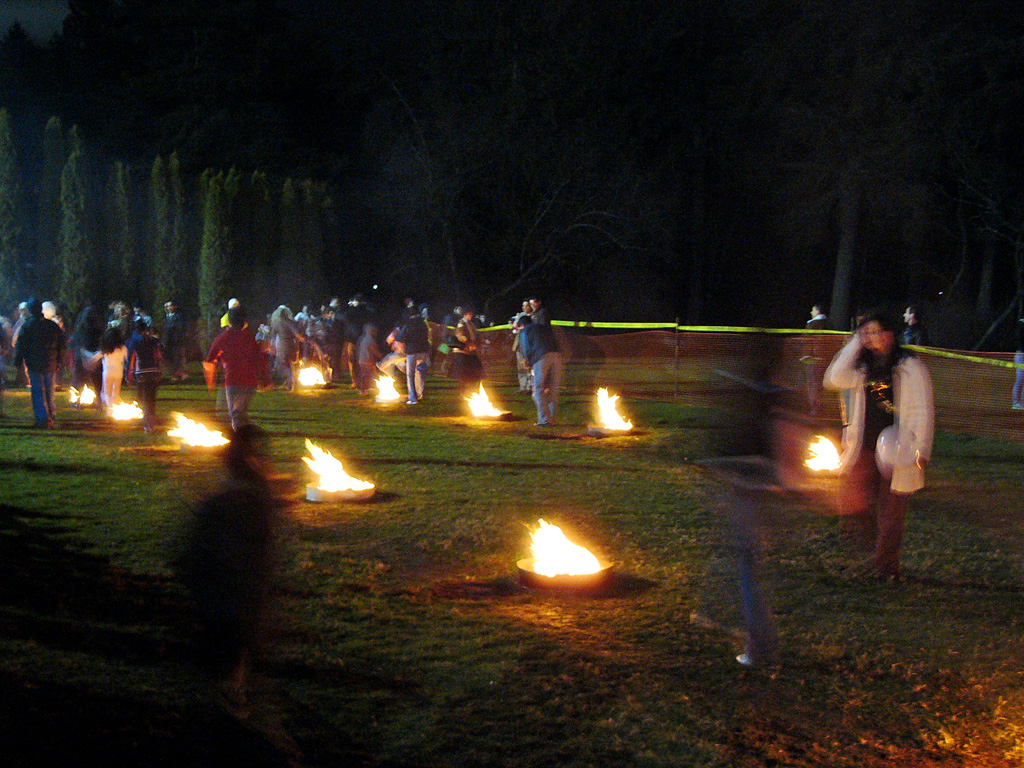
Charshanbe Suri in Vancouver, March 2008.

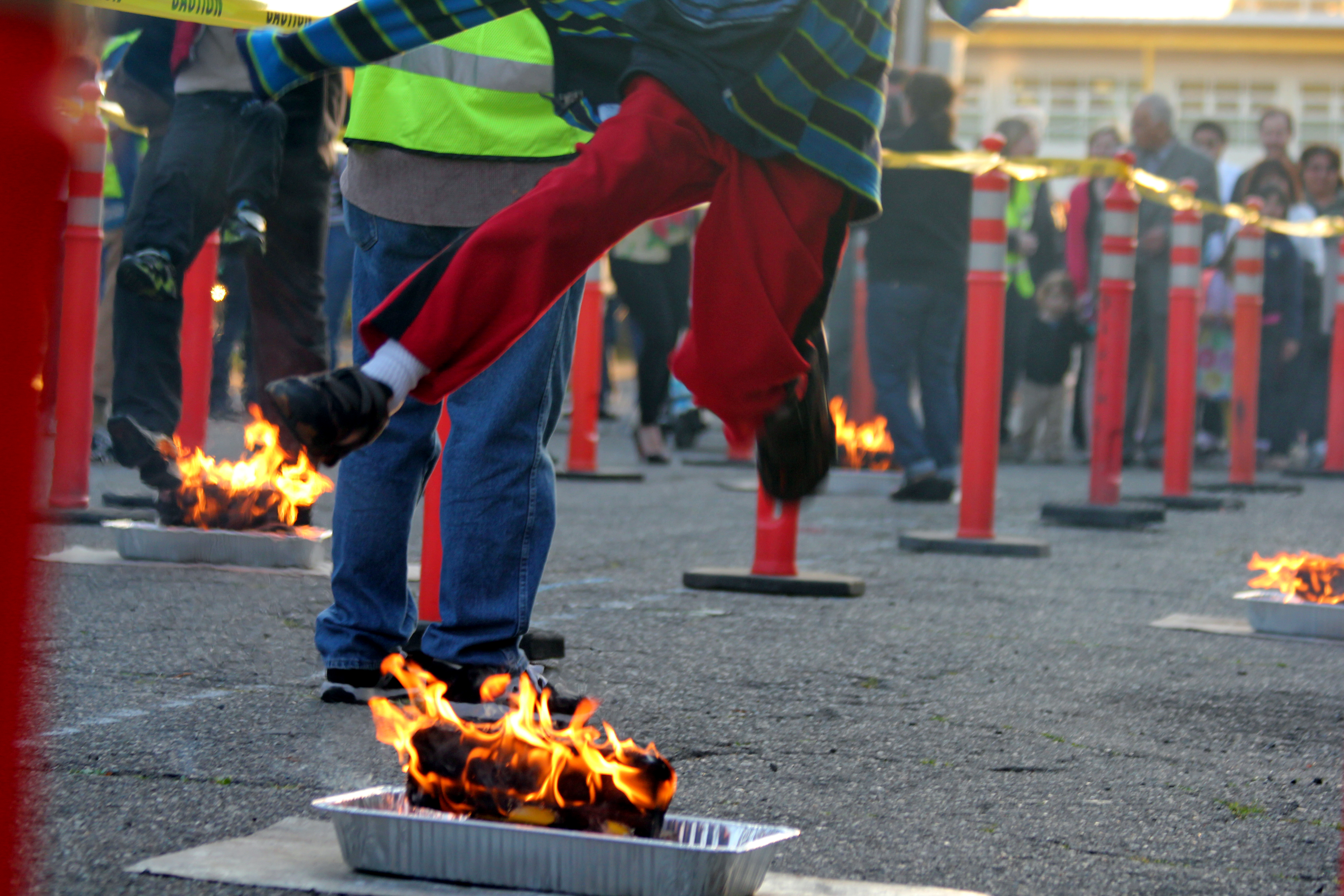
Charshanbe Suri in Berkeley, California, March 2013.

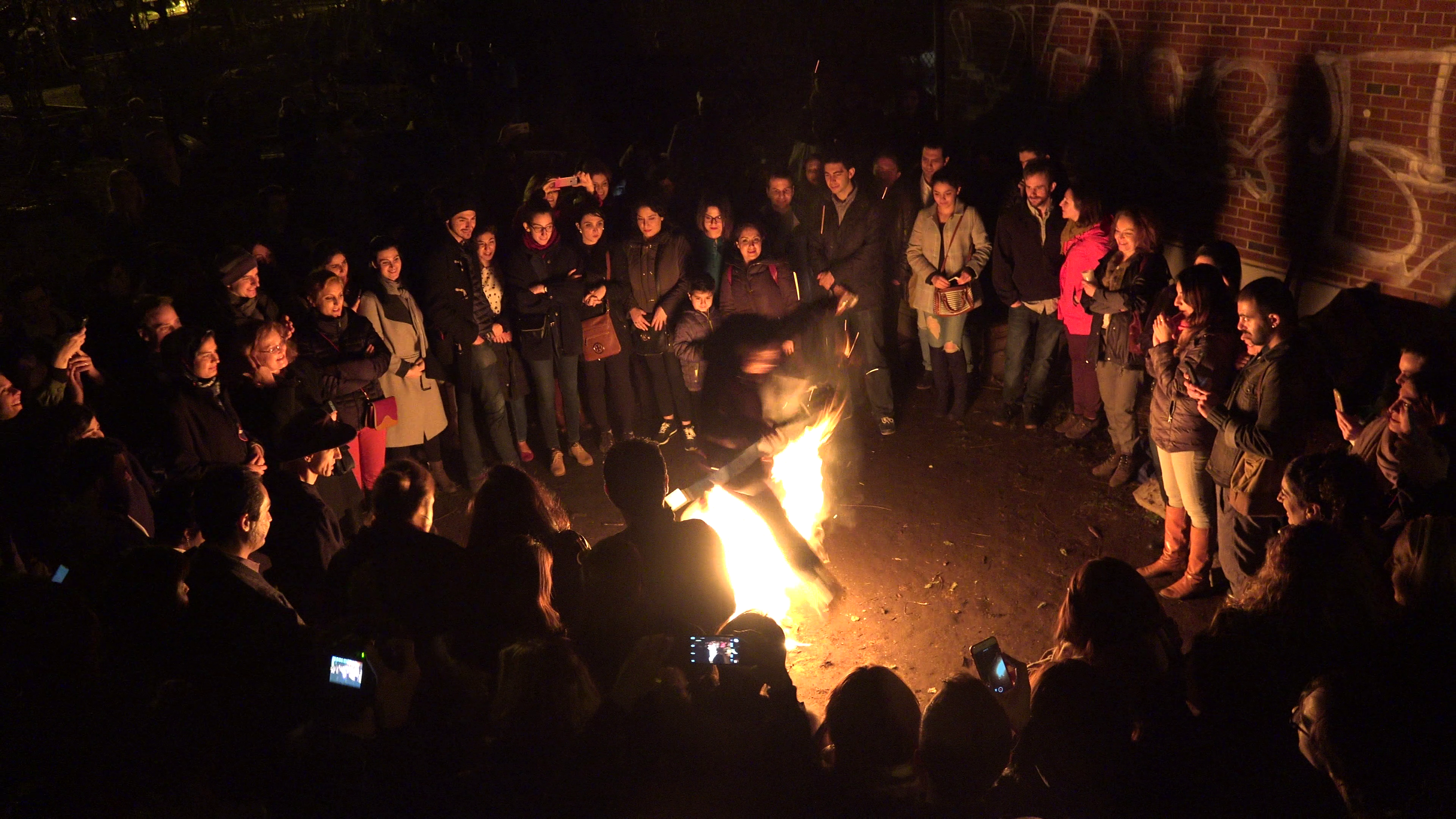
Charshanbe Suri in New York City, March 2016.

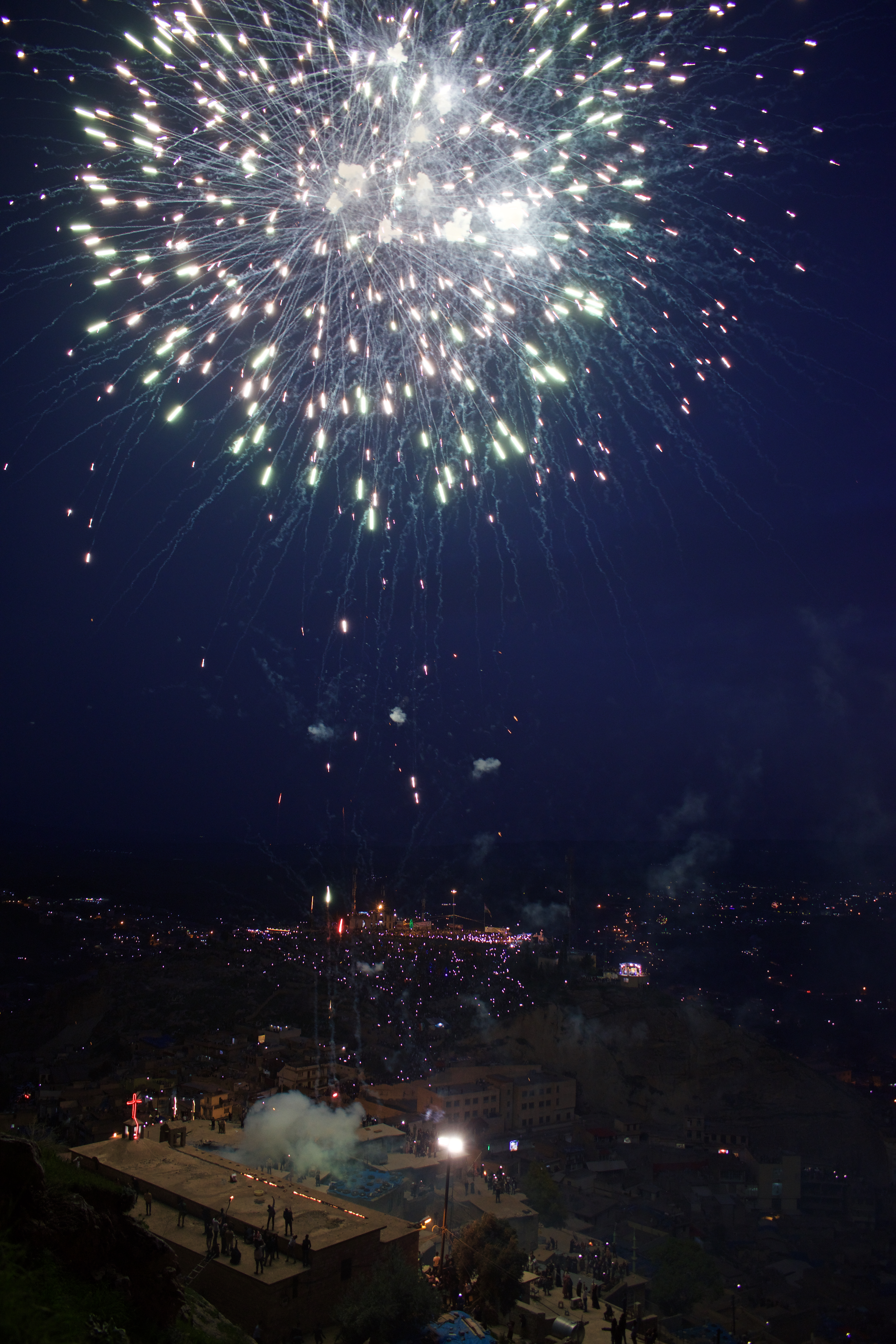
2018 Charshanbe Suri fireworks in Akre.

== See also ==
- Fāl-gūsh
- Yaldā Night
- Kupala Night
- Trndez
- Jaanipäev
- Atar
- Holika Dahan
- Easter fire
- Bonfire Night
