= Pahlevan =

Persian heroic and athletic title

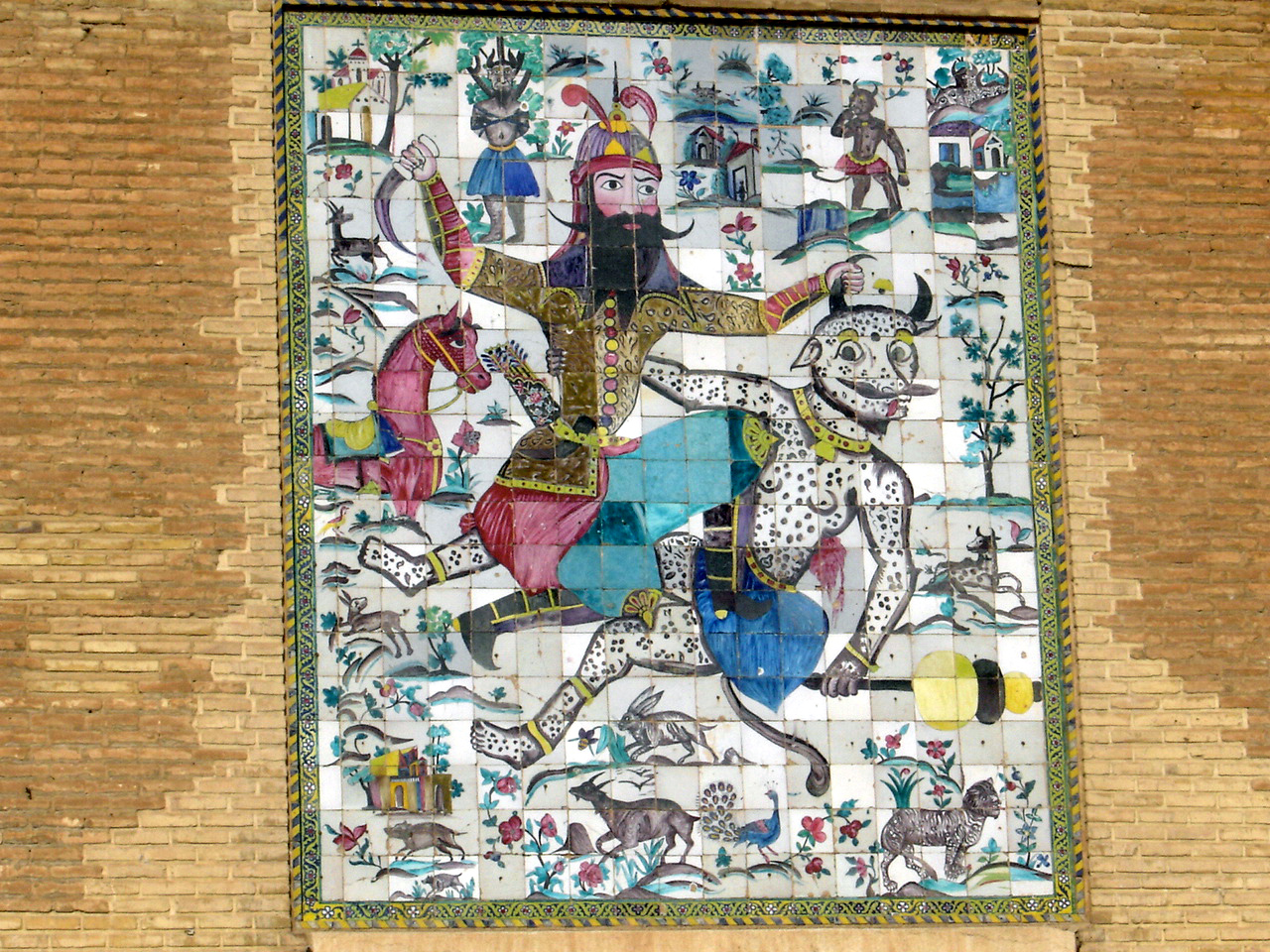
Depiction of the battle between Rostam and Div-e Sepid, Arg of Karim Khan, Shiraz

The term Pahlevan (Persian: پهلوان) is a Persian designation historically used across parts of West Asia to describe certain professional athletes. More than a sporting title, it embodied a moral ideal known as pahlevani, characterized by virtues such as justice, defending the vulnerable, selflessness, and resistance against tyranny.

Etymologically, pahlevan derives from Pahlav combined with the suffix -an, referring to the Pahla region and its people, who were famed for their strength and bravery. Their traditions an amalgam of chivalry and valor became known among Iranians as the "pahlevani tradition" and deeply influenced Iranian social life and epic storytelling.

== Prominent historical and legendary figures bearing the title pahlevan include ==
- Garshasp
- Rostam ("Jahan Pahlevan" – World Champion)
- Kay Khosrow
- Esfandiyar
- Fileh Hamedani
- Puriya-ye Vali
- Musa Khamis Garzadin Vand
- Ebrahim Hallaj Yazdi
- Hossein Golzar
- Akbar Khorasani
- Hamzeh Ali Pahlevanpour – first national pahlevan of the Pahlavi era and founder of the Pahlevanpour Zurkhaneh
- Hossein Golzar of Kermanshah
- Ali Agha Javidan of Kermanshah
- Seyed Ali Haghnashnas Kamiyab (1906–1973)
- Ahmad Vafadar (1927–2004)
- Gholamreza Takhti (1930–1968), celebrated in wrestling circles as "Jahan Pahlevan"
- Yaghoubali Shorvarzi (1923–1999)
- Khalil Oghab (1924–2023)
- Rasoul Khadem

== Titles and ranks ==
Traditional pahlevani culture recognized a variety of ranks and honorifics:

Pahlevan of the Nation

Awarded to the wrestler who defeated all other contenders, culminating in a final bout before the monarch.

Crowned Pahlevan

A title for those who combined wrestling mastery and physical prowess with a reputation for integrity, and who had embraced the spiritual discipline of futuwwa. Through a ritual led by a Morshed (master) and spiritual mentor, they were granted the "Crown of Poverty".

Bad-oft

A wrestler who, in facing a formidable opponent, demonstrated stubborn resistance and made the contest unusually difficult.

Counter-Move Specialist

A technical expert capable of neutralizing each maneuver of the opponent, forcing them into a defensive struggle.

Strongman Pahlevan

Typically among the most robust traditional athletes, these individuals honed their bodies through training with heavy apparatus and performed feats of strength for high-ranking dignitaries or in public venues, often as a profession.

Konfat-Kon Pahlevan

A wrestler without formal rank who nonetheless showed determination against renowned opponents, sometimes using cunning or unsportsmanlike tactics to tarnish their rival’s reputation.

Straw Pahlevan

An imposing figure in appearance but lacking skill or courage—one who had not competed seriously, yet claimed great prowess and boasted of defeating famous rivals in words alone.

== Pahlevani Armband of Iran ==
The pahlevani wrestling championship of Iran, aimed at selecting the "Pahlevan of Iran," is an annual sporting event in which athletes from across the country compete for the prestigious armband. While its origins trace back to ancient times, the competition has been held in its current format since 1944 (1323 SH).

Winners receive the title Pahlevan and the Pahlevani Armband. Holders of the Pahlevani Armband enjoyed not only athletic prestige but also notable social standing among the general public.

== See also ==
- List of Iranian Pahlevani armband holders

== Sources ==
- Afshari, Mehrān. "Pahlevan". زوج يلحس عربية صغيرة ناعمة زي القطن بين فخذيها نار. Encyclopaedia of the World of Islam. Islamic Encyclopedia Foundation.
