= Pahlavan panbeh =

- Meaning: A person who appears strong but is powerless in reality

Pahlavan panbeh (Persian: پهلوان پنبه) is an idiomatic expression in the Persian language that describes individuals or groups who appear powerful or brave but lack real ability or strength. The expression is commonly used in colloquial speech and in media texts to criticize exaggerated claims or superficial displays of power.

== Etymology ==
The term is a compound of Pahlavan (meaning champion or hero) and panbeh ("cotton"). Cotton in this context symbolizes weakness or hollowness, implying that the strength of the so-called hero is superficial and without substance.

== Usage ==
- In folk literature, it is used metaphorically for those who boast of courage or strength but prove incapable in action.
- In media and political discourse, the expression is applied to leaders or groups that make grand claims but show little effectiveness in practice.
- In everyday conversations, it often carries humorous or mocking undertones.

== In literature and satire ==
The idiom Pahlavan-panbeh appears in modern Persian poetry and Persian satire. For example, the satirist Iraj Mirza and poet Abbas Forat used it in their verses to criticize false claims of bravery and power. The expression was also common in satirical press during the Persian Constitutional Revolution, including the magazine Molla Nasreddin, where it was frequently employed to ridicule ineffective political figures.

== Equivalents ==
- In English, similar idioms include paper tiger or all bark and no bite.

== See also ==
- Proverb
- Zurkhaneh
- Metaphor
