= Hassan Ghassemieh =

Head of Iranian National Front

- حسن قاسمیه
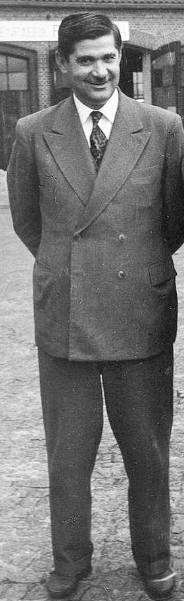
- Hassan Ghassemieh, Iran National Front Leader
- Born: 1292; Solan, Tehran
- Died: 18 June 1348 (aged 55–56); Tehran, Iran
- Occupations: Politician, Businessman

Hassan Ghassemieh, also known as Haj Hassan Ghassemieh (1292 in Solan, Tehran – 18 June 1348 in Tehran, Iran), was the head of the Iranian National Front, the organizer of the Tehran City Market Committee and the founder of Sara Hajj Hassan Nou was in [Tehran]. He was involved in trading in the fields of import and export business, and was advocated by Mohammad Mosaddegh. He has been arrested and imprisoned or exiled from Iran repeatedly.

== Biography ==
Hassan Ghasemieh Zadeh was born in 1292 in [Sarcheshmeh neighborhood] Tehran. His father, Haj Mohammad Ghassem Ghassemieh, was a well known merchant in Tehran and in the Sarcheshmeh area of [Tehran], from the holders of the [Constitutional] and during the Persian Constitutional Revolution at the embassy England Tehran were strangled. Haj Hassan Ghassemieh started his business after graduating from his father's trading company in [Tehran's market]. Haj Hassan started his business in the fields of import and export. Shortly after, he took over the management of the trading house and, along with the business of Haj Abbas Ghanai and Haj Mohammad Hossein Malikzadeh, started building the Haj Hassan Nou [Tehran Market] building. In 1327, the Haj Hassan-e-Nawa Complex, which consisted of 114 businesses and 56 warehouses, was completed and became available to interested merchants. Haj Hassan Ghassemieh founded a dairy product dairy factory called Punching Factory in Tehran, in 1338, with the participation of two businessmen Haj Abdullah Ansari and Abbas Ali Zarei Madani.

== Political activity ==
Hassan Ghassemieh started political activity since 1328 with the anti-colonial struggle of the Iranian people led by Mohammad Mosaddegh for the Nationalization of the Iranian oil industry. He was one of the most prominent supporters of Iran's national oil industry, which played an important role in the success of the movement. He was one of the organizers of the Tehran Market Committee and a member of the National Resistance Movement and was one of the leaders of the Iranian National Front. In July 1339, Allahyar Saleh tried to reopen the national front in Iran. As a result of the first congress of the Iranian National Front (Second National Front, in 1969, with the presence of 170 elected members of their constituencies from all over the country, opened with the message of Muhammad Mossadeq, and for seven days from 4 December at Hassan Ghassemieh's home Tehran Pars Meeting continued. Following the efforts of the Iranian National Front activists to hold protest rallies on February 6, 1961, in protest of the White House Shahr-e-Bazaar [Shahr-e-Bazaar] Shah's Plan and a large crowd of members of the Iranian National Front, including Hassan Ghassemieh Arrested by SAVAK officials. He was imprisoned for 8 months in [Qezel Castle Castle], whose term of his conviction passed with other leaders Iranian National Front.

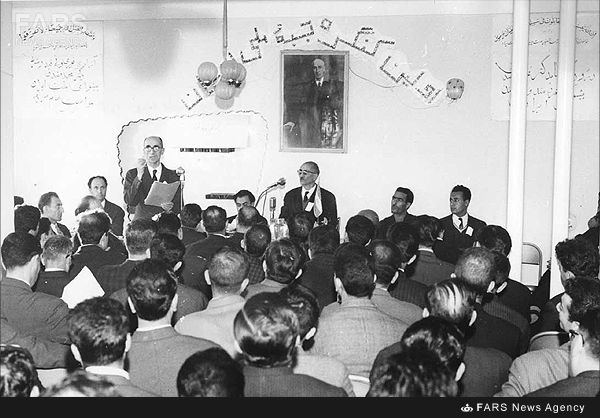
Inaugural Meeting of Front Line (Jepeh Mehli)

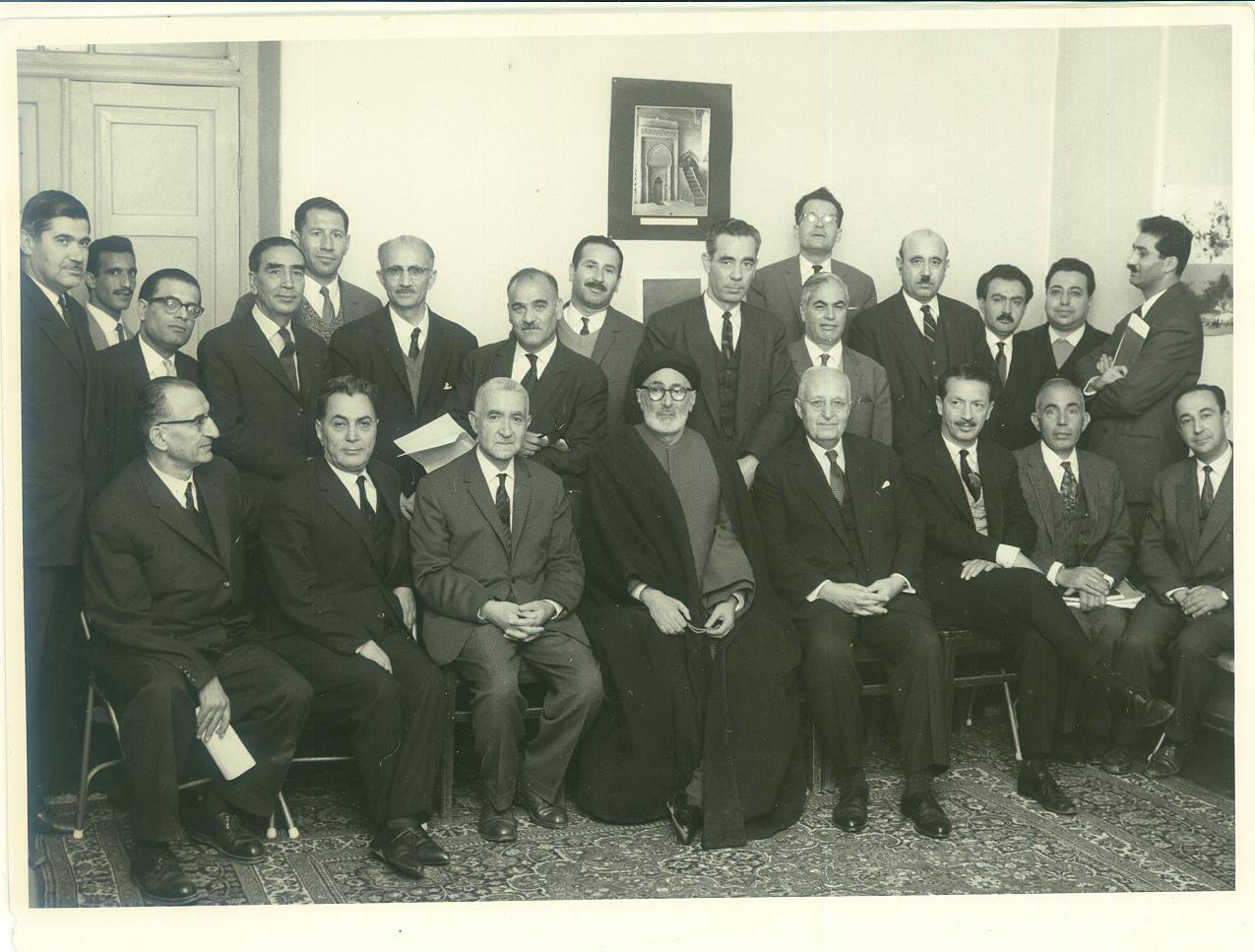
Image of Iranian National Front Leaders Hassan Ghassemieh, shown on the left of the photo

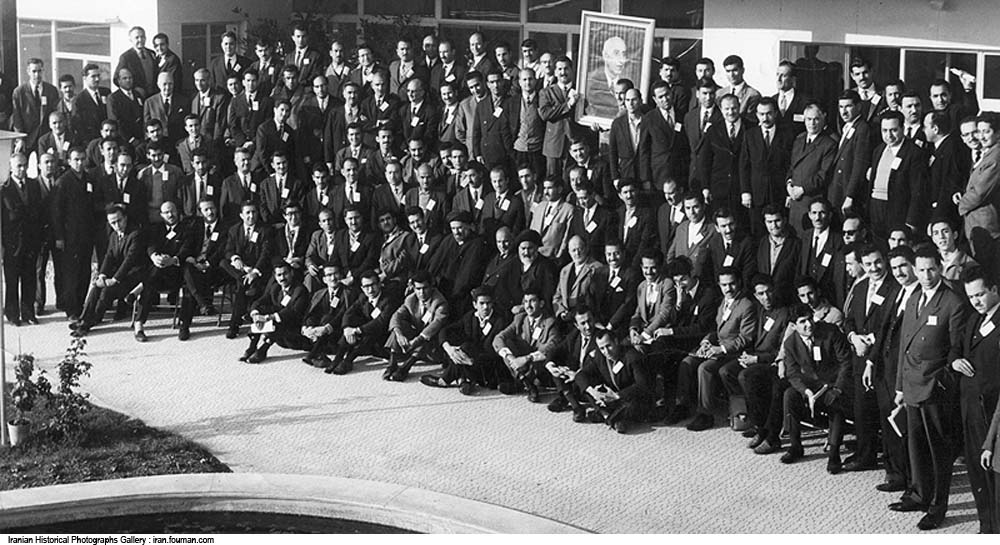
Tehran National Front Congress 1962

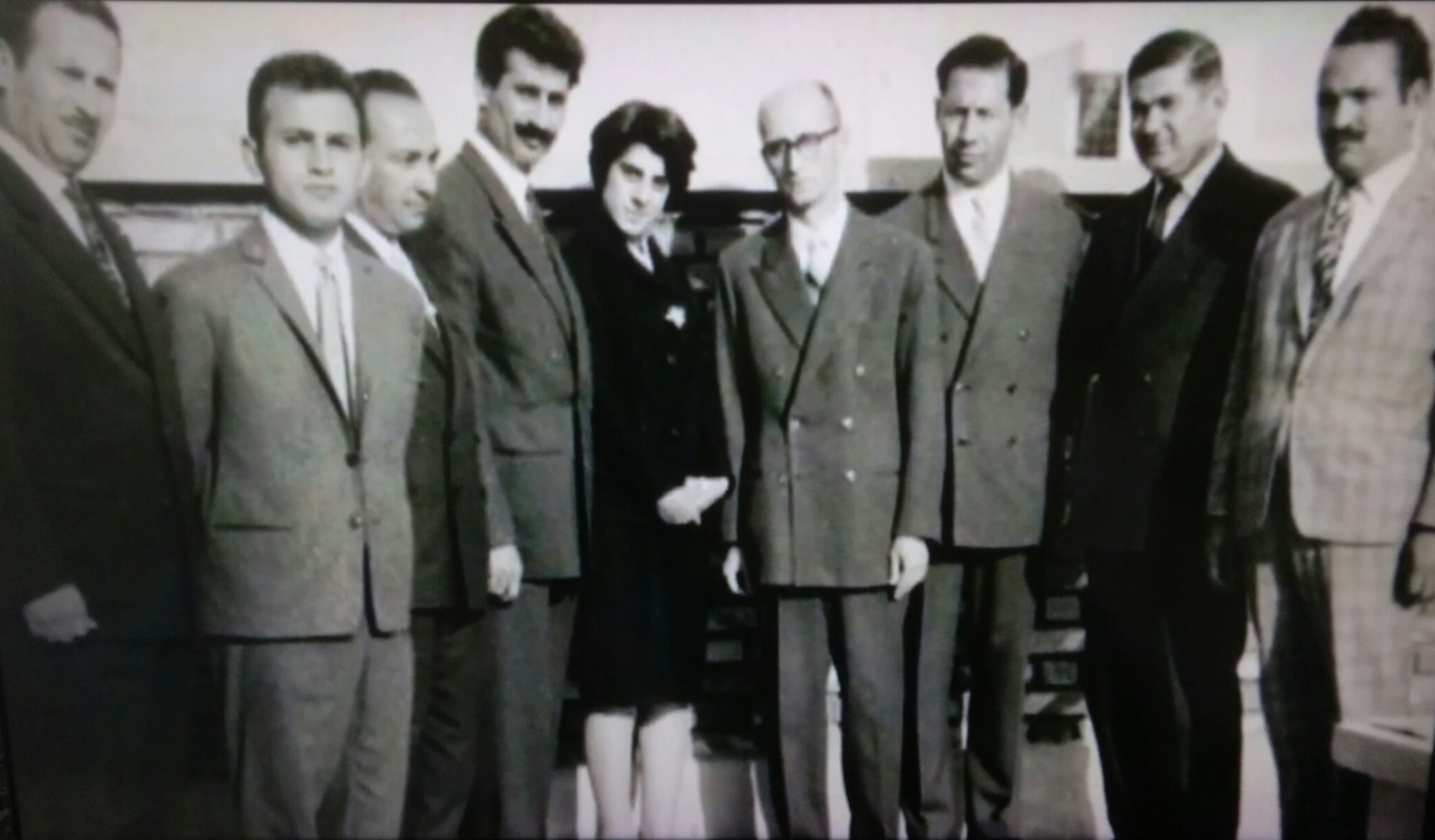
Hassan Ghassemieh with Fooroohar and Wife

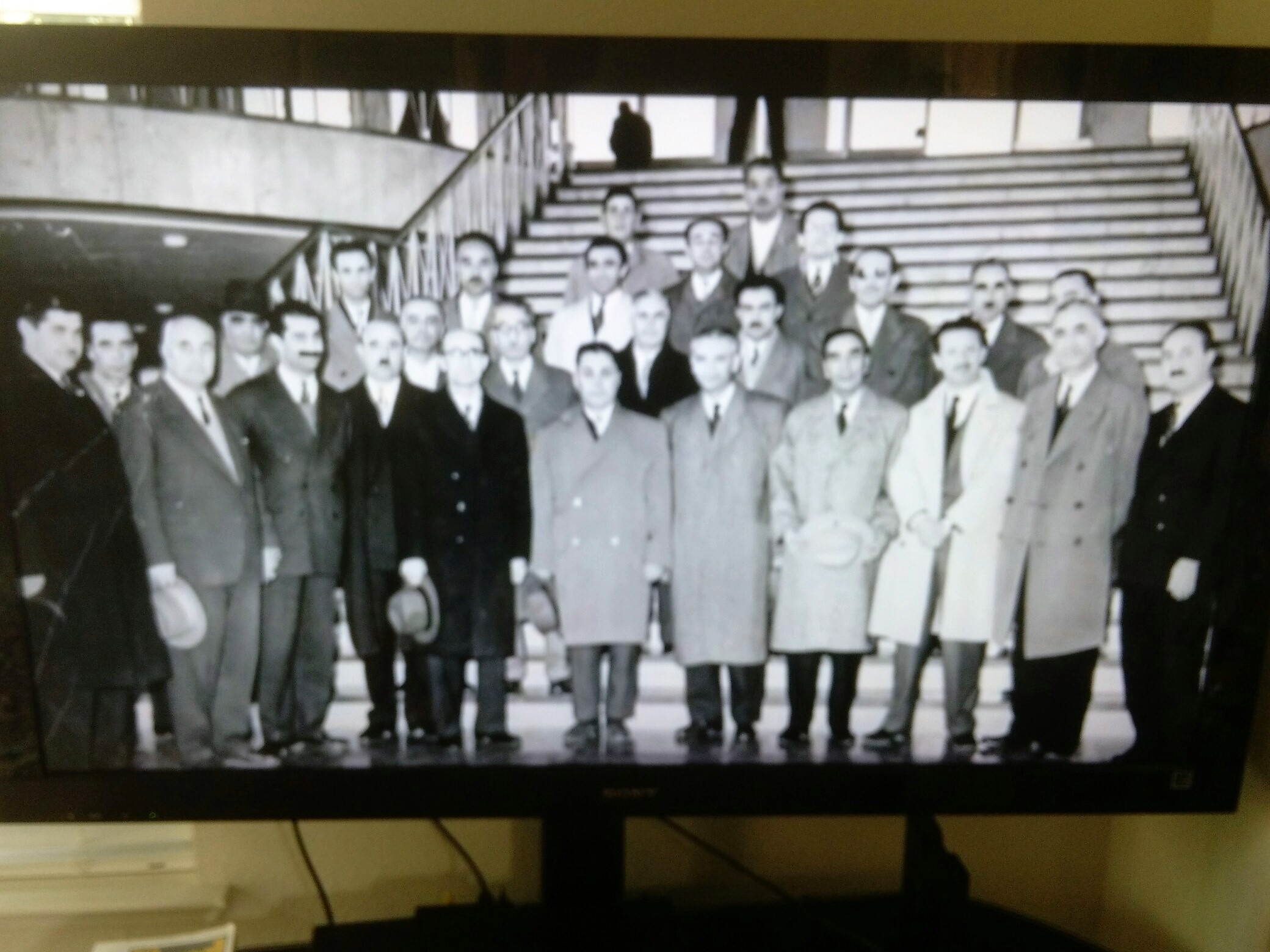
Airport send off Front Line members.

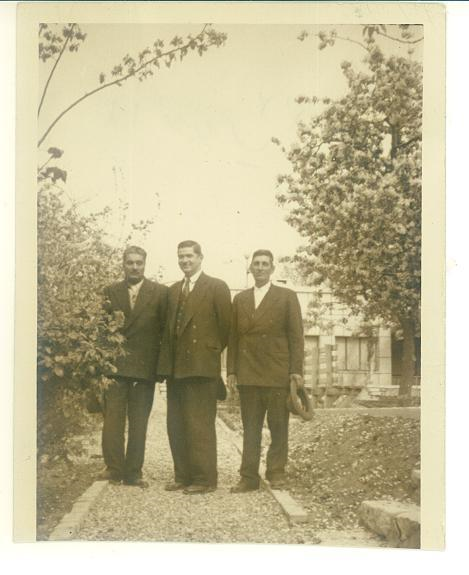
Hassan Ghassemieh standing with fellow National Front Member Mohammad Shamshiri

== After the coup d'état of August 28 ==
After the August 28th coup 1332 and the collapse of the government Mohammed Mossadegh and the arrest of loyal leaders of the Iranian National Front were stopped. Some activists from the front who are from Hassan Ghassemieh along with Seyyed Reza Zanjani and Mohammad Nakhshub People's Party of Iran Khrgami (Iran's envoy) [Eng.] Azimi [Party of Iran] Mehdi Bazargan Hussein Shah Hossaini Yadollah Sahabi Nasseradr al-Haftazi and Ahmad Tavagar and engineer in charge of the National Resistance Movement continued to fight the government. In the eighteenth election, [the National Resistance Movement] introduced 12 candidates and called on the people to vote for them. Hassan Ghassemieh was responsible for the referendum basin of [Ferdowsi] [Street], by providing numerous documents of Muratq's extensive offenses and fraud, announcing the crime to [the Supreme Court], and The House surrendered and also complained to the United Nations. He informed the foreign journalists of how the elections were held and paved the government's plan for legitimizing the parliamentary elections. After publishing a statement entitled "Let's awaken this plot", which was mentioned in April 1334 and the publication of the petroleum leaflet resulted in the arrest of the leaders of the National Resistance Movement, Hassan Ghassemieh Seyyed Reza Zanjani, and then the imprisoned Hassan Ghassemieh was exiled To Lebanon in the city Beirut.

== Cultural and social services and the construction of schools ==
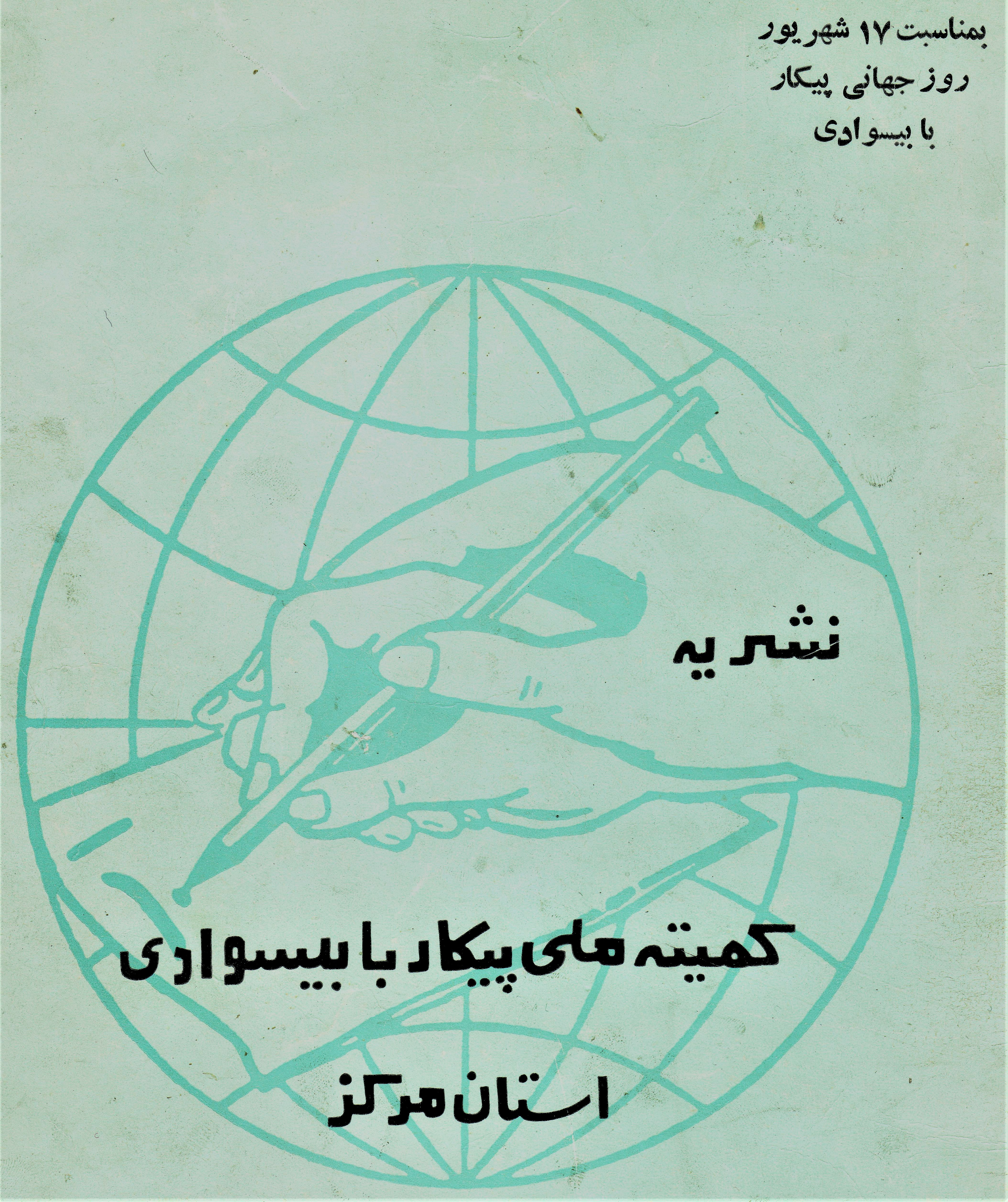

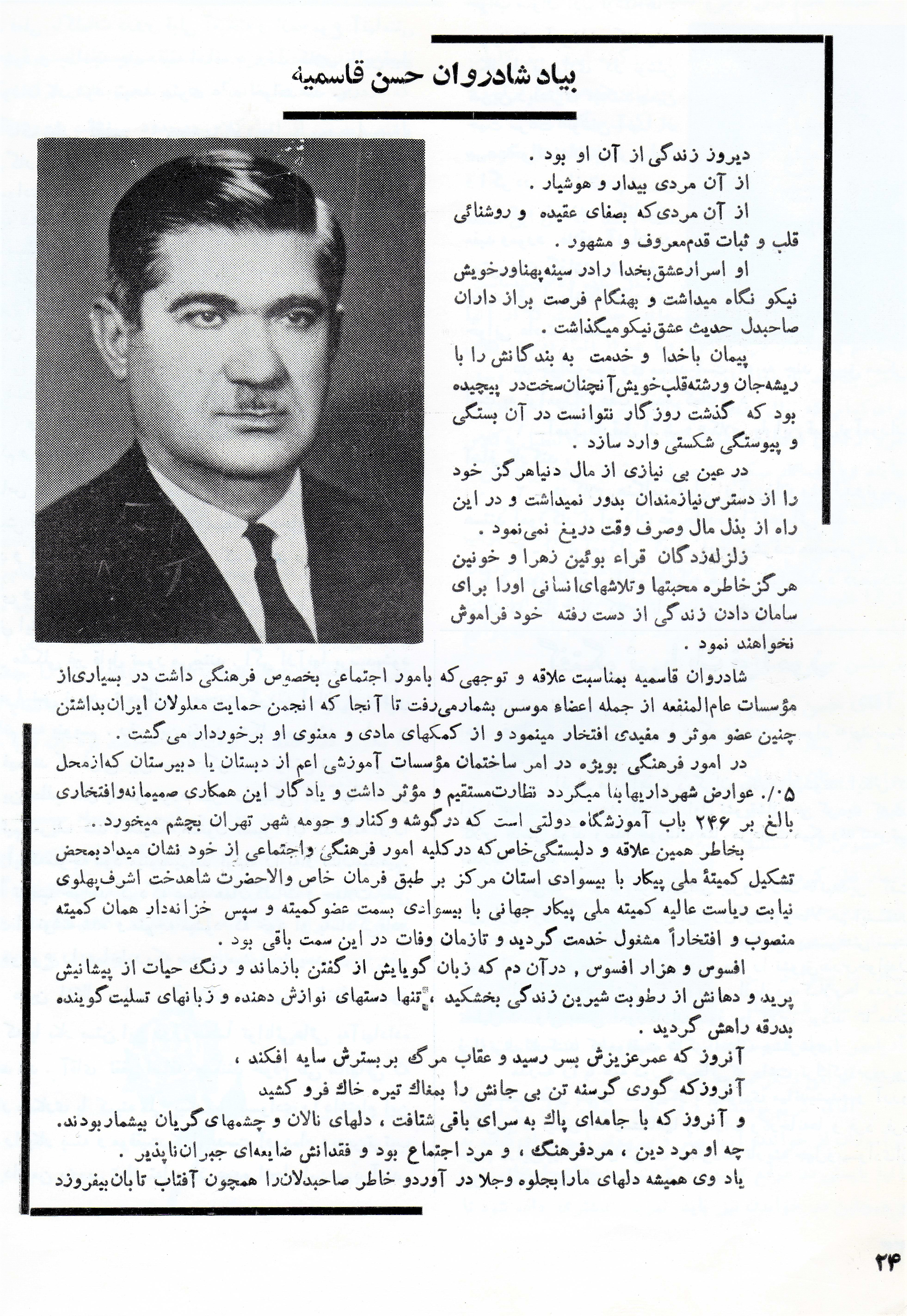

Hassan Ghassemieh was a supreme respect for the culture and culture, and he always tried to provide the education environment for the next generation. During the term of the prime minister, Dr. Mohammad Mossadegh Ghaloni, it was announced that 5% (five percent) of the municipal revenue would be available to the Ministry of Culture. The budget was intended to build girls 'and boys' schools. The Ministry of Culture sent a letter of invitation to this important program to carry out this important mission, including the invitation of a letter called Hasan Ghassemieh. Consequently, the board was formed and Mr. Hassan Ghassemieh was chosen as an honorary member of the treasury. This position would be very suitable for them in their quality and quantity for the rest of their lives. The Ministry of Culture has been honored at the Mehregan Celebration every year, and also thanks to the cultural services of Hassan Ghassemieh.

== Death ==
Hassan Ghassemieh had a short life but was all over his activities and patriotic and interested in work and friendship. He was a servant of the people. They wished everyone to have the best of culture and education and to live in peace and prosperity. Hassan Ghassemieh suddenly became ill and had difficulty diagnosing her illness and treatment. He was taken to treatment in Germany in Germany, and doctors who were trained there could not help. On his return to Tehran, in the sky Athens (Greek capital) died on the plane. His wife and son were with him. The following day, his funeral, along with a large crowd of relatives, friends and peoples of honor, came to Qom Qom Province Took him ڍڔ the tomb of Haj Mohammad Qasem Ghassemieh Tehrani, located in the garden of Rezvan Qom province. The ceremony was commemorated and ended in a mosque of Tehran organ with the participation of the Executive Board Iran's National Front and the culture educators of a very large crowd, commemorating its memories and social services. As a demonstration was held at Arg Square, before the end of the announcement ceremony was distributed and distributed among the marketers and the people. .

== Condolences and photos ==
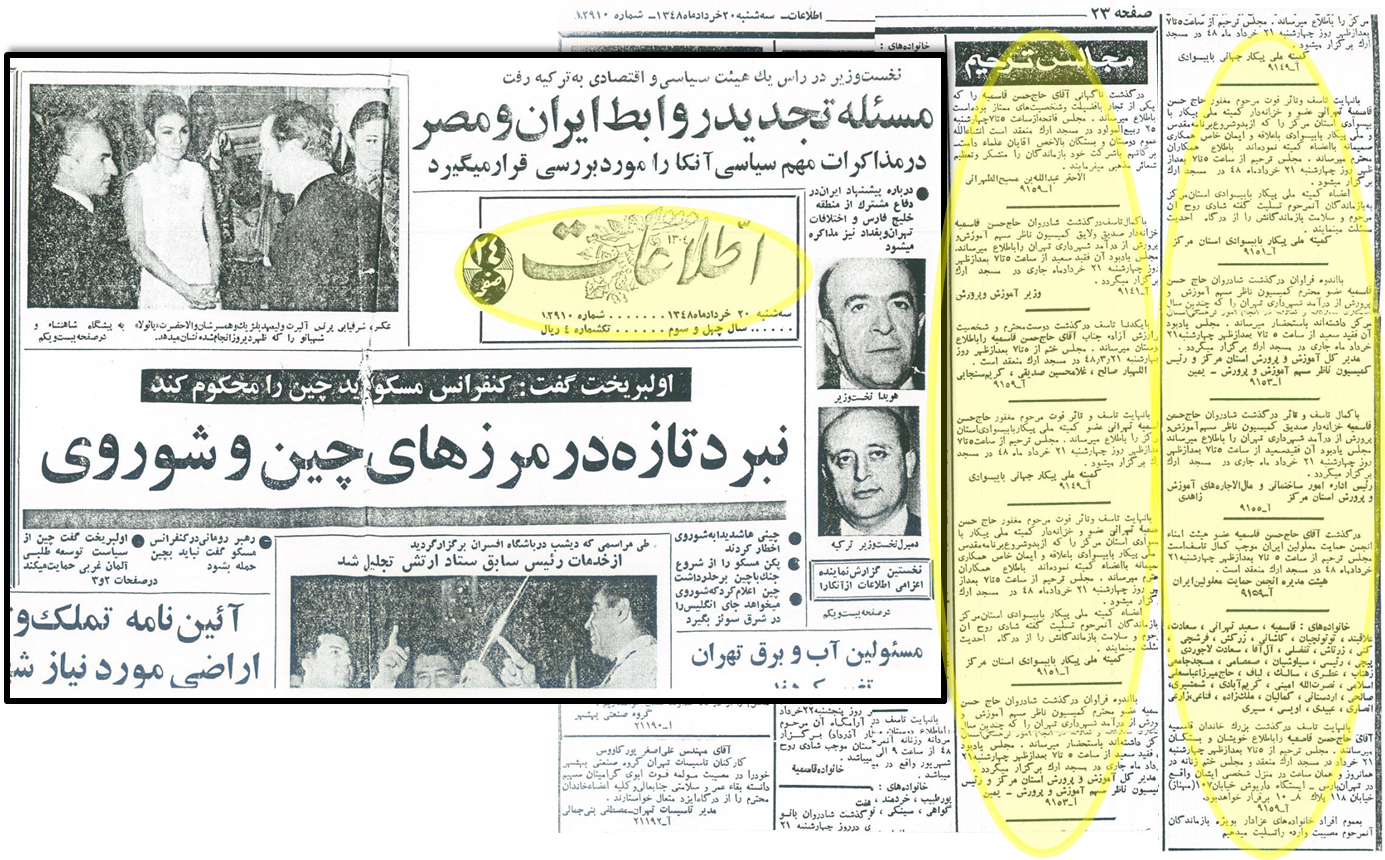

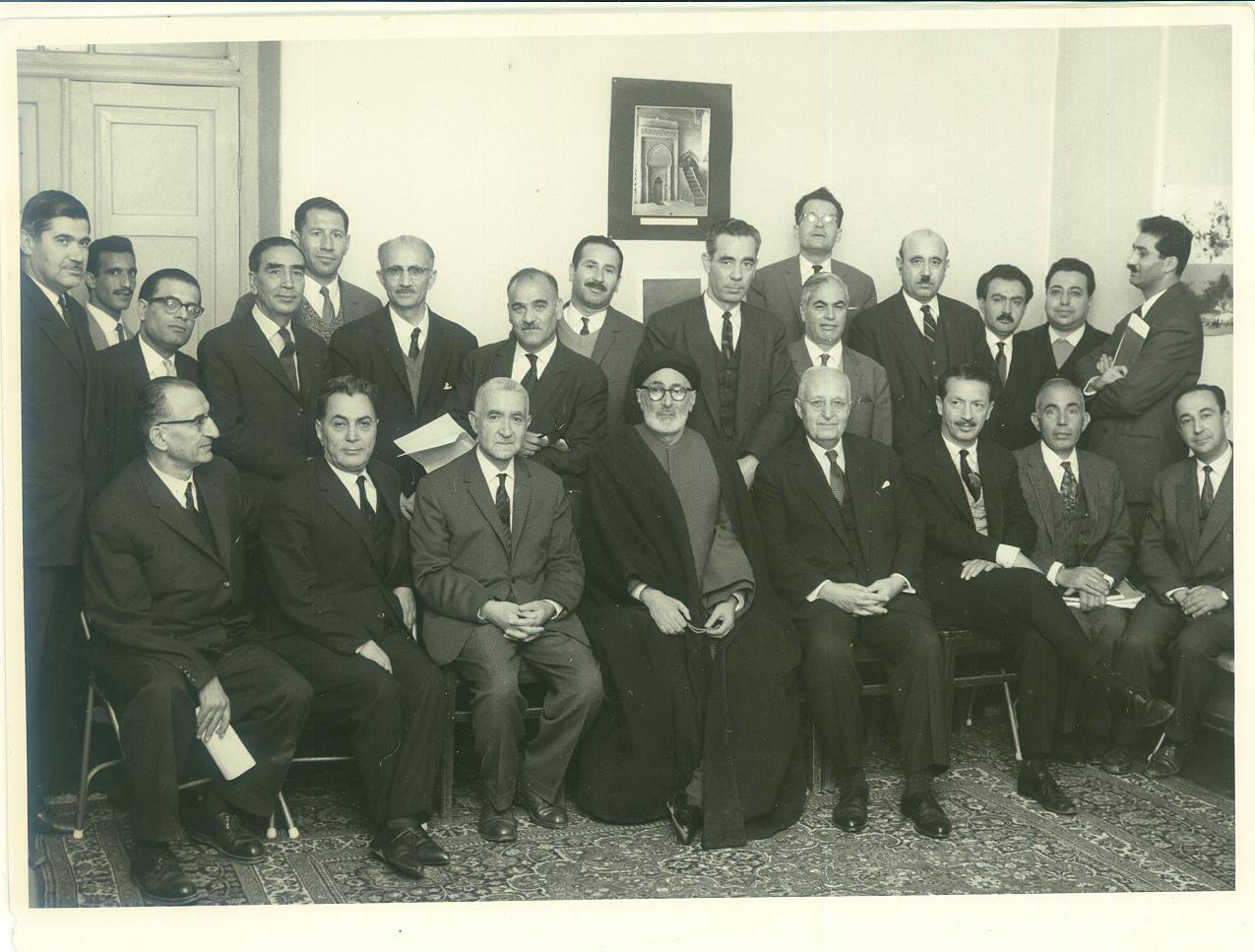
The image of the leaders of the Iranian National Front, Hasan Ghasemieh, shown in the left corner of the photo
