= Takhti Zurkhaneh =

Traditional gymnasium in Yazd Province, Iran

- (زورخانه تختی)
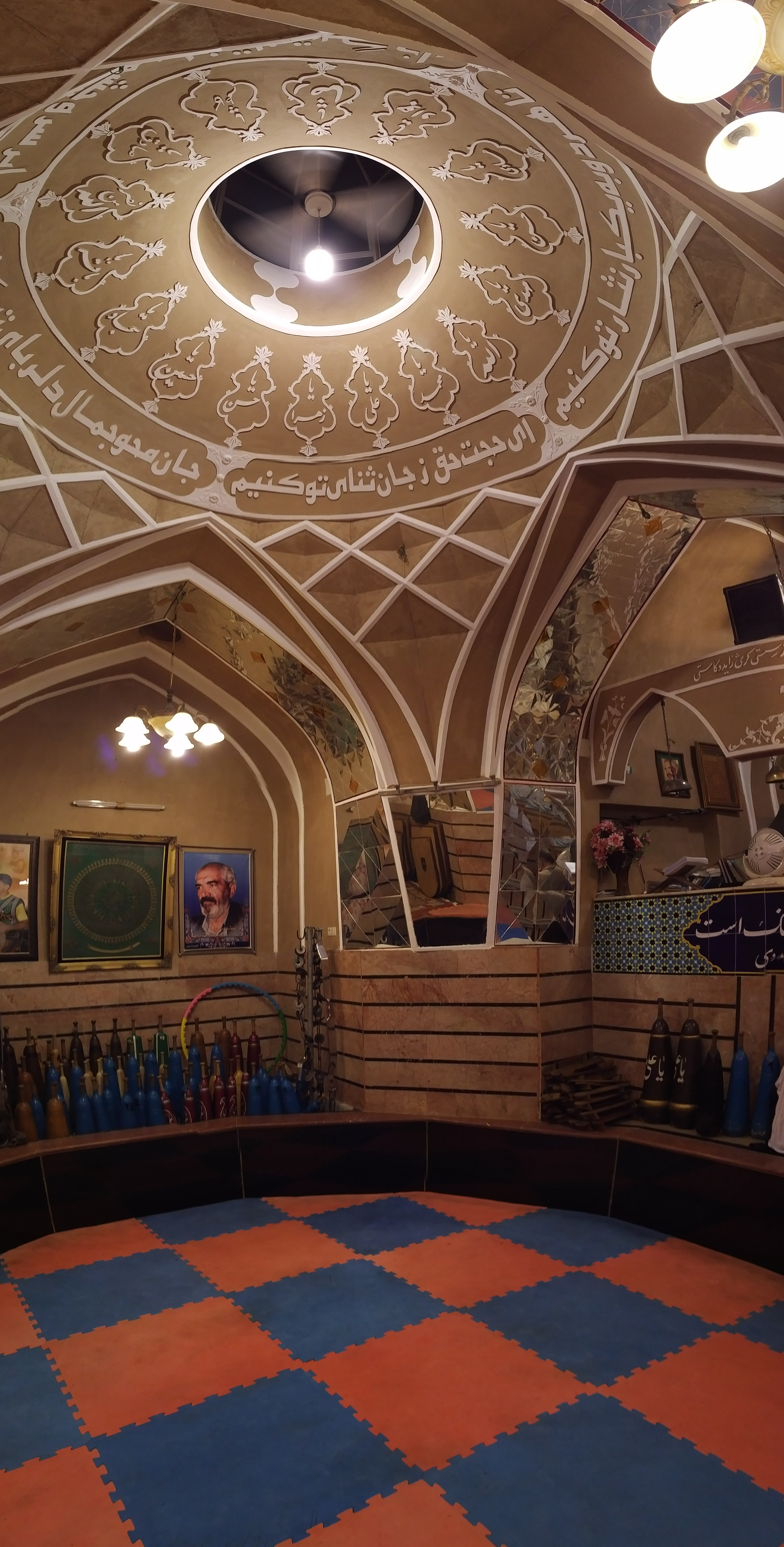
- Takhti Zurkhaneh Sports Club

General information
- Status: Active
- Type: Zurkhaneh (traditional Iranian gymnasium)
- Location: Yazd Province, Iran
- Completed: Qajar dynasty
- Renovated: 2010

Takhti Zurkhaneh (In Persian:زورخانه تختی) is a historic building dating back to the Qajar dynasty, located in Yazd, on Ghiam Street, Emamzadeh Alley, Ali Mohammad Shariat Bala Alley. It was listed among the Iran National Heritage List on 8 March 2009, with registration number 25366.

== See also ==
- Zurkhaneh
- Iran National Heritage List
- Pahlevanpour Zurkhaneh
- Cultural Heritage, Handicrafts and Tourism Organization of Iran
