= Pearl Cannon =

Historic cannon in Tehran, Iran

The Pearl Cannon (Persian: توپ مروارید, romanized: Toop-e Morvarid) is an old cannon in Tehran, Iran. It was involved in several cultural practices of the people of Tehran during the Qajar era. It is now located north of the National Garden, in front of the Ministry of Foreign Affairs building.

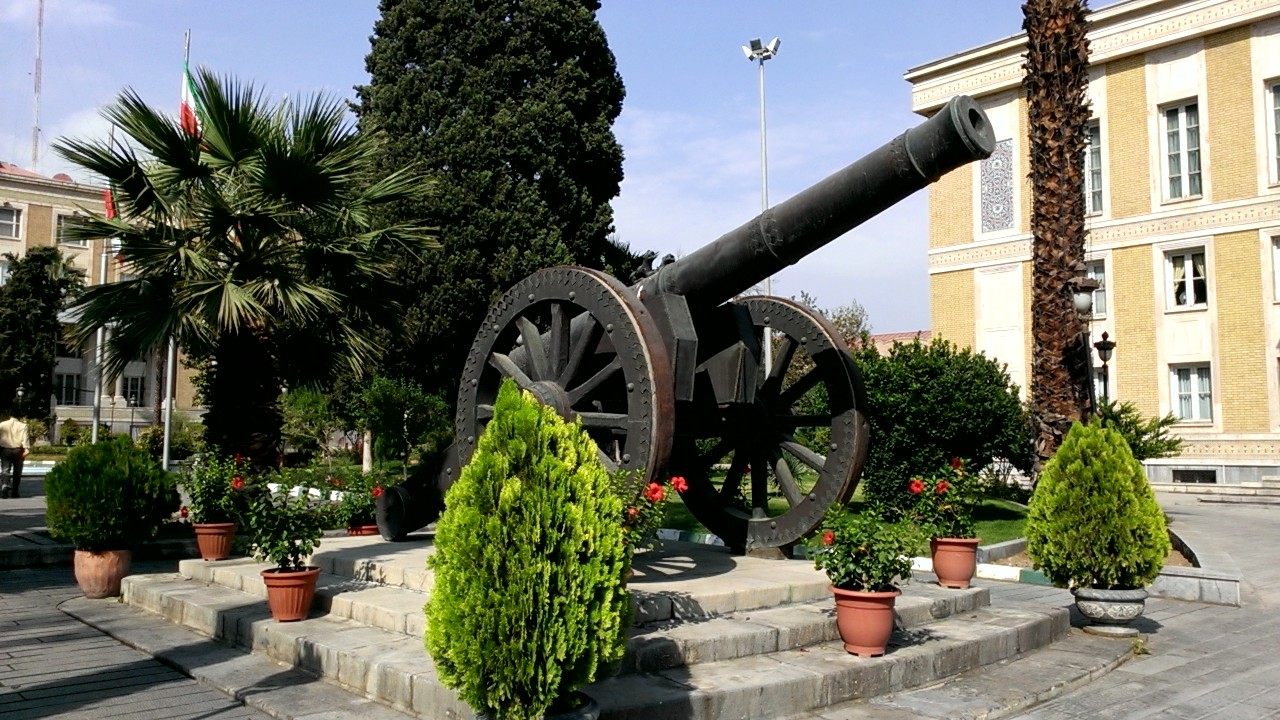
The Pearl Cannon in its current location.

The cannon was first placed in Arg Square, before being transferred to a place known as the Officers' Club. The Officers' Club was later used as an office for the Ministry of Foreign Affairs, and the cannon remains there today. The namesake of the cannon is unknown. Some, however, have suggested that it is named after several pearl necklaces decorating its muzzle.

== Oral culture ==
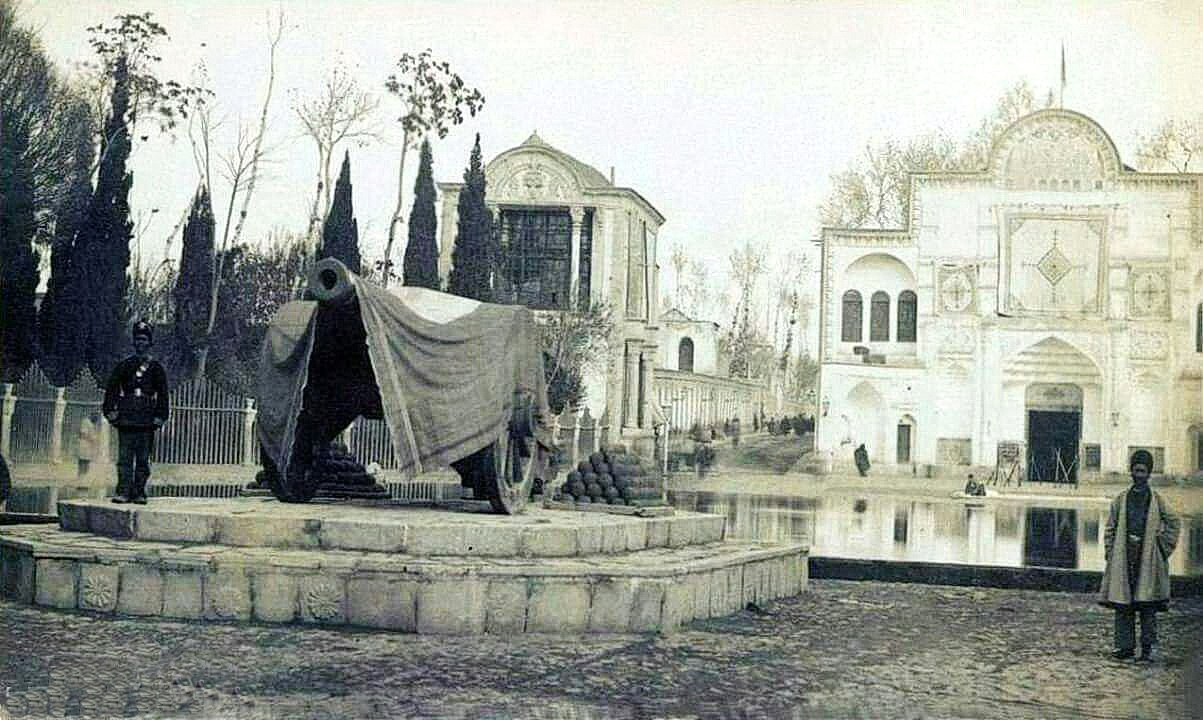
19th century photograph of the Pearl Cannon in Arg Square

Many stories are told about the origins of the Pearl Cannon. For instance, it is said that Abbas the Great took it from the Portuguese at Hormuz Island, or that it was built on the orders of Karim Khan Zand in Shiraz, or that it was taken from India by Nader Shah in his Indian campaign.

On the cannon itself, it is written that it was made by an Isfahani molder named Esmaiil Rikhtegar during the year 1233 of the lunar Hijri calendar (1817–1818 CE) on the orders of Fath-Ali Shah Qajar.

This cannon has been part of many superstitious practices by the people of Tehran. It was once common for women to tie a knot to it, believing that this would grant a wish, generally for a spouse or fertility and on Qadr Nights or on Chaharshanbe Suri. The people of Tehran would give gifts and bribes to the guards of the cannon, so they could be left alone in their rituals.

Criminals that were pursued by policemen used to take refuge under the cannon's shadow, and due to their beliefs, the policemen refused to arrest them, instead opting to wait until hunger drove them out from their position.

== Novel ==
Sadegh Hedayat, the author of The Blind Owl, wrote the book Pearl Cannon (Tup-e Morvari) in 1947, named after the cannon. In the book, Hedayat criticizes the superstitions of his time and the people's beliefs about the cannon, considering Iran's broader social and political context.

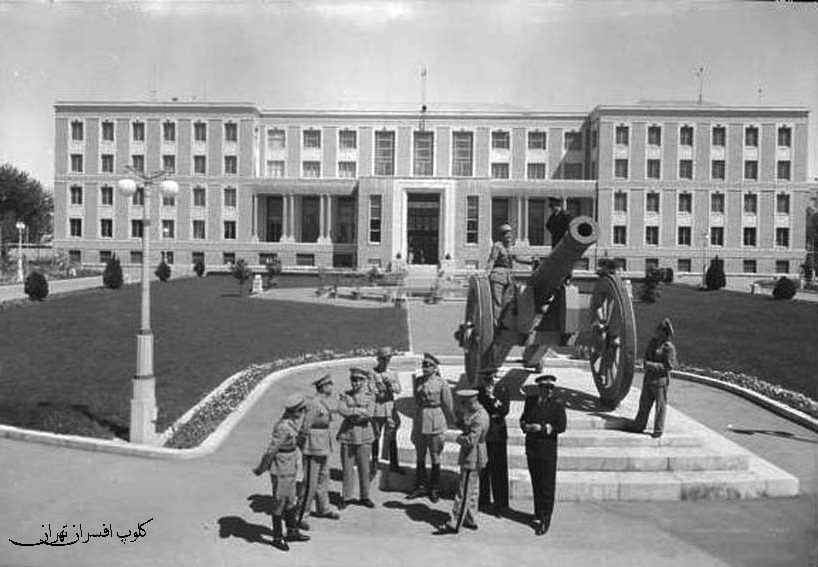
The cannon at Tehran Officers' Club, 1960s.
