= Hamzeh Ali Pahlevanpour =

Iranian traditional athlete

Pahlevan Hamzeh Pahlevanpour Hamzeh Ali Pahlevanpour
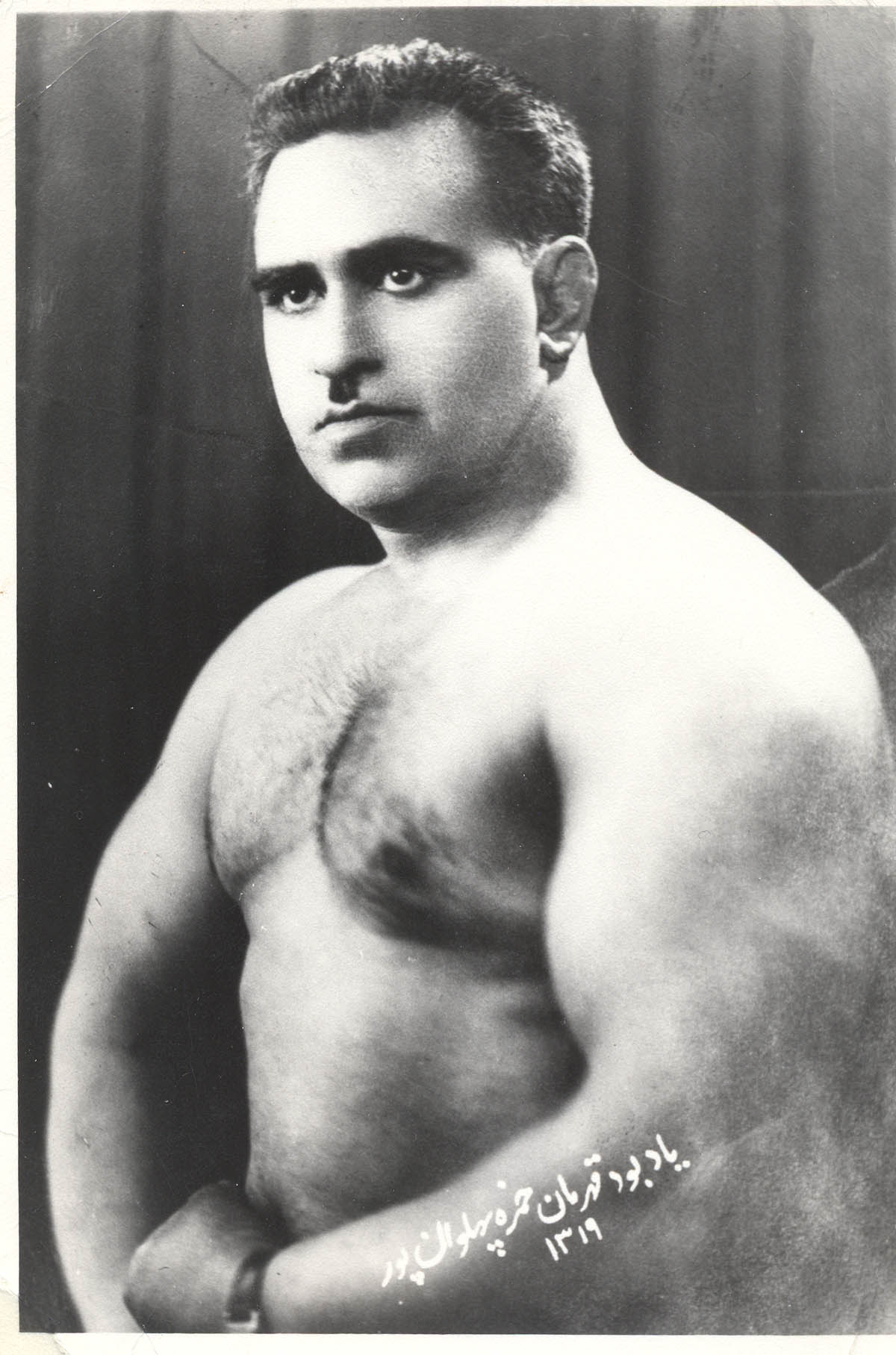
- Pahlevanpour in 1940
- Born: Tehran, Iran
- Died: Tehran, Iran
- Resting place: Behesht-e Zahra Cemetery
- Occupations: Traditional athlete (Pahlevani and Zoorkhaneh rituals)
- Years active: Pahlavi dynasty
- Spouse: Taji Mirzahahsini

Hamzeh Ali Pahlevanpour, also known as Pahlevan Hamzeh Pahlevanpour, (Persian: حمزه علی پهلوان‌پور) was a national athletics champion and the owner and manager of the Pahlevanpour Cultural Sports Club during the Pahlavi era in Iran.

== Biography ==
Pahlevanpour was one of Tehran's most renowned traditional athletes (Pahlevans) during the late Qajar and early Pahlavi eras. He obtained the traditional championship armband during the reign of Reza Shah. In 1925, he purchased the Zurkhaneh of Morshed Hossein Siah (which had been sold to a merchant named Asghar Bazarchi), renamed it after himself, and managed it as a cultural-sports club. Known popularly as "Pahlevan Shater Hamzeh", he held the title of Tehran’s and Iran’s strongest man during this era and met with both Reza Shah and Mohammad Reza Shah to discuss promoting traditional Persian sports.

He also owned several bakeries and shops near his Zurkhaneh, as well as the historic Saqa khaneh of "Kal Abbas Ali". Known for his charitable acts, he donated much of his income to support athletes and the needy. Because of such acts, he and a group of other generous champions earned the nickname "the open-door men". Notably, when his Zurkhaneh was damaged in a fire, he sold his house and several shops to finance its restoration.

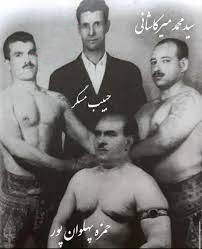
Mohammad Ali Savehei, Habib Mesgar, Morshed Mohammad Mirkashani (Eshghi), seated: Hamzeh Pahlevanpour with championship armband

After his death, the Zurkhaneh was sold by his heirs, and much of the building’s historic artwork and décor were removed by the new owner, leaving the site abandoned for years. Eventually, on 7 January 2010, as part of a revival project for Pahlevani and zoorkhaneh rituals, the Municipality of District 11 in Tehran restored the site, reopened it under Pahlevanpour's name, and showcased his photographs and those of other traditional champions.

== Gallery ==
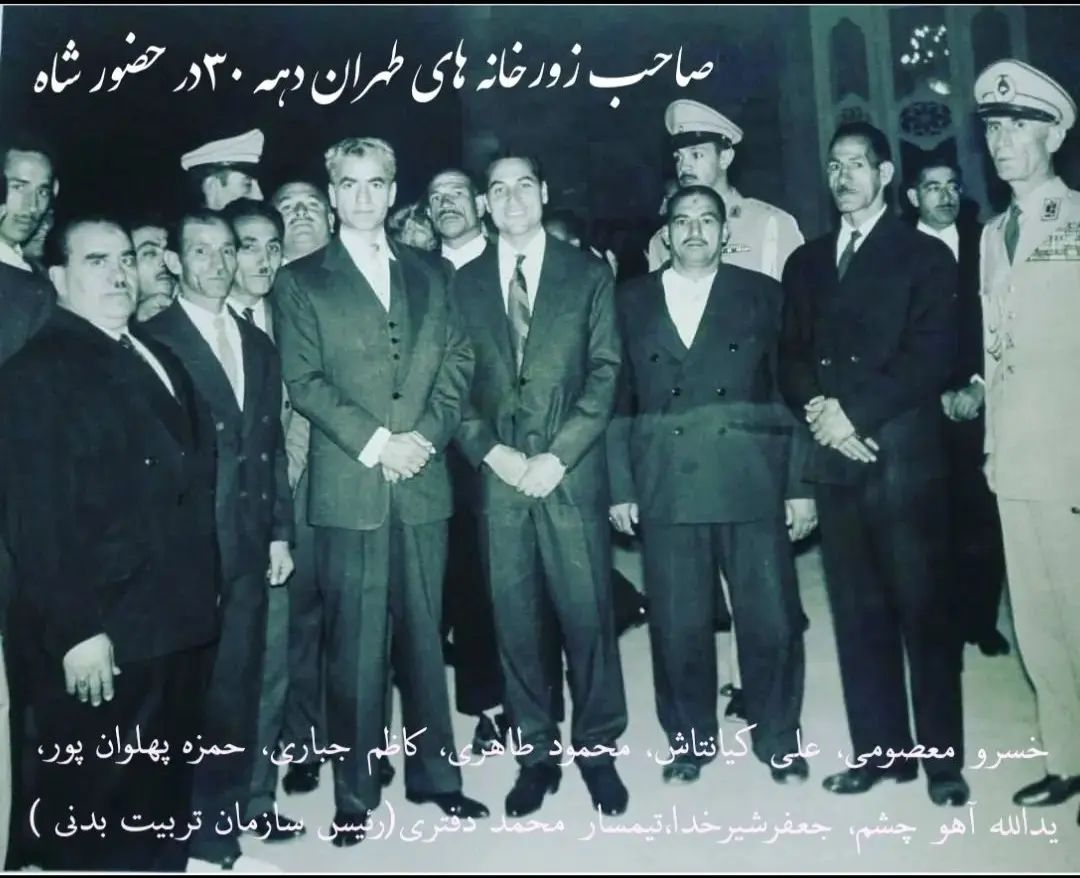
Meeting with Mohammad Reza Pahlavi, the last shah of Iran, and Tehran Zurkhaneh masters, 1951

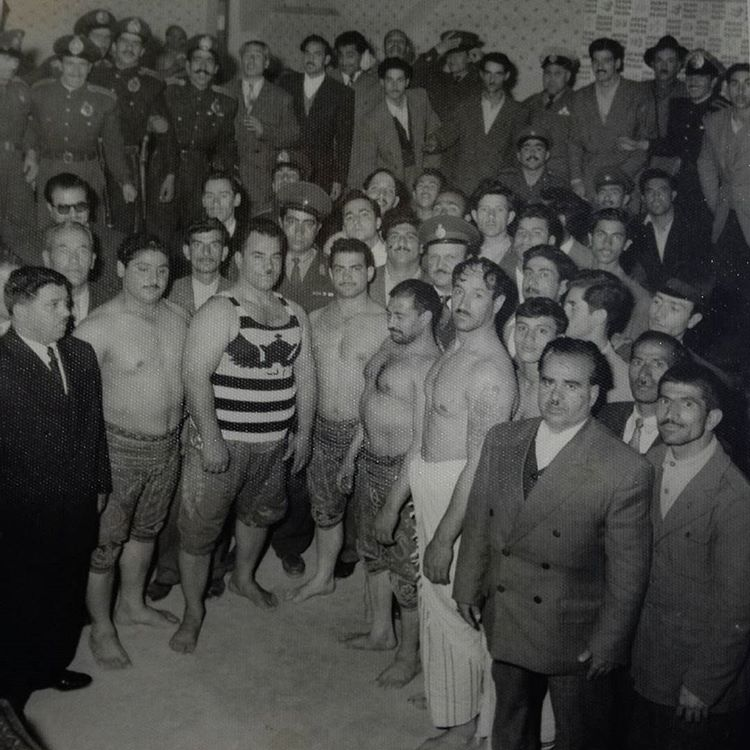
Sports celebration, second from right: Hamzeh Pahlevanpour

== See also ==
- Pahlevanpour Zurkhaneh
