= Pahlevani wrestling =

Traditional Iranian wrestling

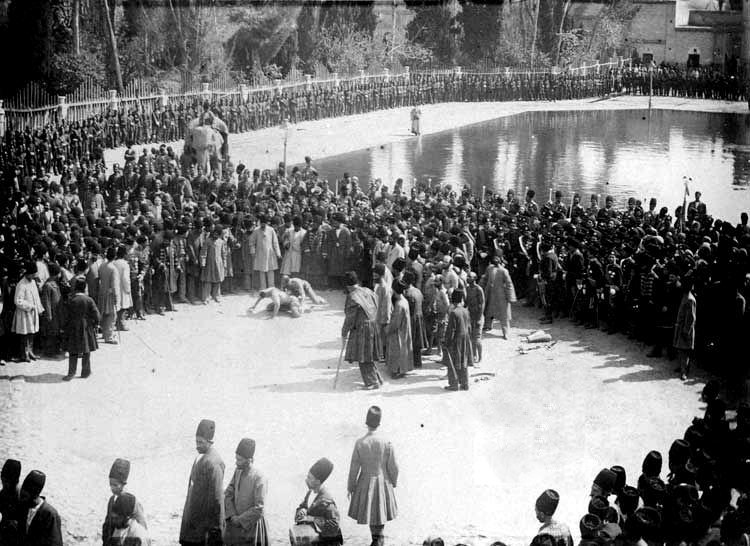
Traditional Pahlevani wrestling in Arg Square, Tehran during the Qajar era

Pahlevani wrestling (Persian: کشتی پهلوانی) is a traditional style of wrestling that traces its roots to ancient Iran. It was historically practiced by legendary Iranian pahlevans (champions) celebrated in Persian mythology. In Pahlevani wrestling, athletes wear special trousers covering the body from the waist to the knees, with an integrated belt-like section. The front waistband is called the pish ghabz (front grip), the back waistband the pas ghabz (rear grip), the front knee section pish kaseh, and the back knee section pas kaseh. Wrestlers may grip their opponent's trousers or belt to execute specialized techniques. Certain moves from freestyle wrestling and Greco-Roman wrestling provided the attacker does not bridge first are also permitted. The style is recognized by UNESCO as one of the world's ancient sports. In earlier times, wrestlers from India traveled to Iran to compete with renowned Iranian champions.
