= Saqakhaneh =

Traditional Iranian public drinking-water structure

Saqqakhaneh
- سقاخانه
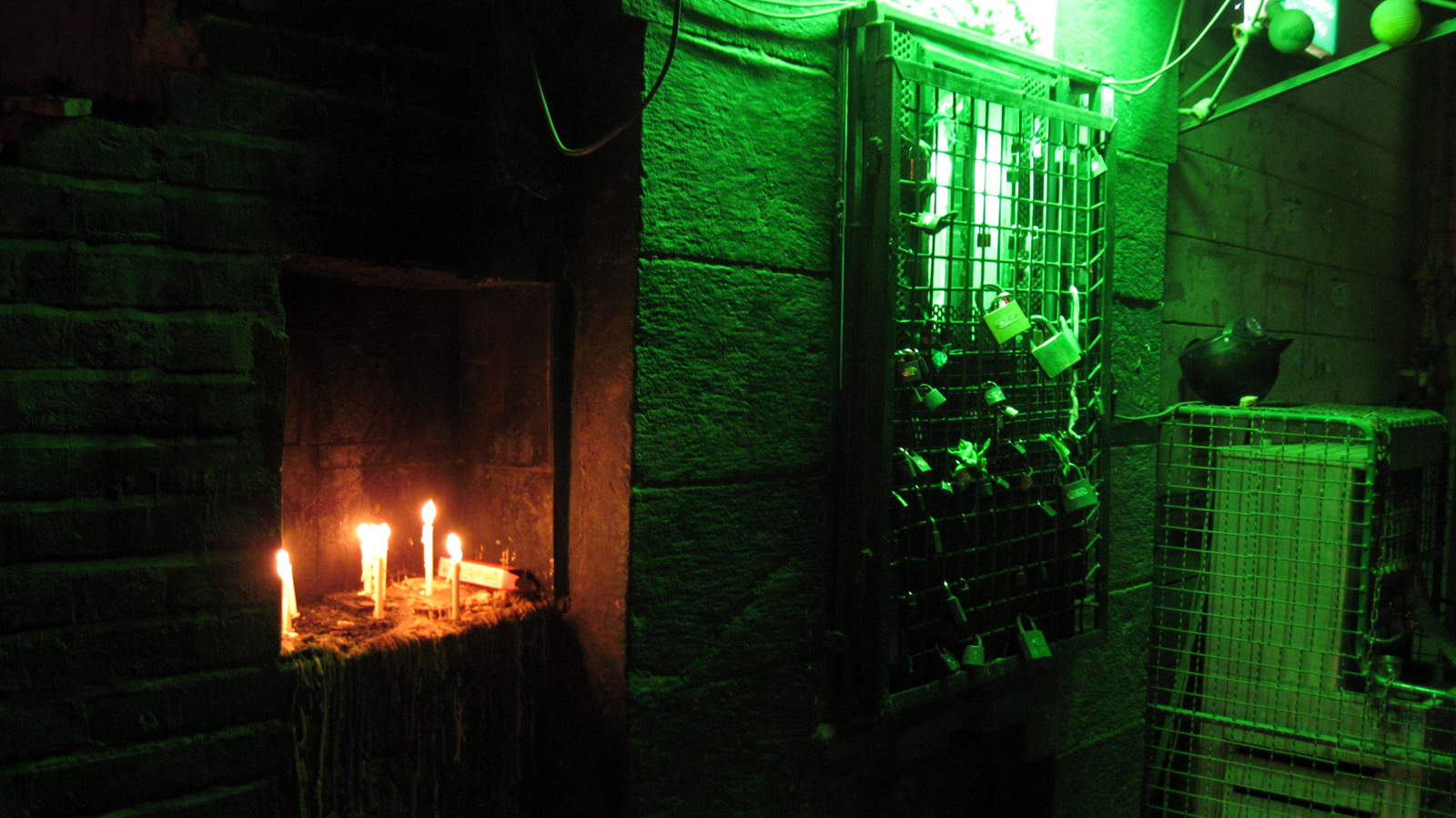
- A traditional Saqqakhaneh in Iran

General information
- Status: Cultural heritage
- Type: Public fountain / Religious structure
- Location: Iran

A saqakhaneh (Persian: سقاخانه) is a small public structure in traditional Iranian architecture, built to offer drinking water to passersby. Saqakhanehs were often funded by residents and merchants as acts of charity.

Typically consisting of large stone containers filled with clean water, they had metal or wooden cups attached via chains. While originally practical and philanthropic, Saqqakhanehs gradually took on a spiritual character. During Muharram, temporary Saqqakhanehs were erected, and candles were lit—especially on Thursday nights—as part of Nazr (vows).

In Tehran, some Saqqakhanehs were adorned with religious iconography, particularly depictions of Abbas ibn Ali and other figures associated with Ashura.

== Cultural significance ==
Over time, Saqqakhanehs became deeply embedded in Iranian-Islamic popular culture. They often housed religious posters, written prayers, charms, scrolls, and petitions. The most famous painted Saqqakhaneh in Tehran is the Khoda-Bandeh Lou Saqqakhaneh, dating back to the Qajar dynasty and considered a unique monument.

== Notable Saqqakhanehs ==
- Sheikh Safi al-Din Khaneghah and Shrine Ensemble, Ardabil – 16th century
- Saqqakhaneh of Kooche Dabbagh Khaneh, Yazd – 1517
- Azizollah Saqqakhaneh beside Jameh Mosque of Isfahan – built during Shah Suleiman I (1666–1694)
- Ismail Talaei Saqqakhaneh, built by Nader Shah (1736–1747) at the Imam Reza shrine

Of these, only the Ismail Talaei Saqqakhaneh remains intact.

Tehran has over 290 Saqqakhanehs. Among the most prominent:

- Saqqakhaneh of Karbala’i Abbas
- Saqqakhaneh of Nowruz Khan
- Saqqakhaneh of Sheikh Hadi Najmabadi
- Ayeneh Saqqakhaneh
- Khoda-Bandeh Lou Saqqakhaneh

One historic structure stands near Imamzadeh Seyyed Es'haq in the Khoda-Bandeh Lou alley. It is over 60 years old but currently in disrepair due to neglect.

== See also ==
- Nazr
