= Pahlevanpour Zurkhaneh =

Traditional Iranian gymnasium in Tehran

- زورخانه پهلوان‌پور

General information
- Status: Active
- Type: Zurkhaneh (traditional Iranian gymnasium)
- Location: 48 Shahid Asadi-Manesh St, Hasan Abad, Vahdat-e Eslami St, Tehran, Iran
- Completed: 1925
- Renovated: 2010
- Owner: Hamzeh Ali Pahlevanpour (founder)

Pahlevanpour Zurkhaneh (Persian: زورخانه پهلوان‌پور) is one of the oldest active Zurkhanehs (traditional gymnasiums) in Tehran, Iran, located in the Hasan Abad neighborhood.

== History ==
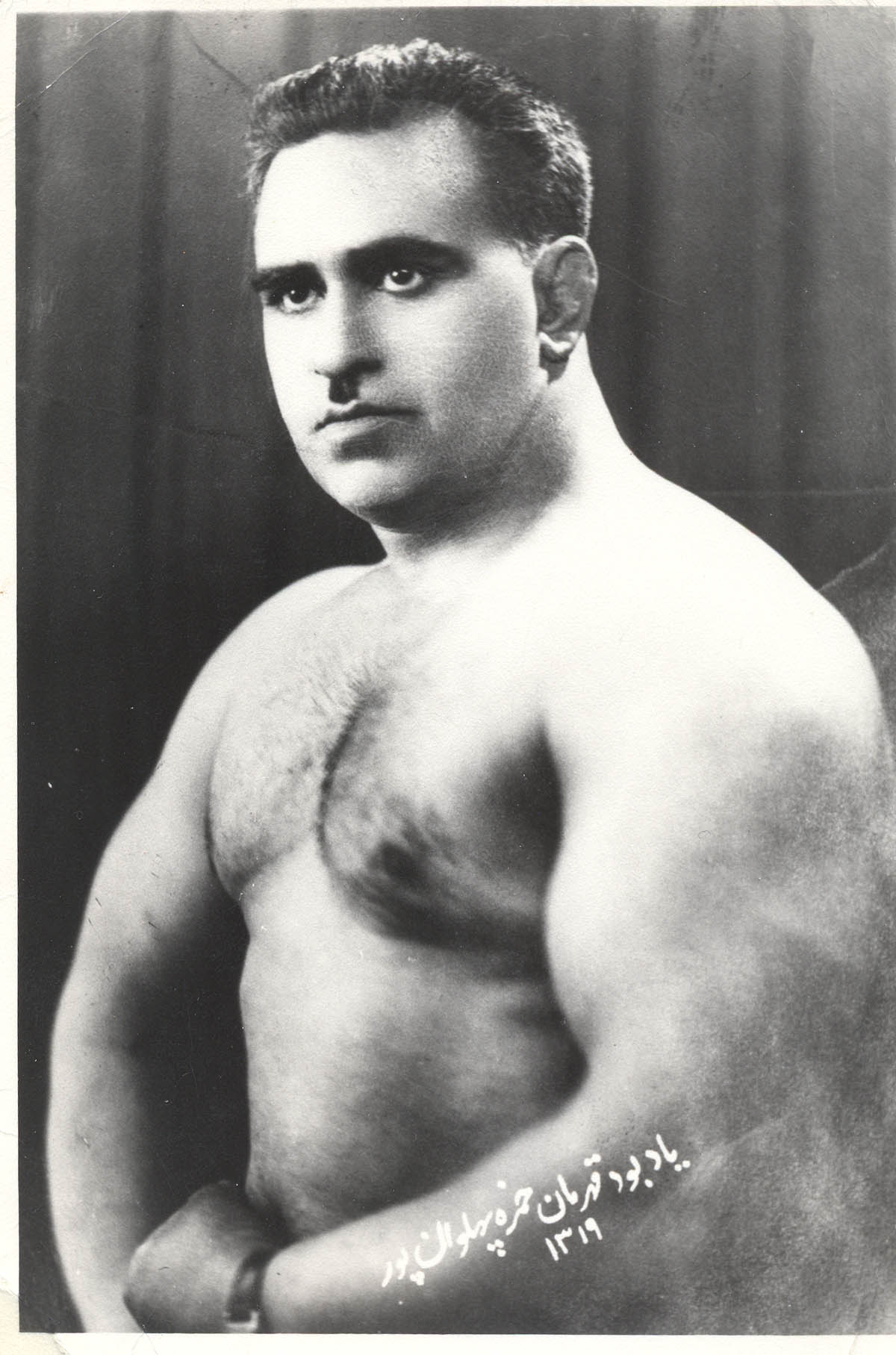
Hamzeh pahlevan pour 1940

According to the signboard above the entrance, the “Pahlevanpour Cultural and Sports Club (Bazaarcheh)” was founded in 1925 (1304 SH) by Hamzeh Ali Pahlevanpour.

Initially owned by Hossein Siah and later by Asghar Bazaarcheh, it was purchased by Pahlevanpour, also known as "Shatter Hamzeh", who renamed the gym after himself and added his name to the facade.

Pahlevanpour was a philanthropist, owning bakeries and shops near the gym and donating their income to athletes and the poor. He was among the “door-openers,” a nickname for generous men in Tehran.

After a fire damaged the building, Pahlevanpour sold his properties to fund its repair.

Following his death, the gym was abandoned for years. It was eventually restored and reopened by the Tehran Municipality’s District 11 on 6 January 2010.

== Notable Athletes ==
The Zurkhaneh hosted many greats, including Haj Mostafa Toosi, Kol Esmāl, Haj Ali Tak-Tak, Haj Baqer Mahdiyeh, and Javad Nokoubakht.

== Charity Events ==
After the 1962 Buin Zahra earthquake, the Zurkhaneh organized a major charity event and raised 300,000 tomans for victims.

On 13 July 2014 (22 Tir 1393 SH), a memorial Golrizan event was held in honor of deceased champions. Ali Naeimi, master and guide of the gym, rang the ceremonial bell in tribute.

== Community Meetings ==
On 12 May 2013, a gathering of Zurkhaneh coaches and masters was held at Pahlevanpour Zurkhaneh, attended by Masoud Ayenechi, Vice President of Tehran’s Pahlevani Sports Board. Monthly meetings were agreed upon.
