= Arg Square =

Historic square in Tehran, Iran

Arg Square, Tehran
- Shah Square (during the Qajar era)
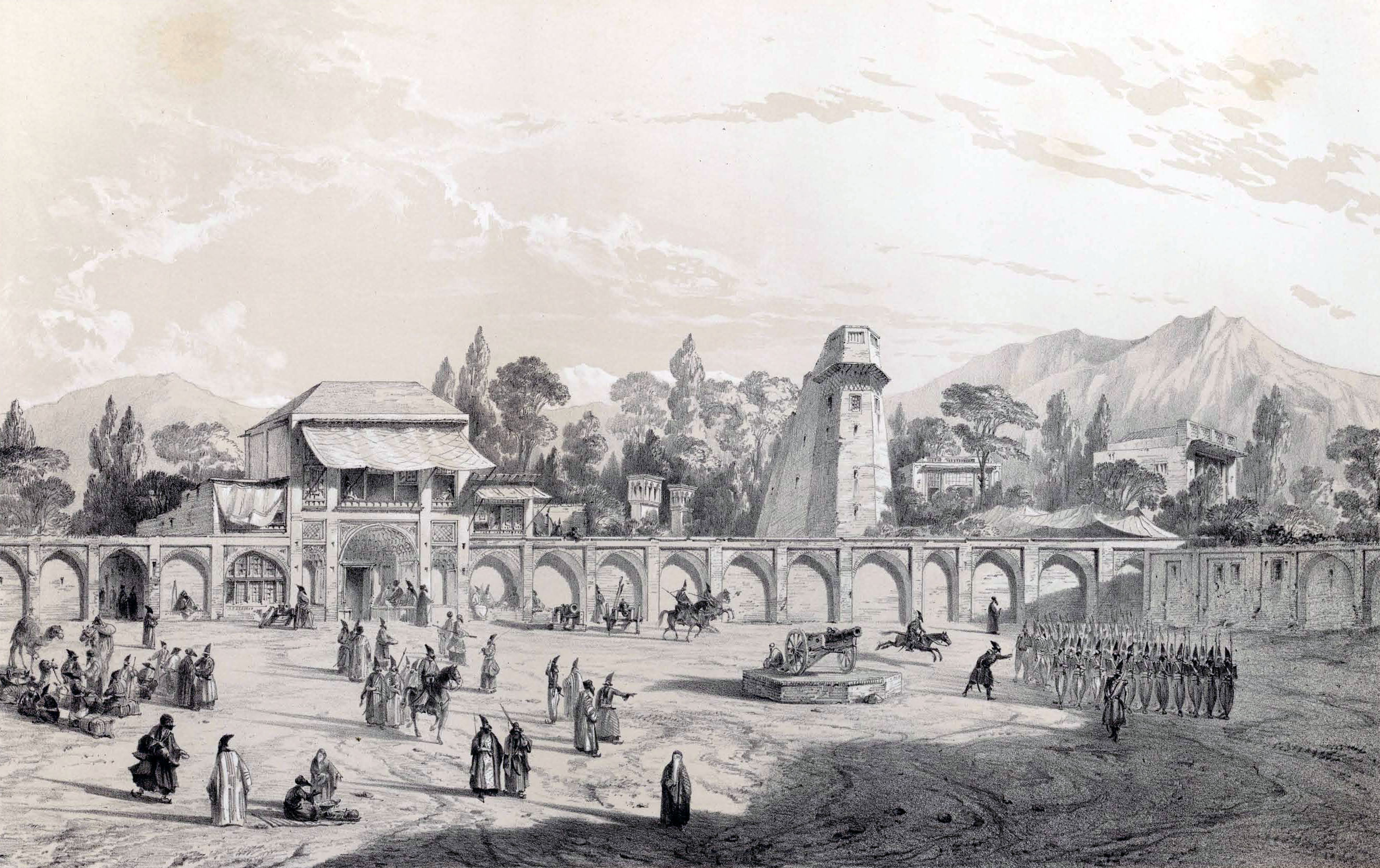
- View of the Royal Arg Square by Eugène Flandin, 1840
- Interactive map of Arg Square, Tehran
- 35.679067°N 51.418917°E
- Type: Square
- Location: Tehran, Tehran Province, Iran

History
- Built: Qajar era

Arg Square (Persian: میدان ارگ تهران, officially 15 Khordad sq.) is a historical square located in the central Tehran. Once situated at the southwestern corner of Arg of Tehran, it was the most important and largest open space of Old Tehran.

== History ==
The history of the Arg of Tehran goes back to the Safavid era. The Arg itself was surrounded by its own walls and a moat separating it from the city. Between the moat and the entrance to the Arg, a square was formed. This space was known by several names: Shah Square, Old Toopkhaneh (because of the presence of various cannons, including the famous Pearl Cannon), Golshan Garden, Arg Square, and Takht-e Pol (because a wooden bridge was built across the moat to access it). During the reign of Naser al-Din Shah Qajar, the cannons were removed from this square and transferred to the newly built Toopkhaneh Square. The only surviving remnant of the old Toopkhaneh Square is the Pearl Cannon.

This square was the first and oldest square of the capital city.

In the Qajar era, Arg Square was much larger than it is today. After the construction projects of the early modernization of Tehran, its area was reduced and replaced by buildings such as the National Bank (Bāzār branch), the Palace of Justice, and the Tehran Radio Station. The square, which had existed since the Zand era, was named Arg during the reign of Fath-Ali Shah Qajar. Later, it became known as Shah Square, Old Toopkhaneh, and Golshan Garden. Today, only a small part of the once vast Arg Square remains, known as 15 Khordad Square.

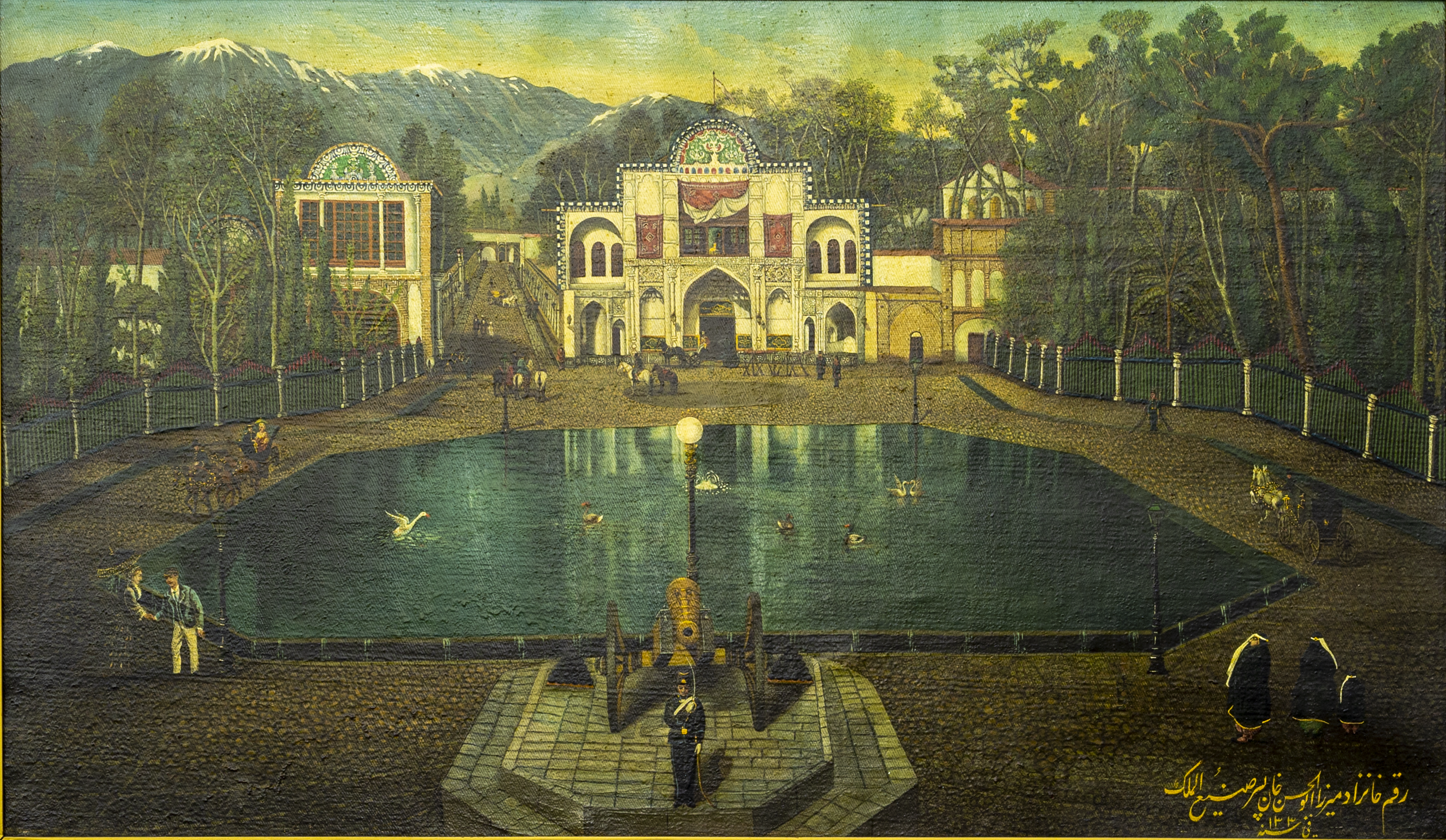
Arg Square by Yahya Ghaffari, 1885/86

Edward Granville Browne who visited Tehran in 1888, described the space as follows: "Arg Square is a beautiful square, well paved, with trees planted all around. In the center there is a large octagonal pool of water, around which gas lamps are installed. At the southern end of the square, a platform has been built upon which stands a large wheeled cannon, the famous Pearl Cannon, an exceptional and remarkable piece. Like the royal stables and various other places, it was considered a place of bast (sanctuary for offenders)."

== Gallery ==
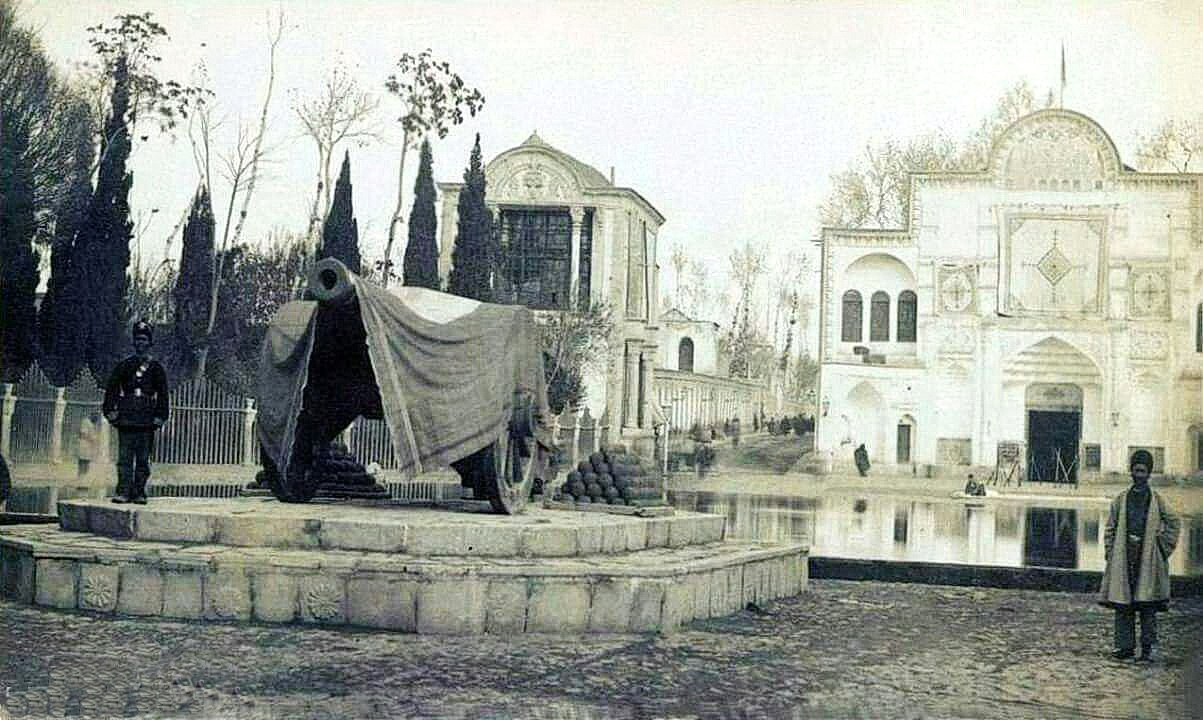
Pearl Cannon in Arg Square

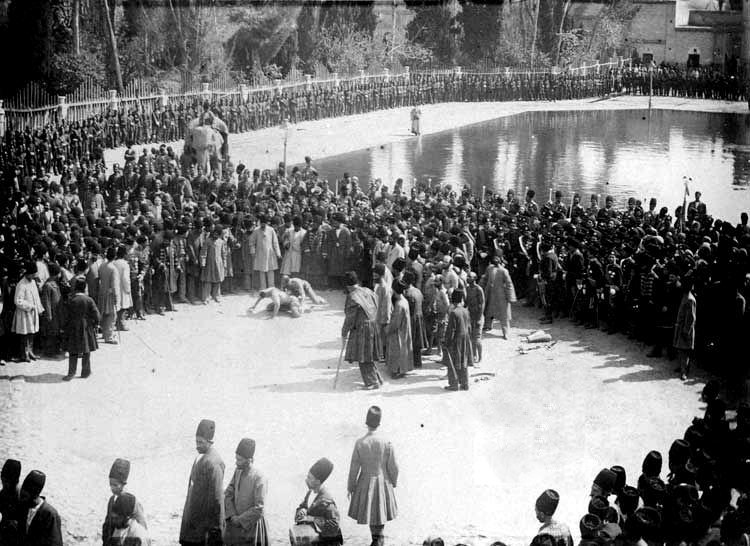
Pahlevani wrestling performance in Arg Square during the Qajar era

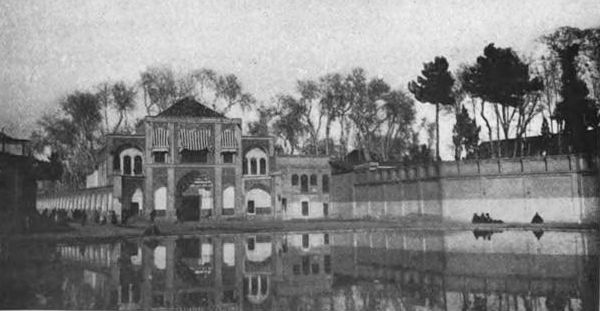
Arg Square, 1910

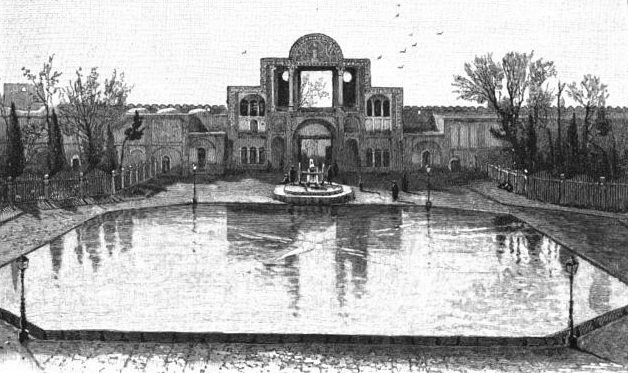
The Arg Gate, 1885

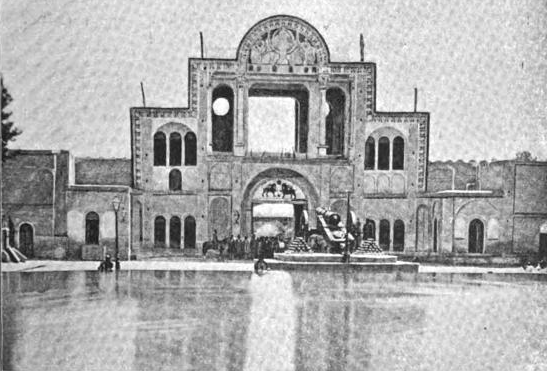
The Arg Gate, 1892
