= Malt =

Germinated cereal grains that have been dried

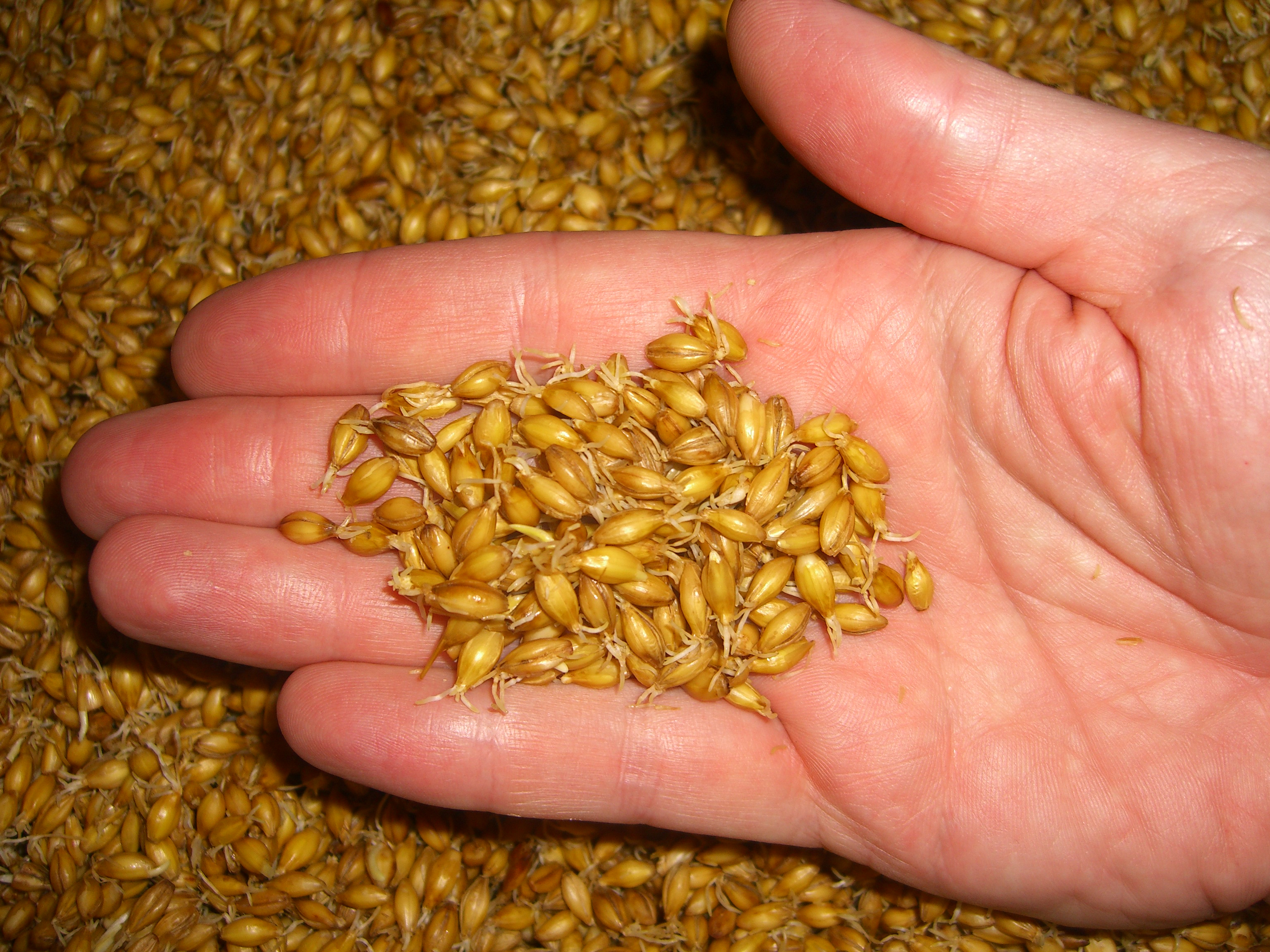
A handful of malted barley, the white sprouts visible

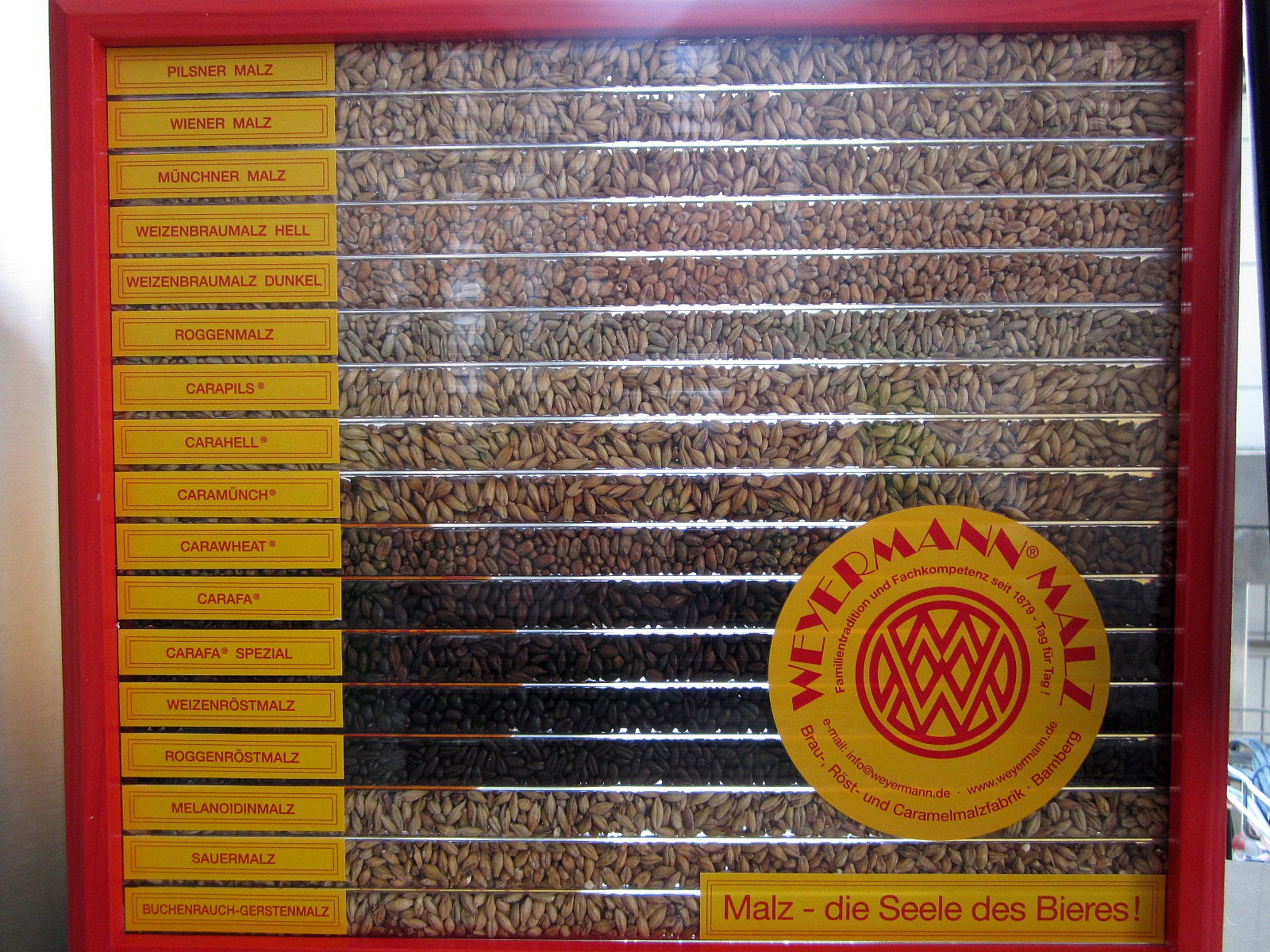
Beer malt varieties from Bamberg, Germany

Malt is any cereal grain that has been made to germinate by soaking in water and then stopped from germinating further by drying with hot air, a process known as "malting". Malted grain is used to make beer, whisky, malted milk, malt vinegar, malt syrup, confections (such as Maltesers and Whoppers), flavored drinks (such as Horlicks, Ovaltine, and Milo), and some baked goods (such as malt loaf, bagels, and Rich Tea biscuits). Malted grain that has been ground into a coarse meal is known as "sweet meal".

Malting grain develops the enzymes (α-amylase, β-amylase) required for modifying the grains' starches into various types of sugar, including monosaccharide glucose, disaccharide maltose, trisaccharide maltotriose, and higher sugars called maltodextrines. It also develops other enzymes, such as proteases, that break down the proteins in the grain into forms that can be used by yeast. The point at which the malting process is stopped affects the starch-to-enzyme ratio, and partly converted starch becomes fermentable sugars.

Malt also contains small amounts of other sugars, such as sucrose and fructose, which are not products of starch modification but are already in the grain. Further conversion to fermentable sugars is achieved during the mashing process.

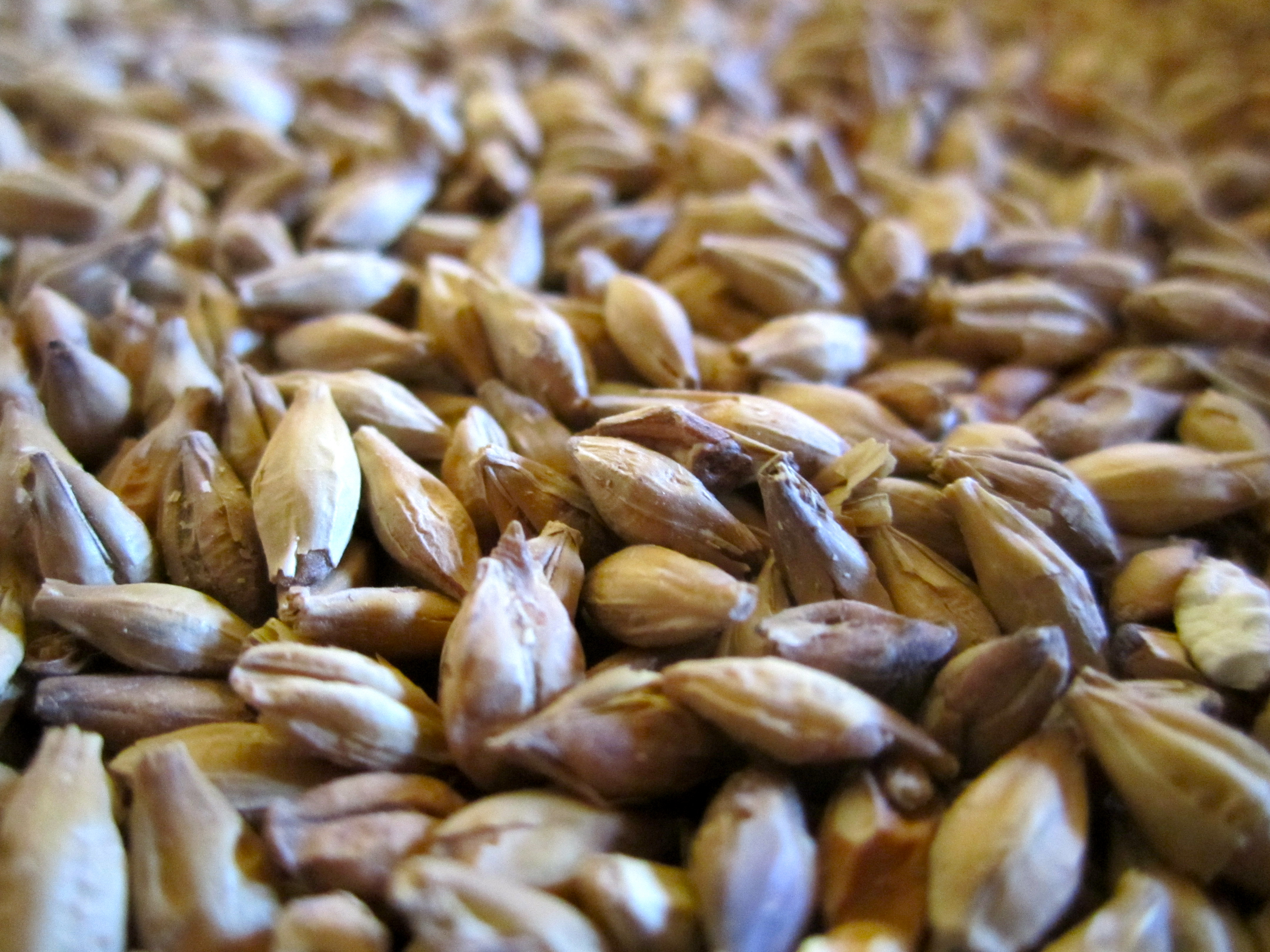
Malted barley

Various cereals are malted, though barley is the most common. A high-protein form of malted barley is often a label-listed ingredient in blended flours typically used in the manufacture of yeast bread and other baked goods. The term "malt" refers to several products of the process: the grains to which this process has been applied, for example, malted barley; the sugar, heavy in maltose, derived from such grains, such as the baker's malt used in various breakfast cereals; single malt whisky, often called simply "single malt"; or a product based on malted milk, similar to a malted milkshake (or "malt").

== History and traditional usage ==
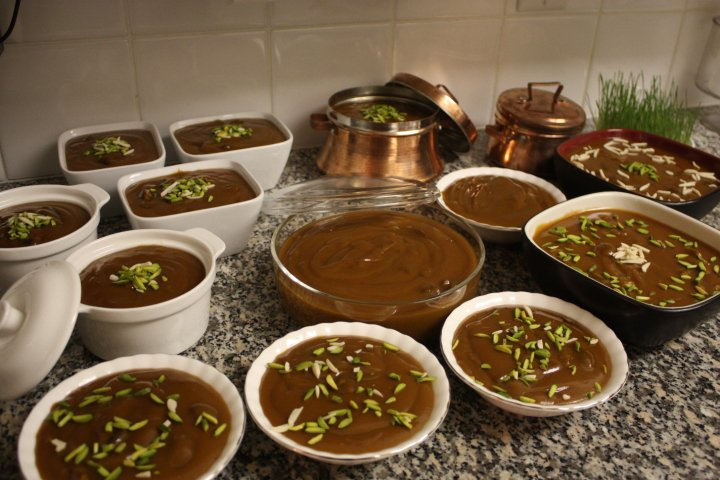
Samanu decorated with pistachio

Malted grains have probably been used as an ingredient of beer since ancient times, for example, in Egypt (Ancient Egyptian cuisine), Sumer, and China.

Originating from the Great Persian Empire and eaten in the Greater Persian countries, a sweet paste made entirely from germinated wheat called samanū (Persian: سمنو) is prepared for Nowruz in a large pot (like a kazan). A plate or bowl of samanu is a traditional component of the Haft-sin table symbolising affluence. Traditionally women have a special party to prepare it during the night and cook it from late in the evening until daylight, singing related songs. In Tajikistan and Afghanistan they sing: Samanak dar Jūsh u mā Kafcha zanēm – Dīgarān dar Khwāb u mā Dafcha zanēm (meaning: "Samanak is boiling and we are stirring it, others are asleep and we are playing daf"). In modern times, making samanu can be a family gathering.

Mämmi, or Easter Porridge, is a traditional Finnish Lenten food. Cooked from rye malt and flour, mämmi has a great resemblance in the recipe, color, and taste to samanū. Today this product is available in shops from February until Easter. A (non-representative) survey in 2013 showed that almost no one cooks mämmi at home in modern-day Finland.

== Malting ==
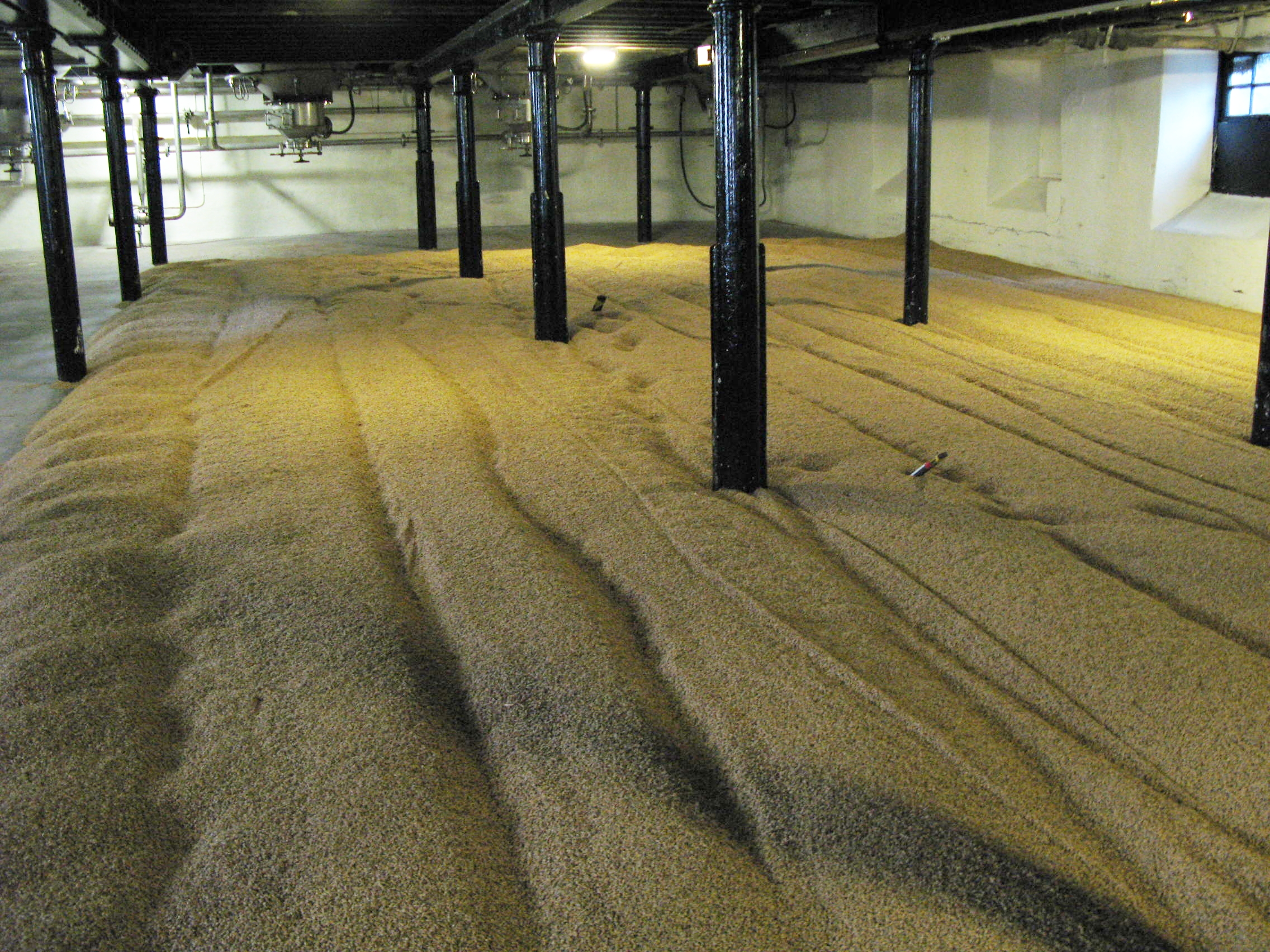
Barley is spread out on the floor of a malthouse during a traditional malting process.

Malting is the conversion of barley or other cereal grains into malt for use in brewing, distilling, or foods. The process takes place in a maltings, sometimes called a malthouse, or on a malting floor where the cereal is spread out in a layer of 8 to 12 centimetres (3 to 4 1/2 inches) in depth.

Drying
Malting begins with drying the grains to a moisture content below 14% and then storing them for around six weeks to overcome seed dormancy.
Steeping
When ready, the grain is immersed or steeped in water two or three times for two or three days to allow the grain to absorb moisture and start to sprout.
Germination
When the grain has a moisture content of around 46%, it is transferred to the malting or germination floor, where it is constantly turned over for about four to six days while it is air-dried.
Pre-toasting
The grain at this point, called green malt, is then dried and toasted in an oven (or kiln) to the desired color and specification. Malts range in color from very pale through crystal and amber to chocolate or black malts.
Smoking
The sprouted grain is further dried and smoked by spreading it on a perforated wooden floor. Smoke from an oasting fireplace (via smoke channels) is then used to heat the floor and sprouted grains, with the temperature usually around 55 °C (131 °F).

A maltings is typically a long, single-storey structure with a floor that slopes slightly from one end of the building to the other. Floor maltings began to be phased out in the 1940s in favor of pneumatic plants, in which large industrial fans are used to blow air through the germinating grain beds and to pass hot air through the malt when being kilned. Like floor maltings, these pneumatic plants use batch processes but of considerably greater size, typically 100-ton batches compared with 20-ton batches in floor maltings.

As of 2014 the largest malting operation in the world was Malteurop, which operates in 14 countries.

== Production ==
Barley is the most commonly malted grain, in part because of its high content of enzymes, though wheat, rye, oats, rice, and corn are also used. Also very important is the retention of the grain's husk, even after threshing, unlike the bare seeds of threshed wheat or rye. This protects the growing acrospire (developing plant embryo) from damage during malting, which can easily lead to mold growth; it also allows the mash of converted grain to create a filter bed during lautering.

== Malts ==
=== Diastatic and nondiastatic ===
As all grains sprout, natural enzymes within break down the grain's starch into simpler sugars, which taste sweet and are easier for yeast to consume. Malt with active enzymes is called diastatic malt. Malt with inactive enzymes is called nondiastatic malt. The enzymes are deactivated by heating the malt to a certain temperature.

=== Base and specialty ===
Malt is often divided into two categories by brewers: base malts and specialty malts.

Base malts have enough diastatic power to convert their own starch and usually some amount of starch from unmalted grains called adjuncts.

Specialty malts have little diastatic power but provide flavor, color, or "body" (viscosity) to the finished beer. Specialty caramel or crystal malts have been subjected to heat treatment to convert their starches to sugars nonenzymatically. Within these categories is a variety of types distinguished largely by the kilning temperature.

=== Two-row and six-row ===
Additionally barley malts are distinguished by the two major cultivar types of barley used for malting, two-row and six-row.

== Malt extract ==
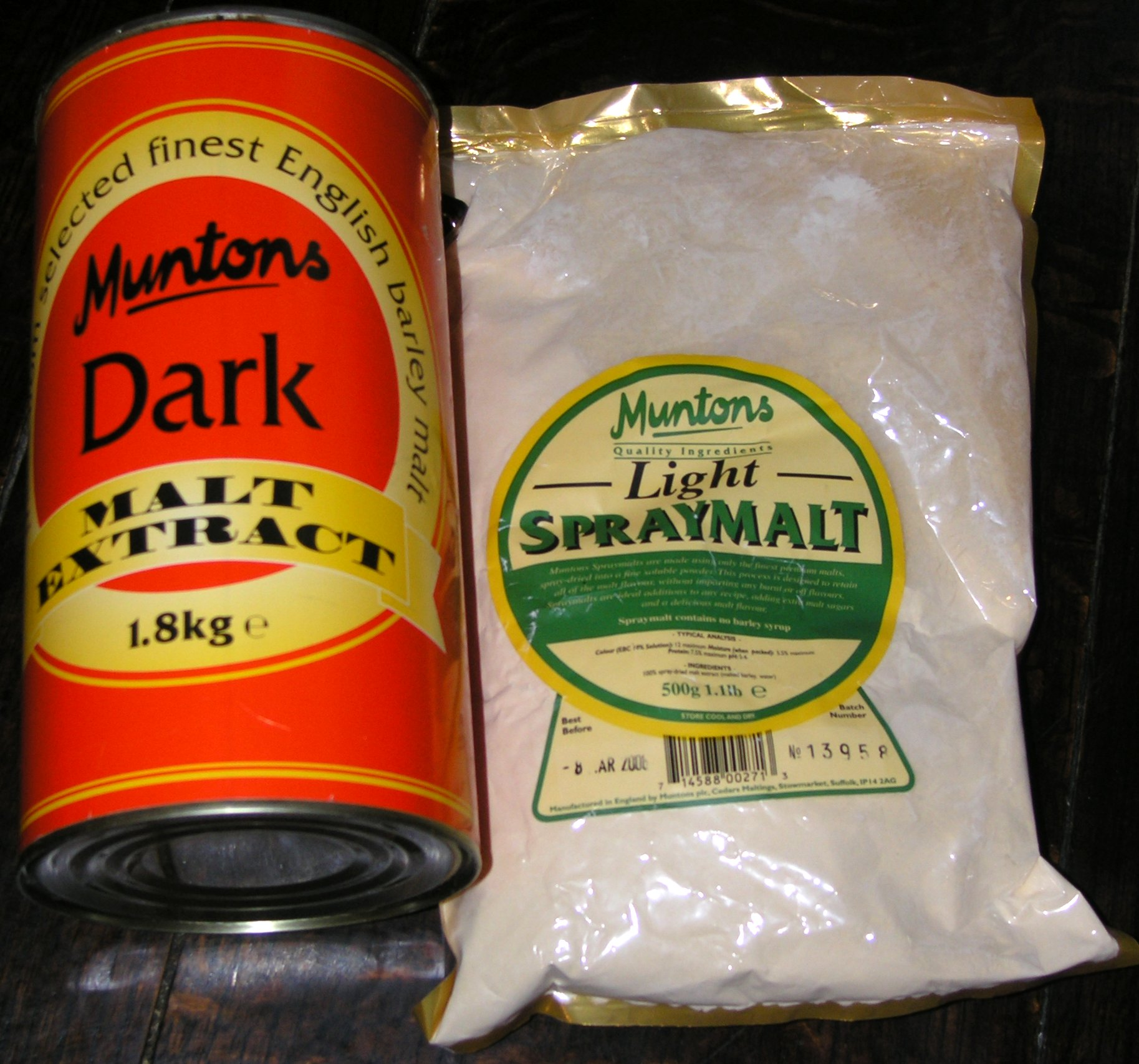
Homebrewing malt extracts: liquid (left) and spray-dried (right)

Barley malt syrup (LME) being added to flour in a bagel recipe

Malt extract, also known as extract of malt, is a sweet, treacle-like substance used as a dietary supplement. It was popular in the first half of the 20th century as a nutritional enhancer for the children of the British urban working class, whose diet was often deficient in vitamins and minerals. Children were given cod liver oil for the same reason, but it proved so unpalatable that it was combined with extract of malt to produce "Malt and Cod-Liver Oil."

The 1907 British Pharmaceutical Codex's instructions for making a nutritional extract of malt do not include a mashout at the end of extraction but rather the use of lower mash temperatures than is typical with modern beer-brewing practices. The Codex indicates that diastatic activity is to be preserved by the use of temperatures not exceeding 55 °C (131 °F).

=== Malt extract production ===
Malt extract is frequently used in the brewing of beer. Its production begins by germinating barley grain in a process known as malting, which consists of immersing the barley in water to encourage it to sprout and then drying it. The drying step stops the sprouting, but the enzymes remain active due to the low temperatures used in base malt production. In one before-and-after comparison malting decreased barley's extractable starch content by about 7% on a dry matter basis and turned that portion into various other carbohydrates.

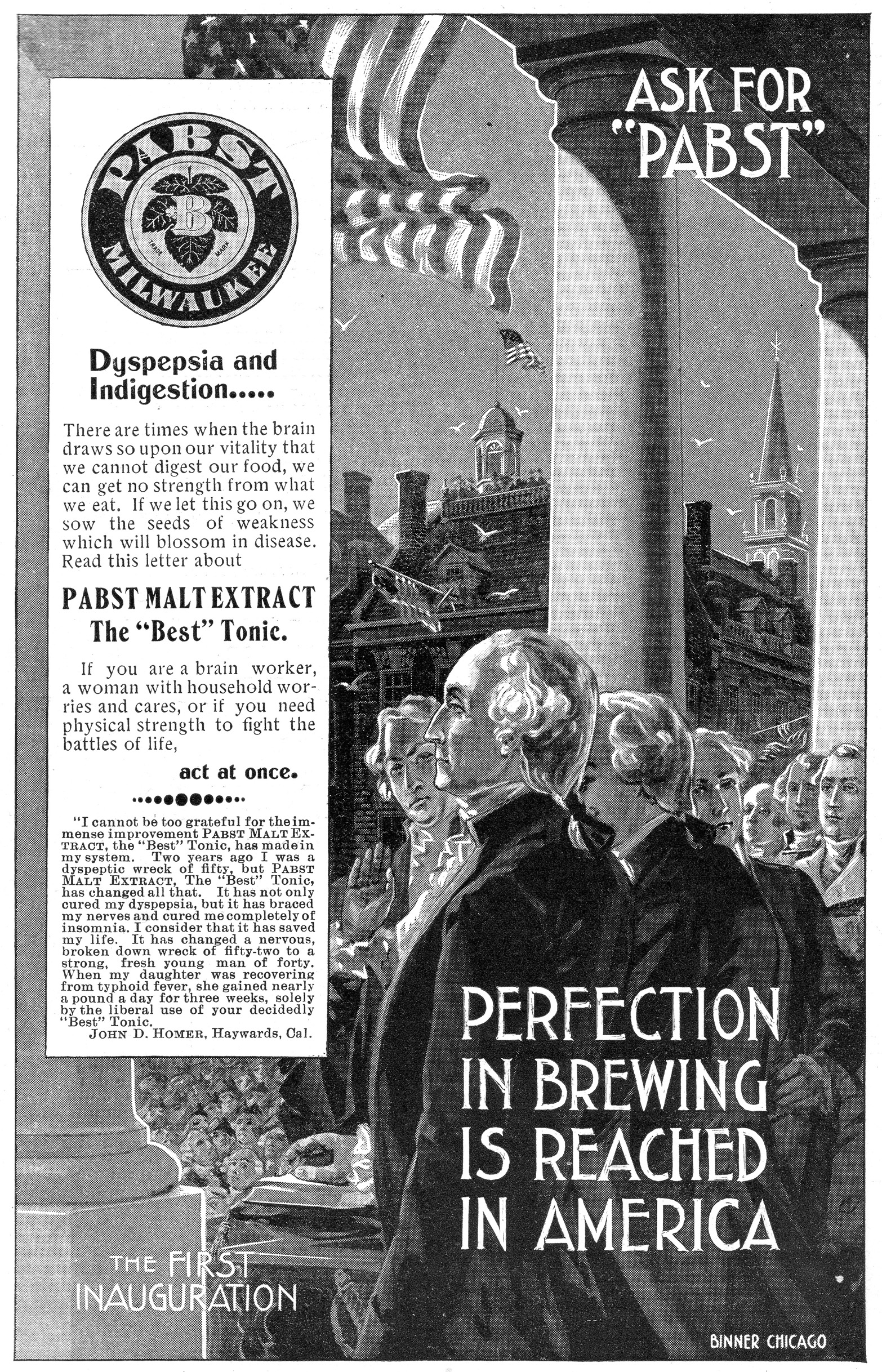
1897 Pabst Malt Extract ad

In the next step brewers use a process called mashing to extract the sugars. Brewers warm cracked malt in temperature-modulated water, activating the enzymes, which cleave more of the malt's remaining starch into various sugars, the largest percentage of which is maltose. Modern beer-mashing practices typically include high enough temperatures at mashout to deactivate remaining enzymes, thus making it no longer diastatic. The liquid produced, called wort, is then concentrated by using heat or a vacuum procedure to evaporate water from the mixture. The concentrated wort is called malt extract.

=== Malt extract types ===
Two forms of malt extract are used by brewers: liquid malt extract (LME), containing about 20% water, and dry malt extract (DME), dehydrated to 2% water. LME is a thick syrup that typically gives off more pleasant flavors than its counterpart, while DME provides better consistency in color. When using large amounts of extract, LME is typically used because of its ability to dissolve in boiling temperatures, whereas DME can clump up and become difficult to liquefy. LME is also sold in jars as a consumer product.

== Research ==
Scientists aim to discover what happens inside barley grains as they become malted to help plant breeders produce better malting barley for food and beverage products. The United States Agricultural Research Service scientists are interested in specialized enzymes called serine-class proteases that digest beta-amylases, which convert carbohydrates into simple sugars during the sprouting process. The enzyme also breaks down stored proteins into their amino-acid derivatives. The balance of proteins and carbohydrates broken down by the enzyme affects the malt's flavor.

=== Enzyme-rich malt extract ===
Enzyme-rich malt extract (ERME) is a specialised form of barley malt extract (marketed by Ateria Health) that has undergone preparation to activate the natural amylase and glucanase enzymes in the grain. Initially researched as an equine food supplement, pilot studies using ERME as a human food supplement have suggested that it could potentially improve the symptoms of Irritable Bowel Syndrome (IBS) and chronic constipation due to the way it can break down carbohydrates in the small intestine that IBS has been found to hinder. However, further research is ongoing to fully prove this link.

== See also ==
- Malt beer
- Malt beverage
- Malta (soft drink)
- Radio Malt
- Sprouted bread
- Wheatgrass
