= Nowruz in Afghanistan =

Cultural holiday in Afghanistan

Nowruz
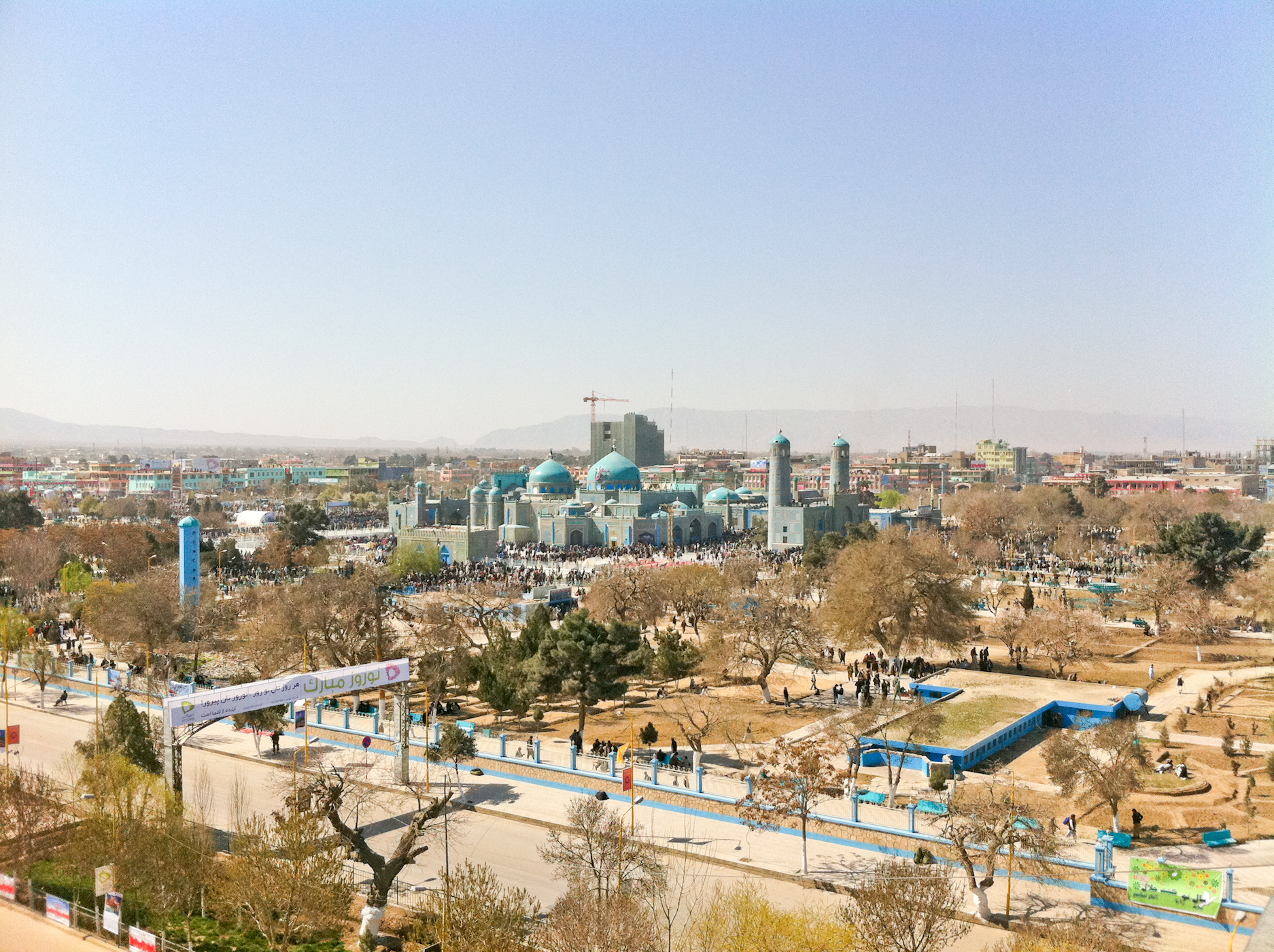
- Nowruz in Mazar-i-Sharif, Afghanistan (21 March 2011)
- Also called: Farmer's Day
- Date: 21 March
- Duration: Two Weeks
- Frequency: Annual
- Related to: Nowruz

Nawrouz, Novruz, Nowrouz, Nowrouz, Nawrouz, Nauryz, Nooruz, Nowruz, Navruz, Nevruz, Nowruz, Navruz
- UNESCO Intangible Cultural Heritage
- Country: Afghanistan, Azerbaijan, India, Iran, Iraq, Kazakhstan, Kyrgyzstan, Pakistan, Tajikistan, Turkey, Turkmenistan, and Uzbekistan
- Reference: 01161
- Region: Asia and the Pacific

Inscription history
- Inscription: 2016 (4th session)
- List: Representative

Nowruz (Note: Dari: نوروز, romanized: Nawrōz, cyrillized: Наврӯз, pronounced [naʊˈɾoːz]; Pashto: نوورځ / نوی کال, romanized: Nawwraź / Nəway Kāl, pronounced [nɐʊˈrad͡z / ˈnəwɐɪ kɑl]) is the beginning of springtime and a cultural holiday in Afghanistan. It is also celebrated by the majority of the Afghan diaspora around the world. Farmer's Day, which starts around the same time as the Afghan New Year, is celebrated nationwide alongside Nowruz and usually lasts around two weeks. Among other things, the celebration involves planting saplings and flowers throughout the country.

Some Afghans, including members of the Taliban and their supporters, do not observe Nowruz traditions. In 1985, Radio Television Afghanistan aired a Persian play to commemorate and promote Nowruz. Under the 1990s Taliban rule, Nowruz was banned "due to the thought that it was a pagan holiday centered on fire worship." After the fall of Kabul in 2021, the Islamic Emirate of Afghanistan officially cancelled the holiday, but clarified that they will not prevent people from celebrating it privately.

Preparations for Nowruz start several days beforehand, at least after Chaharshanbe Suri, the last Wednesday before the New Year. Among various traditions and customs, the most important ones are listed below (in alphabetical order):

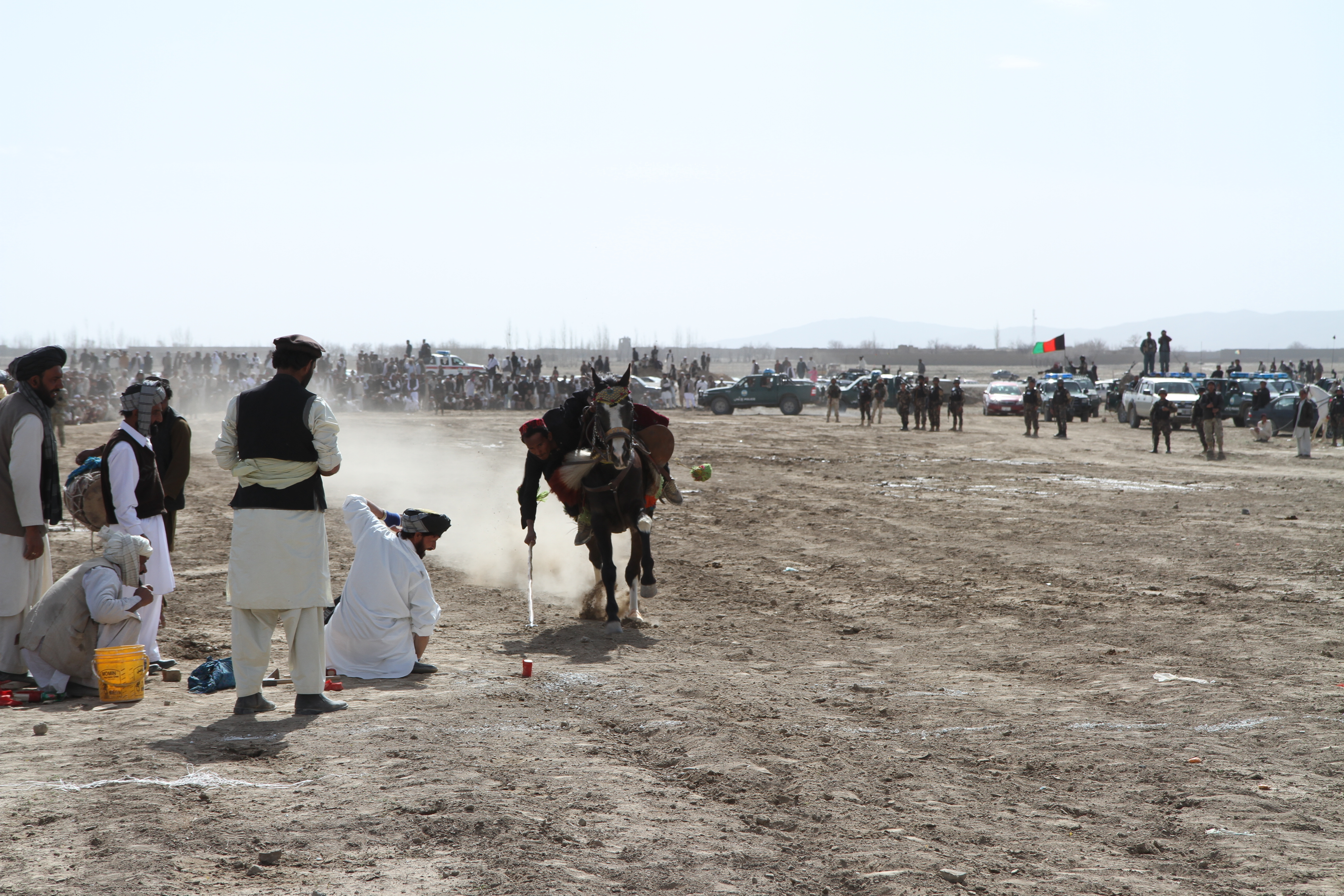
Tent pegging in Paktika Province of Afghanistan (21 March 2013)

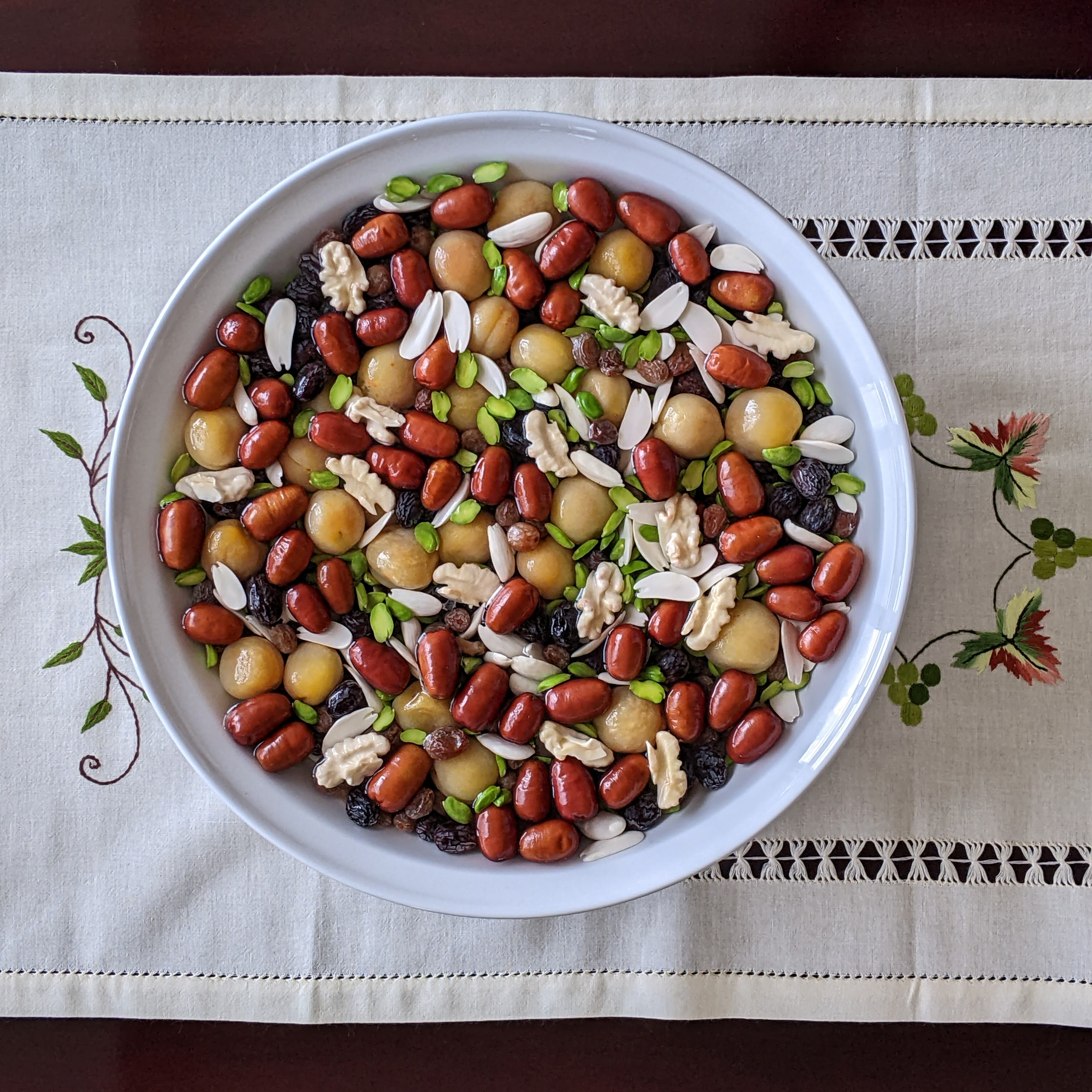
Haft Mewa

- Buzkashi (Dari: بزکشی): Along with other traditional games, a tournament of buzkashi is held during the Guli Surkh festival in Mazar-i-Sharif and other places in the country.
- Guli Surkh festival (Dari: ميلهٔ گل سرخ; lit. 'Red Flower Festival', referring to the red Tulip flowers) is the principal festival for Nowruz. It is celebrated in Mazar-i- Sharif during the first 40 days of the year when the Tulip flowers grow in the green plains and on the hills surrounding the city. People from all over the country travel to Mazar-i-Sharif to attend the Nowruz festivals.
- In Afghanistan, people prepare Haft Mēwa (Dari: هفت میوه; lit. 'Seven Fruits'), in addition to or instead of Haft Sin, which is common in Iran. Haft Mewa is like a fruit salad made from seven different dried fruits, served in their own syrup. The seven dried fruits are: raisins, Senjed (the dried fruit of the oleaster tree), pistachios, hazelnuts, prunes (dried apricots), walnuts and either almonds or another species of plum fruit.
- Jahanda Bala (Dari: جهنده بالا) is celebrated on the first day of the New Year (i.e., Nowruz). It is a specific religious ceremony performed in specific mosques. The ceremony is performed by raising a special banner whose color configuration resembles Derafsh Kaviani. This is the biggest recorded Nowruz gathering where up to 200,000 people from all over Afghanistan get together in Mazar-i-Sharif's central park around the Blue Mosque to celebrate the banner raising (Jahanda Bala) ceremony.
- Jashn-e Dehqān (Dari: جشن دهقان; lit. 'The Festival of Farmers') is celebrated on the first day of year, on which the farmers walk in the cities as a sign of encouragement for the agricultural production. In recent years, this activity is being performed only in Kabul and other major cities, in which the mayor and other high governmental personalities participate in watching and observing.
- Kampirak (Dari: کمپیرک): Like "Amu Nowruz" in Iran, he is an old bearded man wearing colorful clothes with a long hat and rosary who symbolizes beneficence and the power of nature yielding the forces of winter. He and his retinue pass village by village distributing gathered charities among people and do shows like reciting poems. The tradition is observed in central provinces specially Bamyan and Daykundi.
- Samanak (Dari: سمنک) is a special type of sweet dish made from germinated wheat, and is normally cooked or prepared on the eve of Nowruz or a few days before. Women have a special party for it during the night, and cook it from late in the evening till daylight, singing a special song: Samanak dar Josh o mā Kafcha zanem – Dochtaran* dar Khwāb o mā Dafcha zanem (* Dochter means daughter, young lady or girl).
- Sightseeing to Cercis fields: The citizens of Kabul go to Istalif, Charikar or other green places where the Cercis flowers grow. They go for a picnic with their family during the first two weeks of the new year.
- Special cuisine: People cook special types of dishes for Nowruz, especially on the eve of Nowruz. Normally they cook Sabzi Chalaw, a dish made from rice and spinach. Moreover, the bakeries prepare a special type of cookie, called Kulcha-e Nowruzī, which is only baked for Nowruz. Another dish which is prepared mostly for the Nowruz days is Māhī wa Jelabī (lit. 'Fried Fish and Jelabi'), which is the most common meal in picnics. In Afghanistan, it is a common custom among the affianced families that the fiancé's family give presents to or prepare special dishes for the fiancée's family on special occasions such as the two Eids (Eid ul-Fitr and Eid al-Adha), Barā'at and Nowruz. Hence, the special dish for Nowruz is Māhī wa Jelabī.

== See also ==
- Culture of Afghanistan
