= Kolcheh nowrozi =

Kolcheh nowrozi, also known as kulchai nowruzi or Kulcha-e Nowruzī, are traditional cookies originating from Afghanistan. They are made with rosewater and rice flour, have fork-created grooves on top of the cookies, and are wrapped in colorful tissue paper. Kolcheh nowrozi are only baked for Nowruz.

== See also ==
- Nauryz kozhe
- Sabzi polo
- Samanu
