= Nauryz kozhe =

Kazakh drink

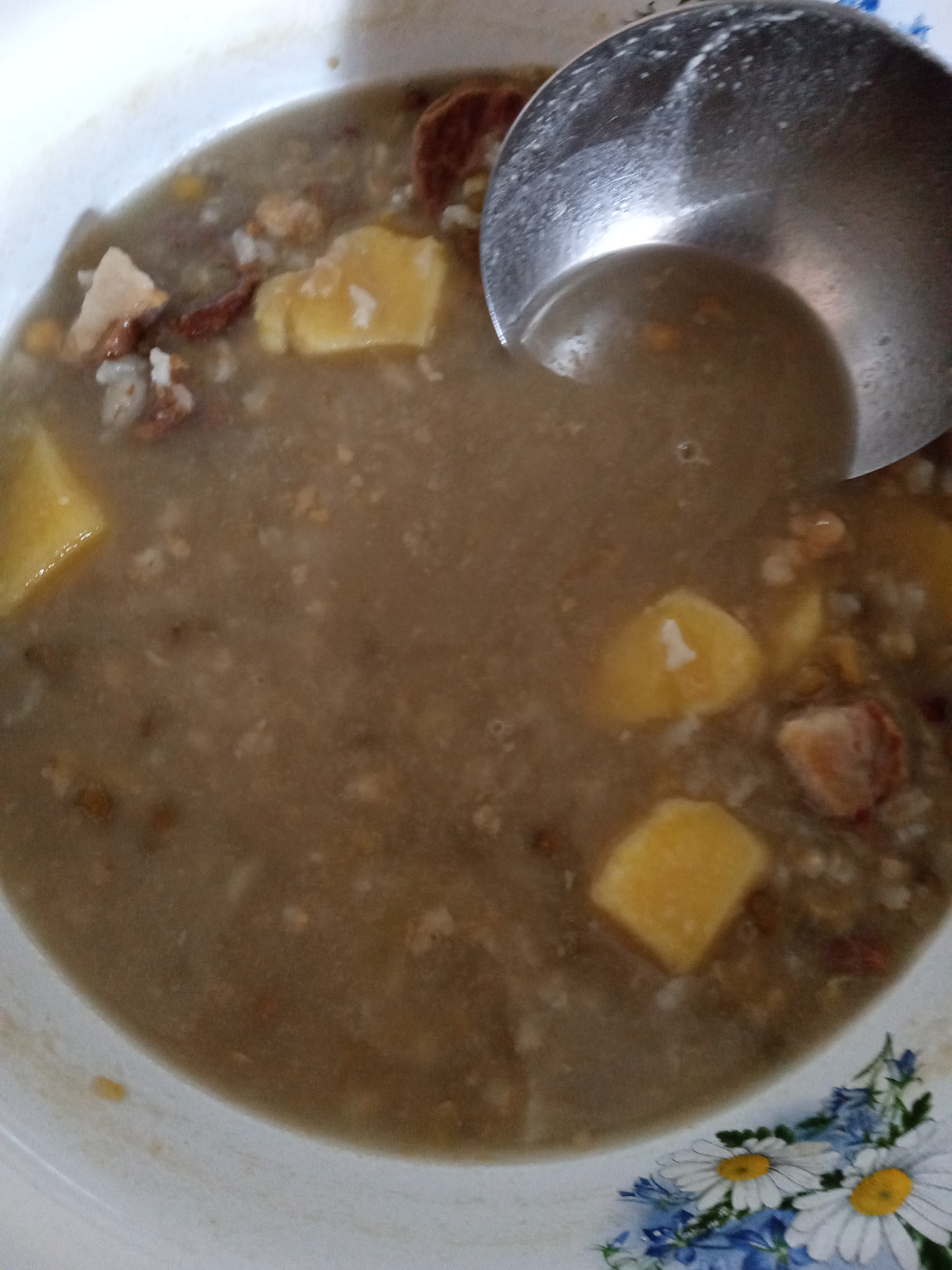
- Traditional Kazakh and Kyrgyz soup - Nauryz kozhe (Nooruz kozho)
- Alternative names: Nauryz kozhe ناۋرىز كوجە; Nooruz kozho
- Place of origin: Kazakhstan; Kyrgyzstan
- Main ingredients: Milk (Kazakh), broth (Kyrgyz), horse meat, salt, kashk, grains

Nauryz kozhe (Kazakh: Наурыз көже) or Nooruz kozho (Kyrgyz: Нооруз көжө) is a Kazakh/Kyrgyz drink of milk (in Kazakhstan) or broth (in Kyrgyzstan), horse meat, salt, kashk and grains.

On Nowruz, the Persian New Year, Kazakhs and Kyrgyz start the new year with this drink for good luck because it is considered a symbol of wealth and richness in the coming year. It consists of seven food elements, such as milk or broth, meat, oil, millet, rice, raisins, corn (the recipe can vary).

== See also ==
- Kazakh cuisine
- Culture of Kazakhstan
- Kyrgyz cuisine
- Culture of Kyrgyzstan
- Kolcheh nowrozi
- Sabzi polo
- Samanu
