= Sabzi polo =

Iranian rice and herb dish

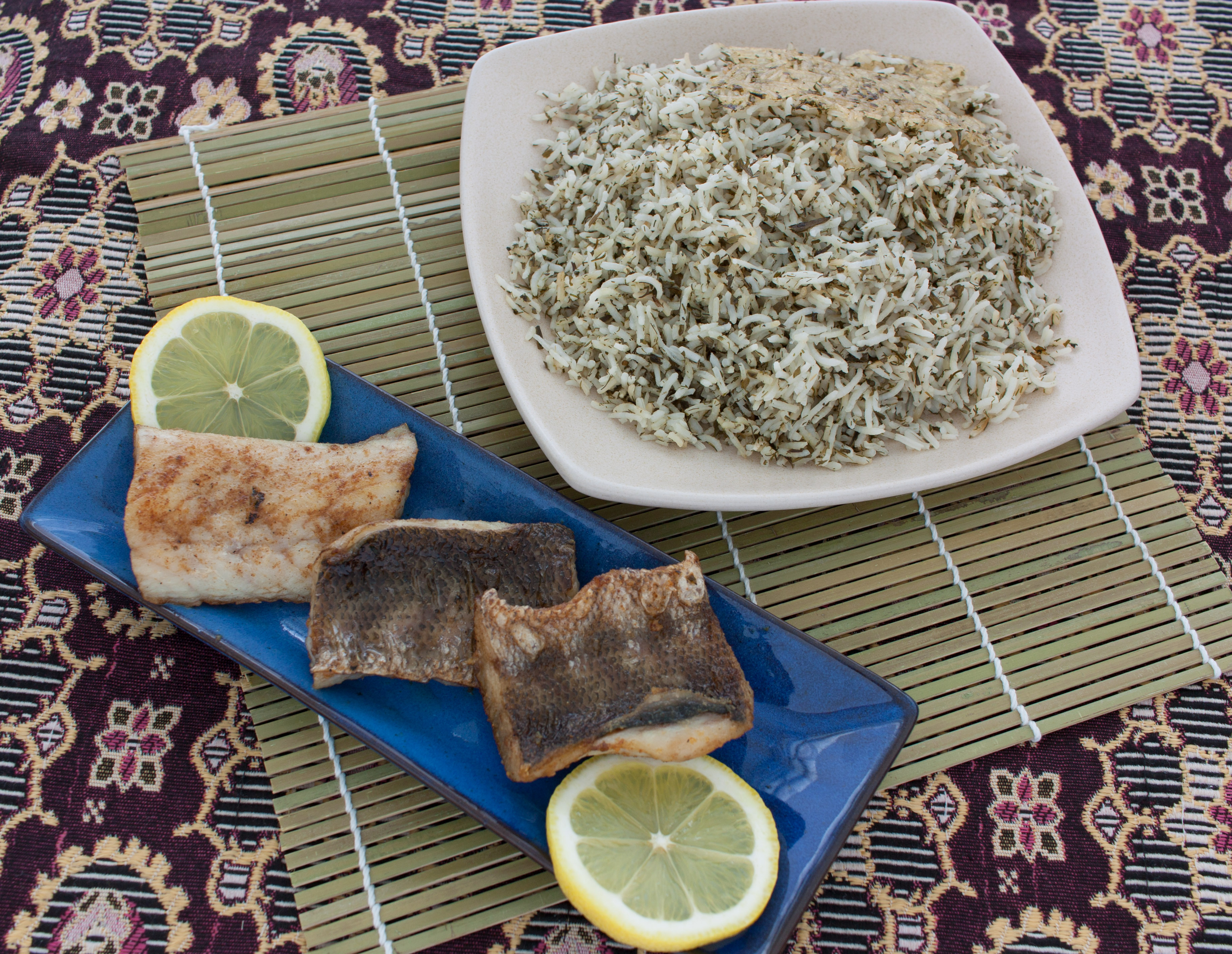
- Alternative names: Sabzi Polo
- Course: Main course
- Place of origin: Iran (Persia)
- Region or state: Iran
- Created by: Persians
- Main ingredients: Herbs (parsley, leeks or green onions, cilantro, spinach), dried fenugreek leaves

Sabzi polo (Persian: سبزی پلو) is a Persian dish of rice and chopped herbs, usually served with fish. In Persian, sabzi refers to herbs or vegetables (sabz means "green"); polo is pilaf, a traditional Persian style of cooked rice.

The herbs used in sabzi polo vary, but typically include coriander, dill, chives or scallions, fenugreek, garlic and parsley. It can be made from both fresh and dried herbs.

Iranians traditionally eat sabzi polo with māhi sefid ("white fish", the Caspian kutum) for lunch on Nowruz, the Persian New Year, with their family and relatives. It usually is served with Seer Torshi (pickled garlic) and other traditional pickled herbs and vegetables.

== See also ==
- Iranian cuisine
- Culture of Iran
- Polow (pilaf, polo, pelau)
- Khoresht
- Kolcheh nowrozi
- Nauryz kozhe
