= Mämmi =

Finnish rye-based dessert associated with Easter celebrations

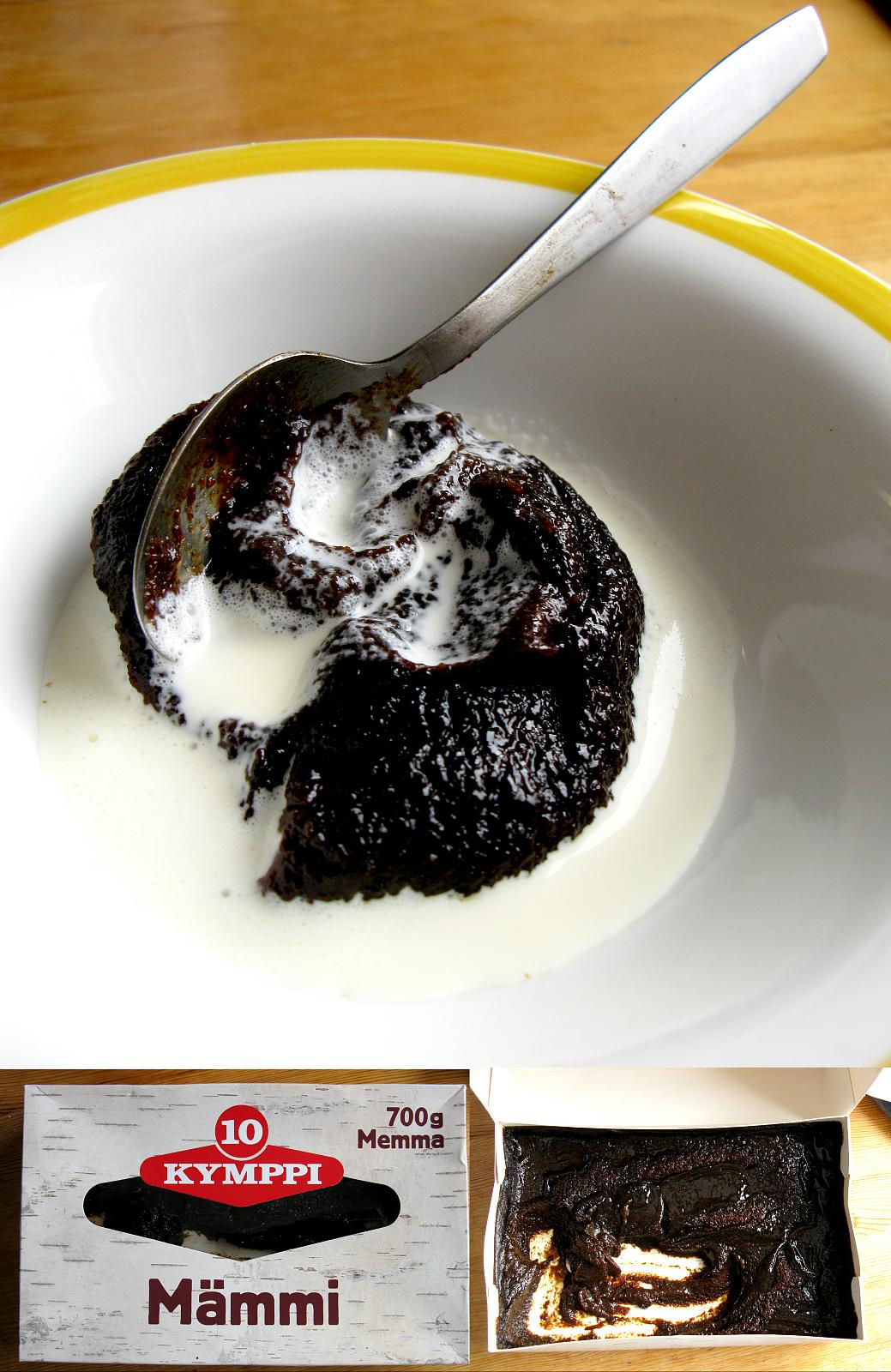
- Alternative names: Memma (Swedish)
- Type: Dessert
- Place of origin: Finland
- Main ingredients: Water, rye flour, powdered malted rye, (molasses), Seville orange zest, salt

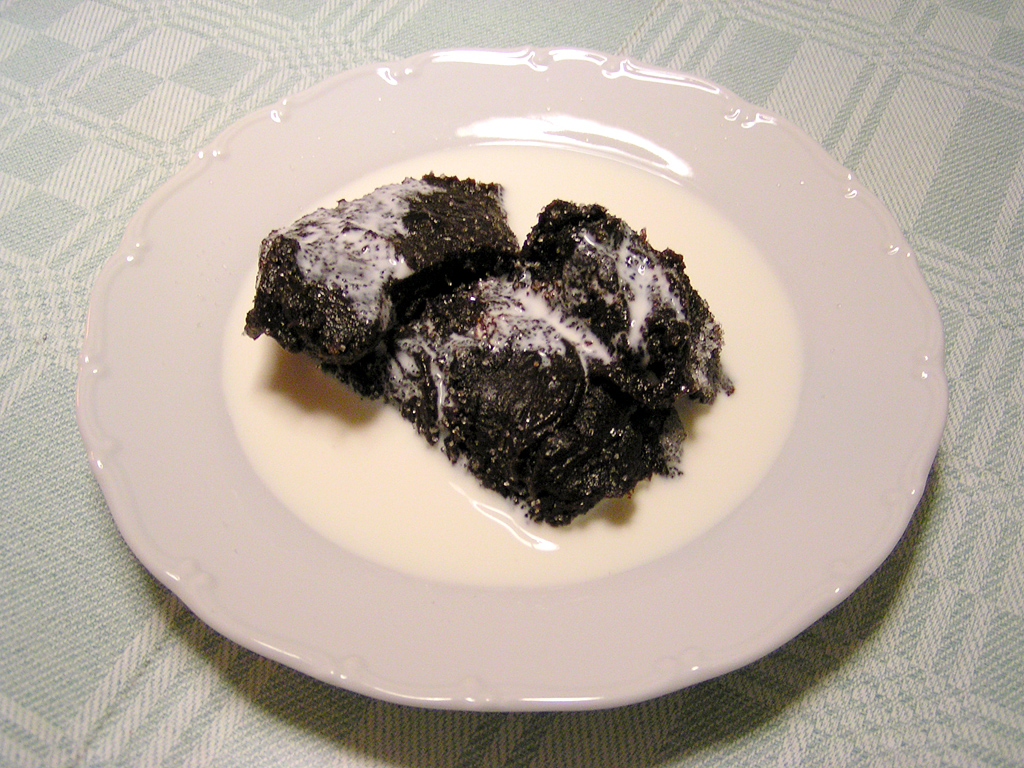
Mämmi with cream and sugar

Mämmi (Finnish: [ˈmæmːi]; Swedish: memma) is a traditional Finnish dessert, eaten around Easter.

Mämmi is traditionally made of water, rye flour, ground malted rye, salt, and dried, ground Seville orange zest. The mixture is then left to sweeten naturally, before being baked in an oven until set, by which time the colour and flavour has developed due to the Maillard reaction. After baking, the mämmi is chilled for three to four days before serving. Unlike traditional mämmi, which is left to sweeten naturally, commercially made mämmi is usually seasoned with dark molasses. Traditional mämmi has an aromatic and sweet flavour, consisting of just 2% sugar or less, whereas commercially produced mämmi can contain as much as 20% sugar and is therefore much different in flavour. Mämmi has up to 10% protein and is rich in trace elements. Traditionally, mämmi was stored in small boxes made of birch bark called tuokkonen or rove, the appearance of which is now mimicked by commercial packaging.

Typically, mämmi is eaten cold, with either milk or cream and sugar, and less commonly with vanilla sauce. Traditionally, it was also eaten on sliced bread as a spread. There is a Finnish society for mämmi founded by Ahmed Ladarsi, the former chef at the Italian Embassy in Helsinki, who has developed around fifty recipes containing mämmi. There are a number of websites with recipes using mämmi, most of them Finnish. Mämmi is also used as a minor ingredient in a mämmi beer by Laitilan Wirvoitusjuomatehdas.

== History ==
Mämmi was first mentioned during the 16th century, in a dissertation (in Latin). It is claimed that it has been eaten in southwestern Finland ever since the 13th century.

Today, Finns rarely make mämmi at home and most modern mämmi is factory-made. Traditional versions of mämmi are sold in Finland with the labels perinteinen (traditional) or luomu (organic). Some people of Finnish descent in North America and Australia still make mämmi at home.

== See also ==
- List of desserts
- Samanu
- Paskha
