= Haft-sin =

Persian ritual display of items to celebrate the start of spring

Haft Seen or Haft sin (Persian: هفت‌سین, lit. 'Seven S's') is an arrangement of seven symbolic items whose names start with the letter "س" (pronounced as "seen"), the 15th letter in the Persian alphabet; "haft" (هفت) is Persian for "seven". It is traditionally displayed at Nowruz, the Iranian New Year, which is celebrated on the day of the vernal equinox, marking the beginning of spring in the Northern Hemisphere. Nowruz, the Iranian New Year, is a celebration of the beginning of spring and the start of a new year celebrated in more than 20 countries. With its special customs and traditions, such as the Haft sin table, this celebration symbolizes renewal and harmony with nature.

Regarding the Nowruz table, according to the narration of Iranian researcher Zana Salehrad, they spread a white tablecloth, placed a mirror on top of the table, which symbolizes the endless world, placed one or more candles or a lamp around the mirror that they did not extinguish, and placed an egg on the mirror, which symbolizes the seed, race, and creation of man, and sprinkled a handful of wheat in front of the mirror as a symbol of sustenance. Also, a loaf of bread, which represents the blessing of the house. A cup full of water with a few drops of rose water poured into it, and next to it was a jug that had not seen water. A cup of water in which they put a few pomegranate or orange leaves. The floating orange is a symbol of the Earth in the universe.

== Items of Haft-seen ==
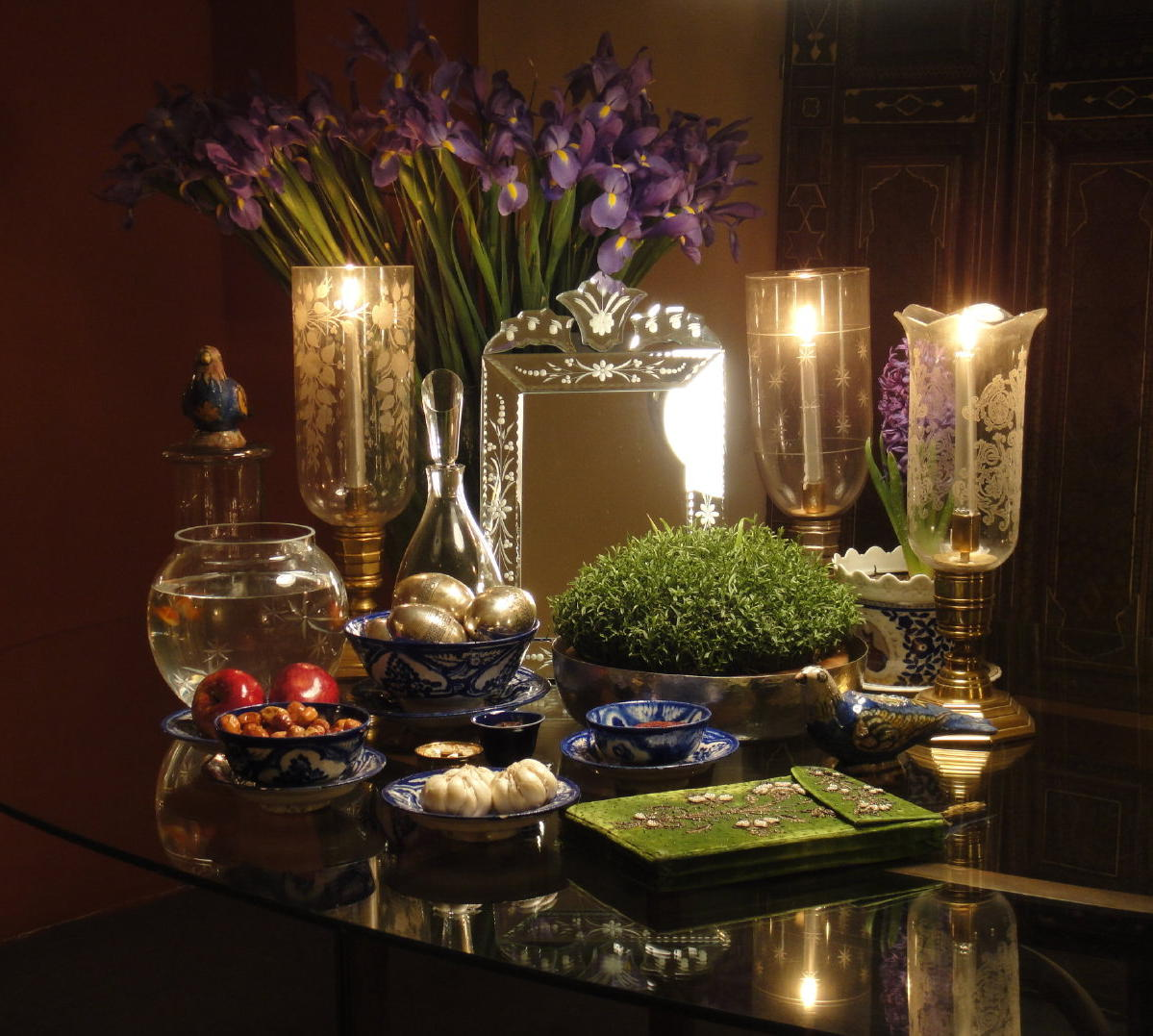
A Haft-Sin Table, Tehran, Iran

The following are the primary items of Haft-seen, whose Persian names begin with the letter S in the Persian alphabet.

1. Sabzeh (سبزه) – wheat, barley, mung bean, or lentil sprouts grown in a dish.
2. Samanu (Also called Samani by Shirazi Persians and Kurds) (سمنو) – wheat germ sweet pudding.
3. Senjed (سنجد) – oleaster.
4. Serkeh (سرکه) – vinegar.
5. Seeb (سیب) – apple.
6. Seer (سیر) – garlic.
7. Somagh (سماق) – sumac.

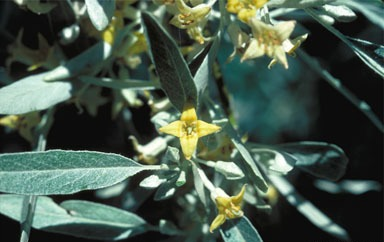
Senjed

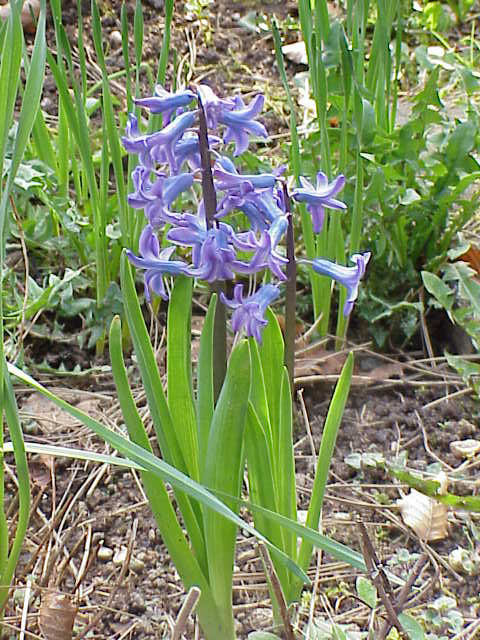
Sonbol

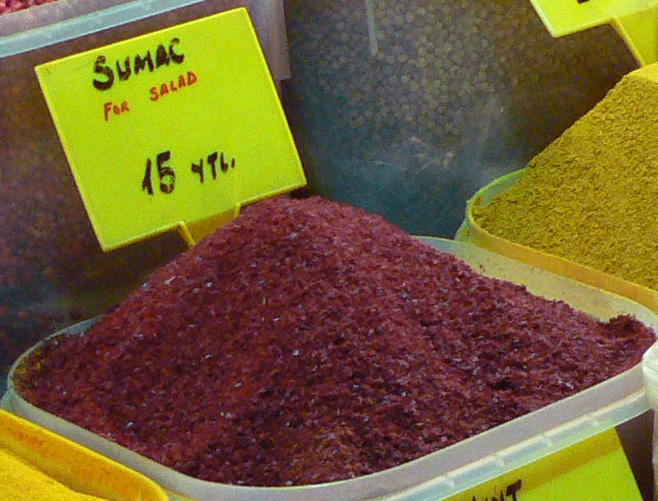
Somāq

Coins (سکه sekke), hyacinth (سنبل sonbol), and a clock or watch (ساعت saa'at) are sometimes included too. Other symbolic items that are typically used to accompany Haft-sin include a mirror, candles, painted eggs, goldfish, and traditional Persian confections.

A "book of wisdom" is also commonly included, which might be, Avesta, the Shahnameh, the Quran or the Divān of Hafez.

Seven was regarded as a sacred number in the Sasanian faith. Sasanians planted seven seeds on seven distinct pillars.

Iranians offer Haft-Sin for either the twelve sacred tower numbers or the number seven Amshaspand. For the first day of spring, they placed items like greenery and water signifying growth and light, milk signifying rebirth, resurrection, and rebirth, a fire pit signifying the sustainability of heat and light, a mirror signifying purity and transparency, a freshly struck coin symbolizing possession and blessing, an egg signifying race and sperm, an oleaster signifying endearment and fertility and birth, an apple signifying the mystery of love, a pomegranate signifying sanctity, an orange representing the Earth sphere, a specific Esfand flower signifying Amshaspand Sepandarms on their tables and a fish signifying the end of the Esfand month.

In addition to the Holy Book, other items in the Sofreh Haft Sin were bread baked from seven grains, cheese, sugar, dates, rose water, olives, branches from the holy pomegranate tree, willow, and figs in bunches of seven, twelve, or three.

According to legend, the Haft Shin table was used by Persians before being given a new name. The Haft Shin table's components were candles (Sham), wine (Sharab), nectar (Shahd), syrup (Sharbat), sweets (Shirini), boxwood (Shamshad), and anemones (Shaqayegh) or plant branches (Shakh-e-Nabat).

When Haft Shin first gained popularity among Iranians during the Sassanid era, Shamshad was set out on the table alongside the other Shins on Nowruz as a representation of longevity and greenness.

Persians used to prepare the "Seven Candles" table during the Sassanid era and before the advent of Islam, which contained wine, candles, sharbat, boxwood, nectar, and anemones. The Persian alphabet "Shin" changed into "Sin" when Islam was introduced to Iran and their "wine" was declared to be unlawful. At this point, its twin, vinegar, was put on the table.

== Gallery ==
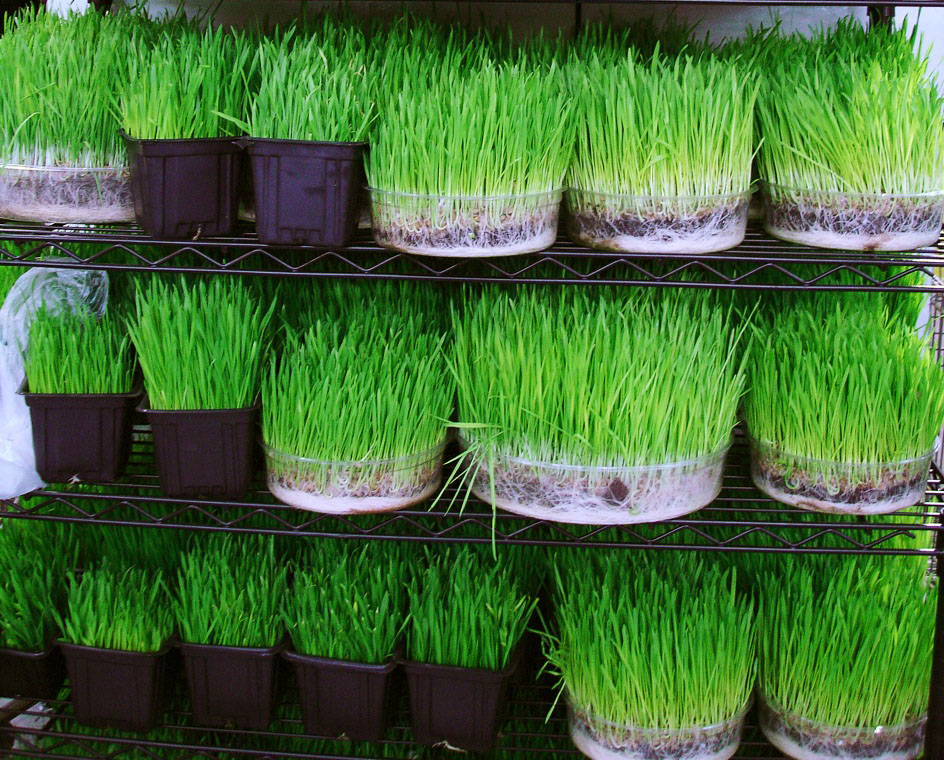
Wheatgrass, one of the items of Haft-sin.

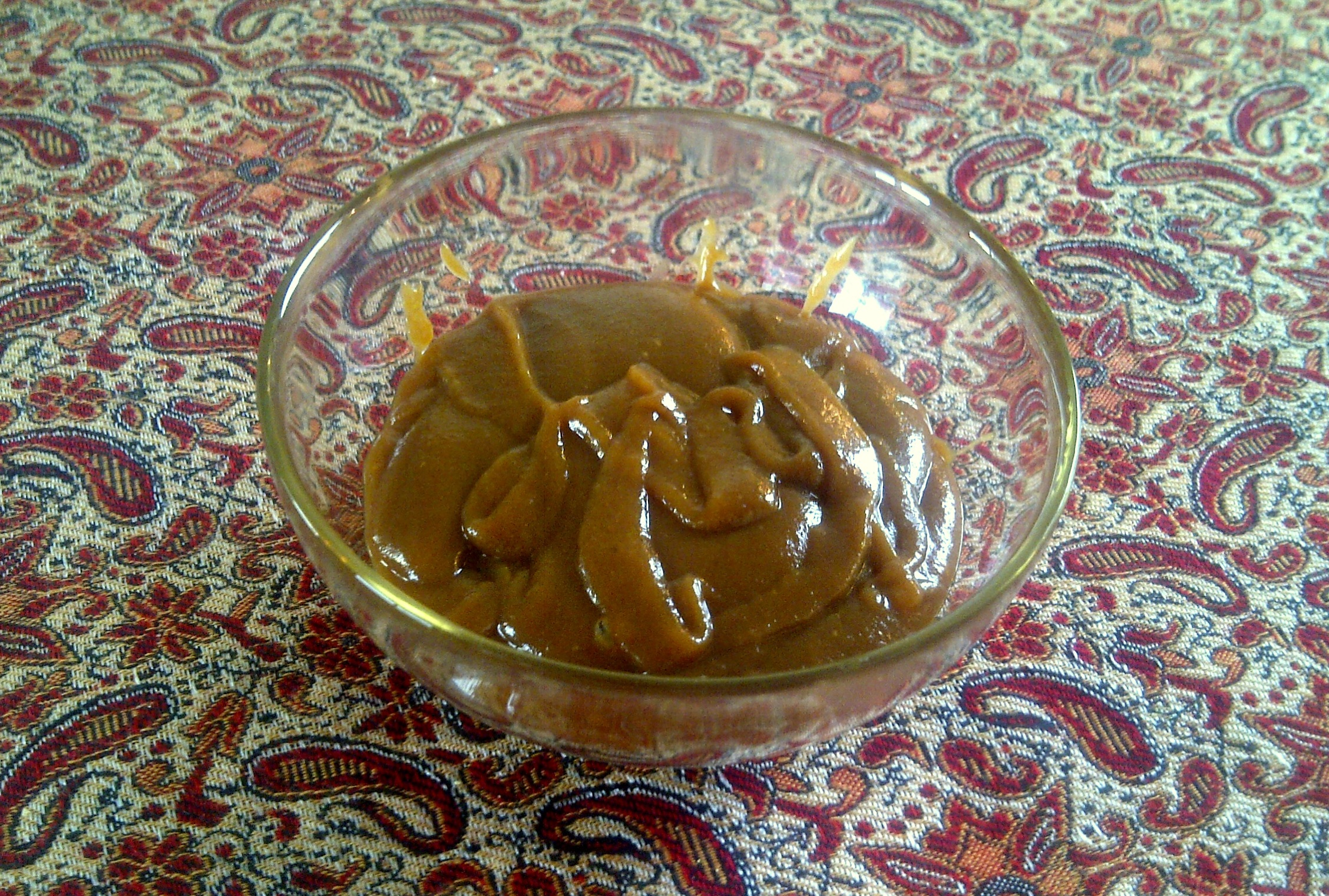
A bowl of samanu, one of the items of Haft-sin.

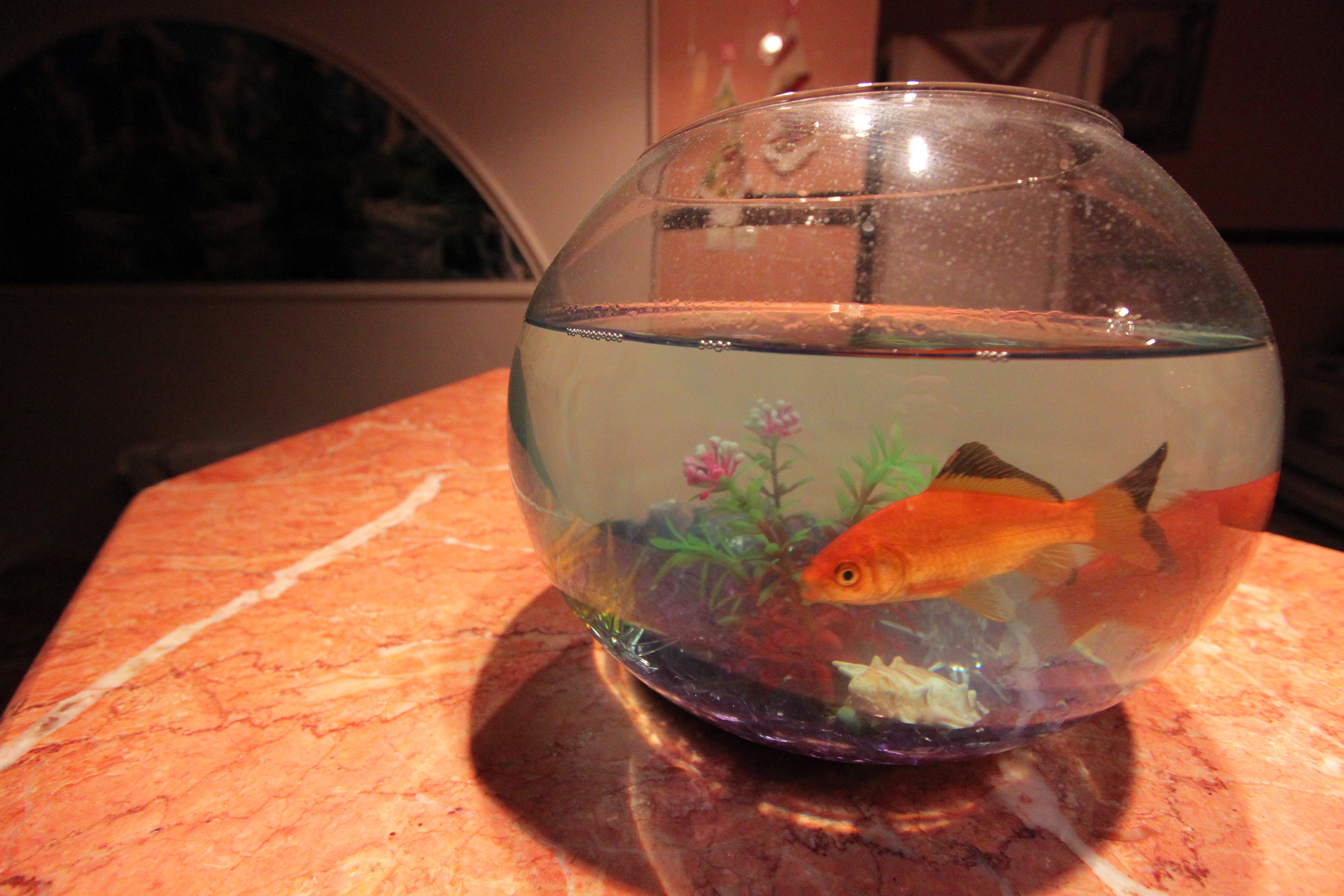
Goldfish, one of the items of Haft-sin.

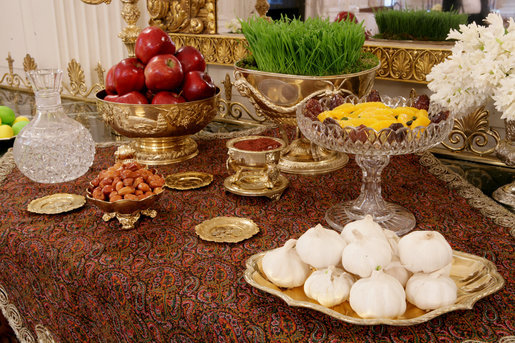
A Haft-sin table at the White House.

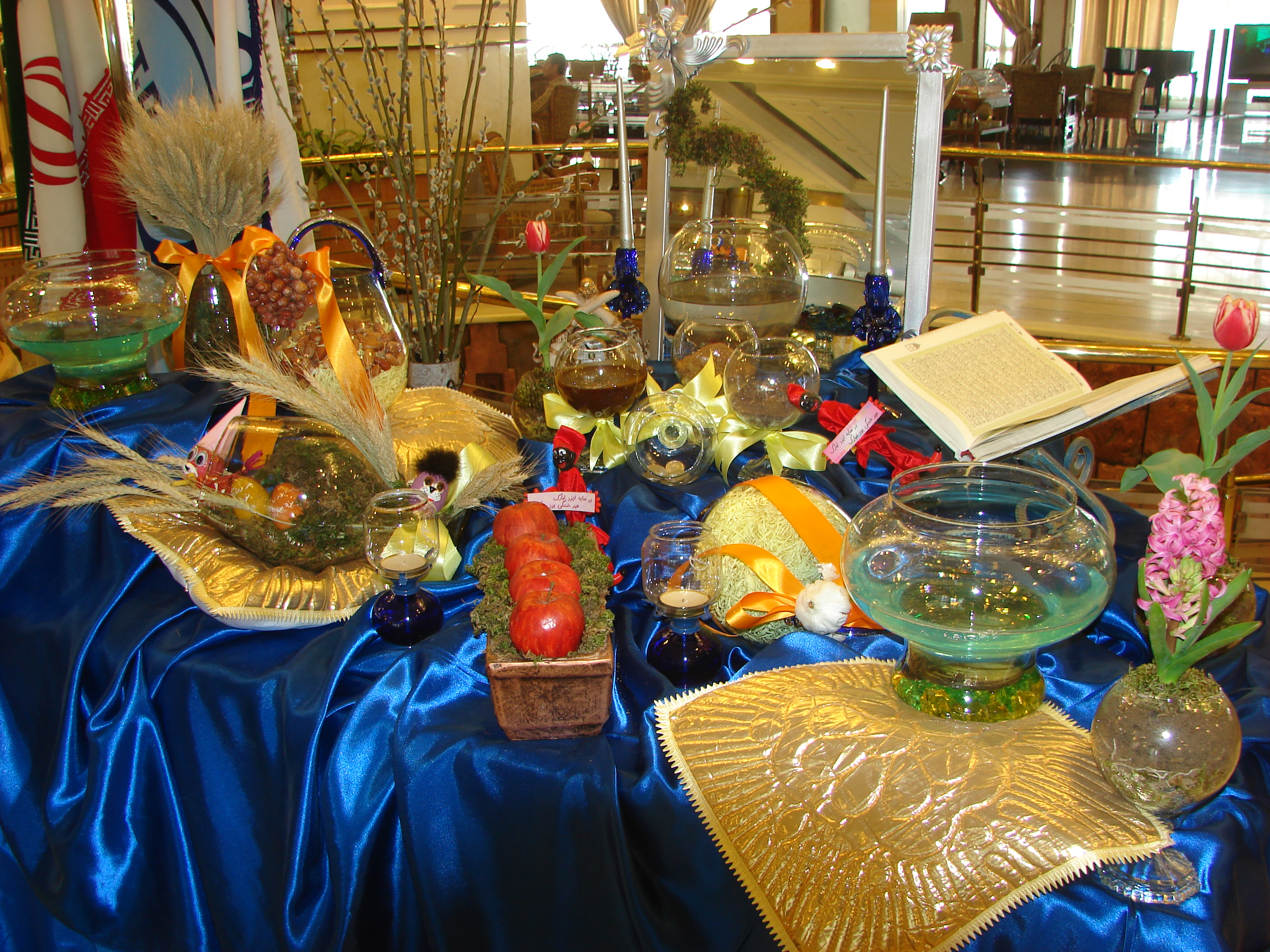
A Haft-sin table at a hotel in Bijar, Kurdistan.

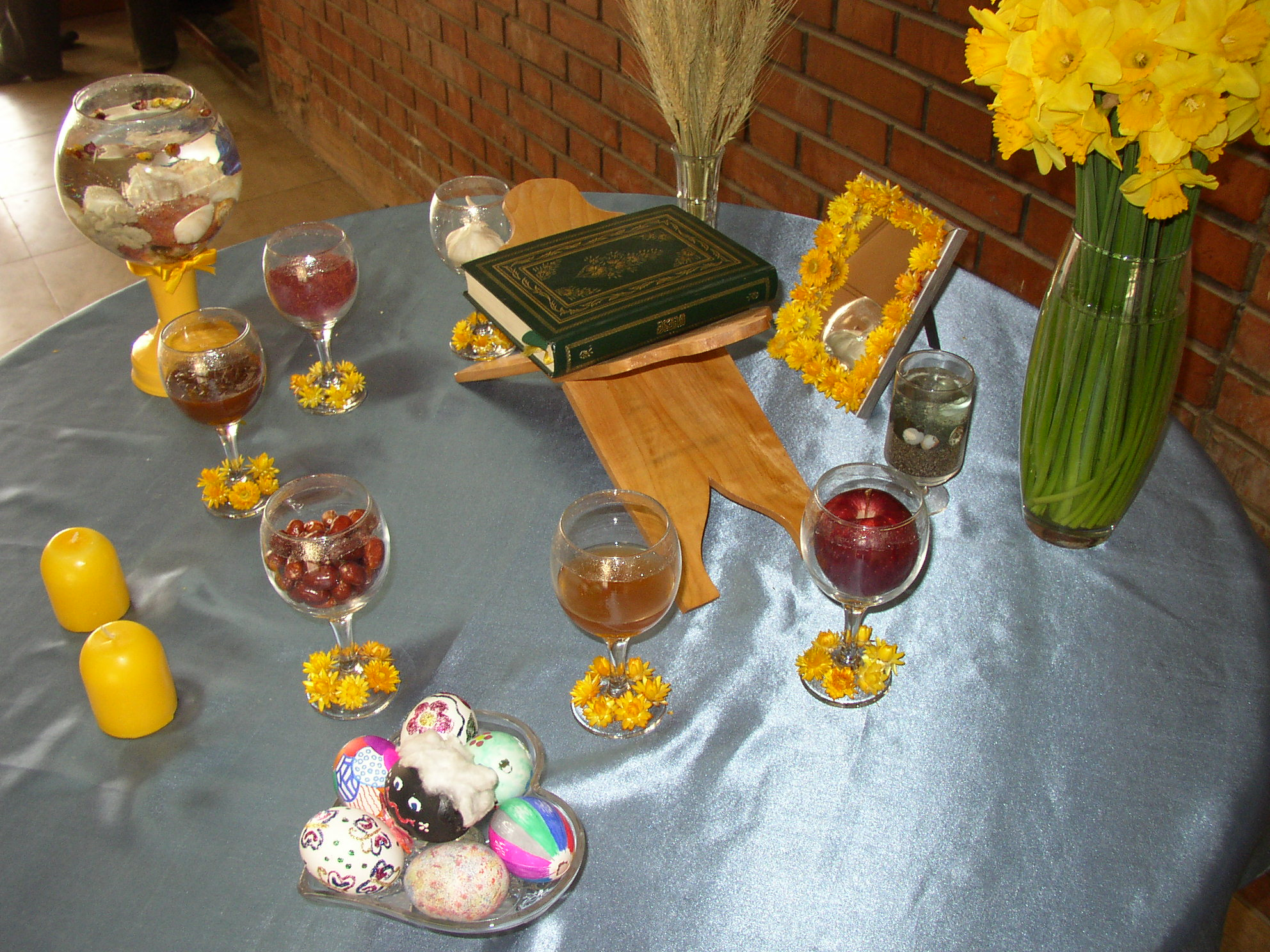
A Haft-sin table at Sharif University of Technology.

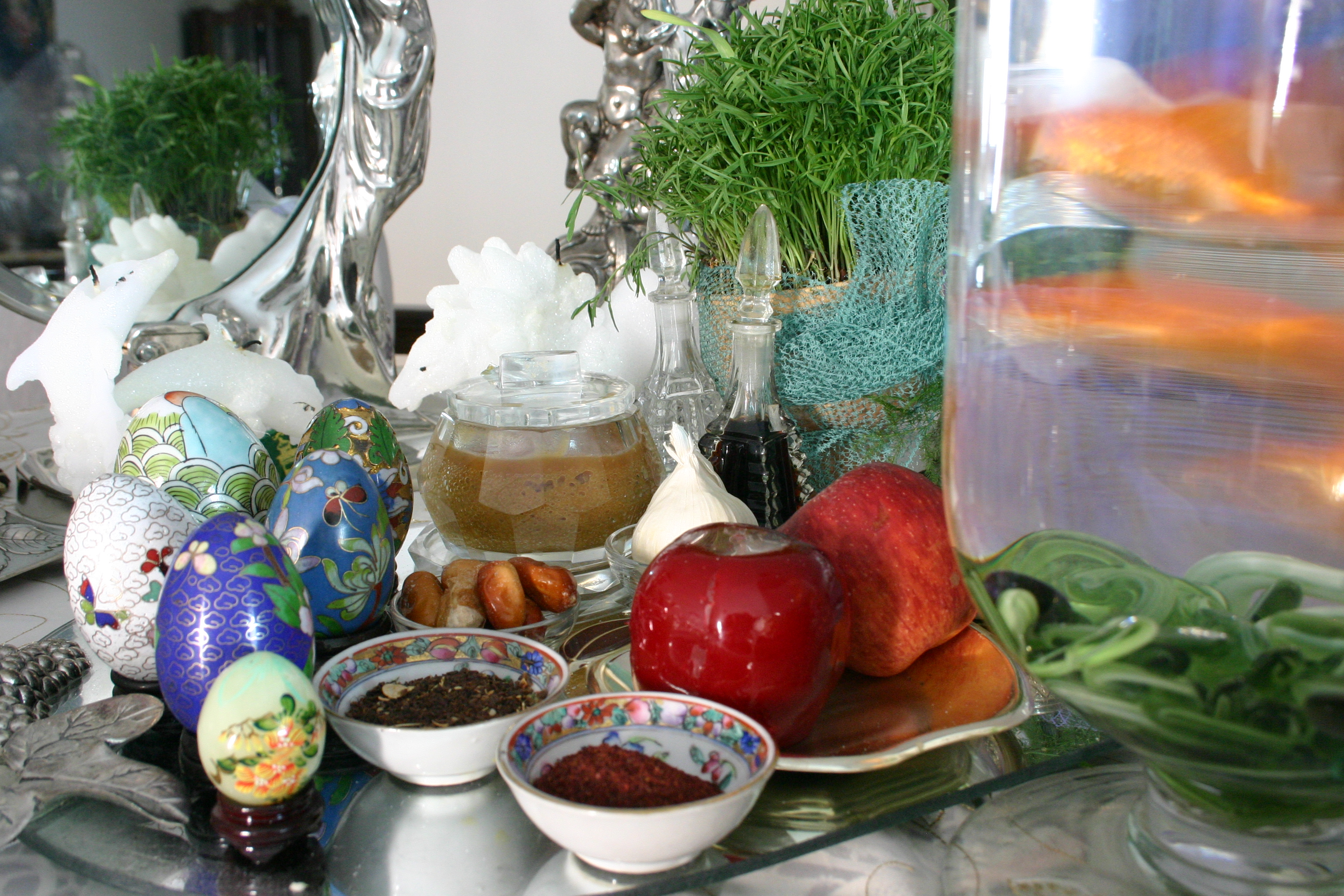
A Haft-sin table.

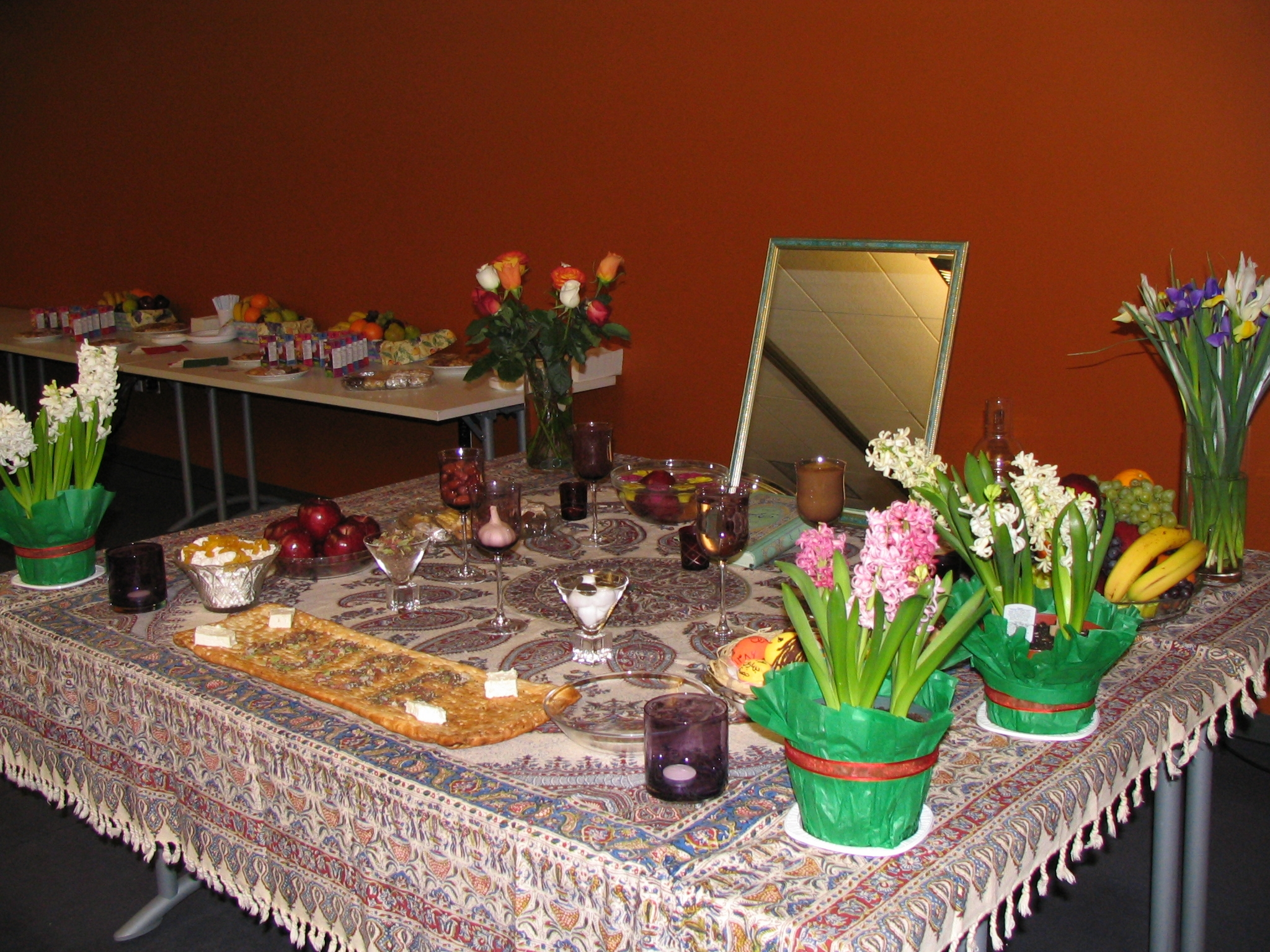
A Haft-sin table.

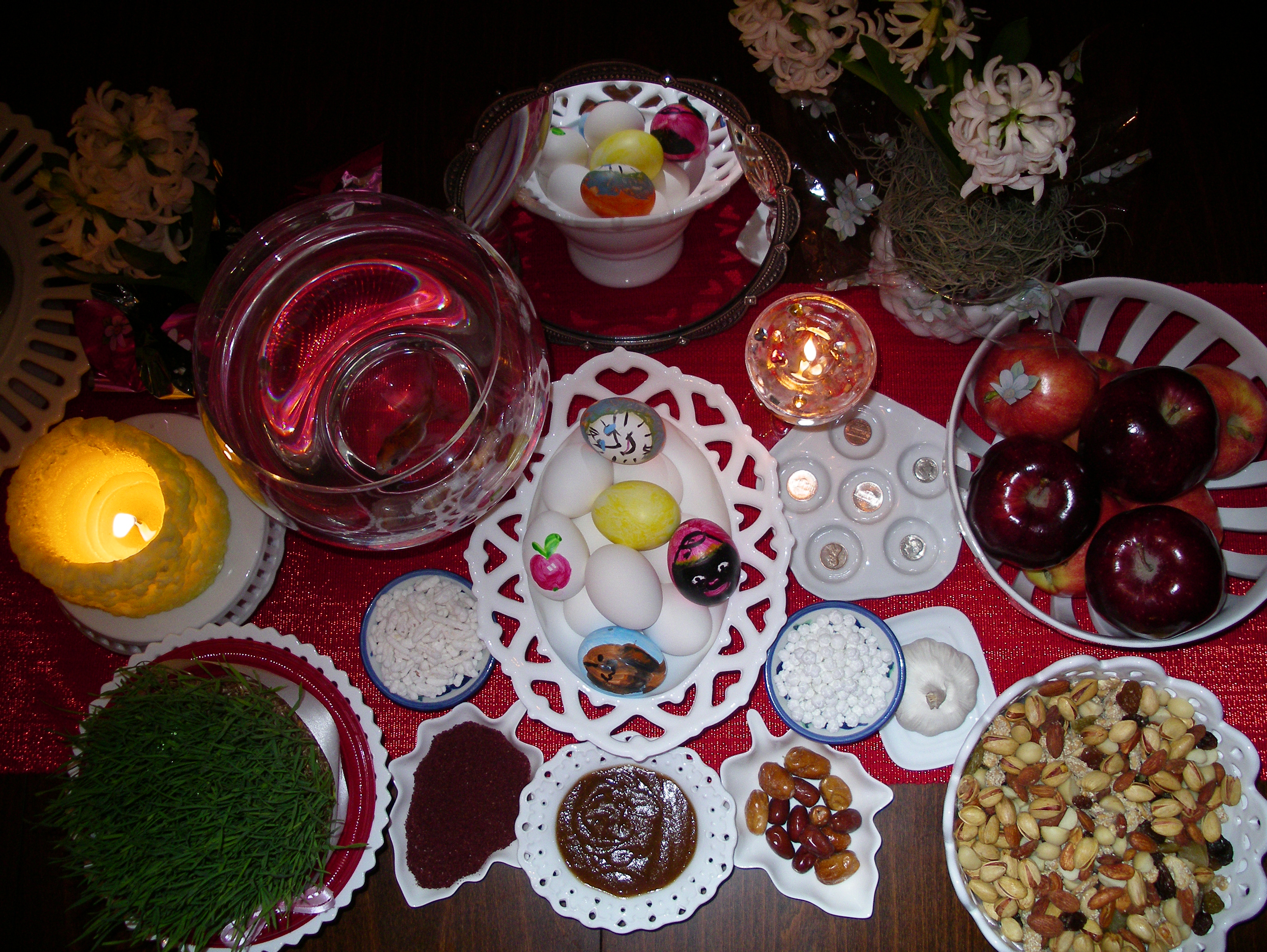
A Haft-sin table.

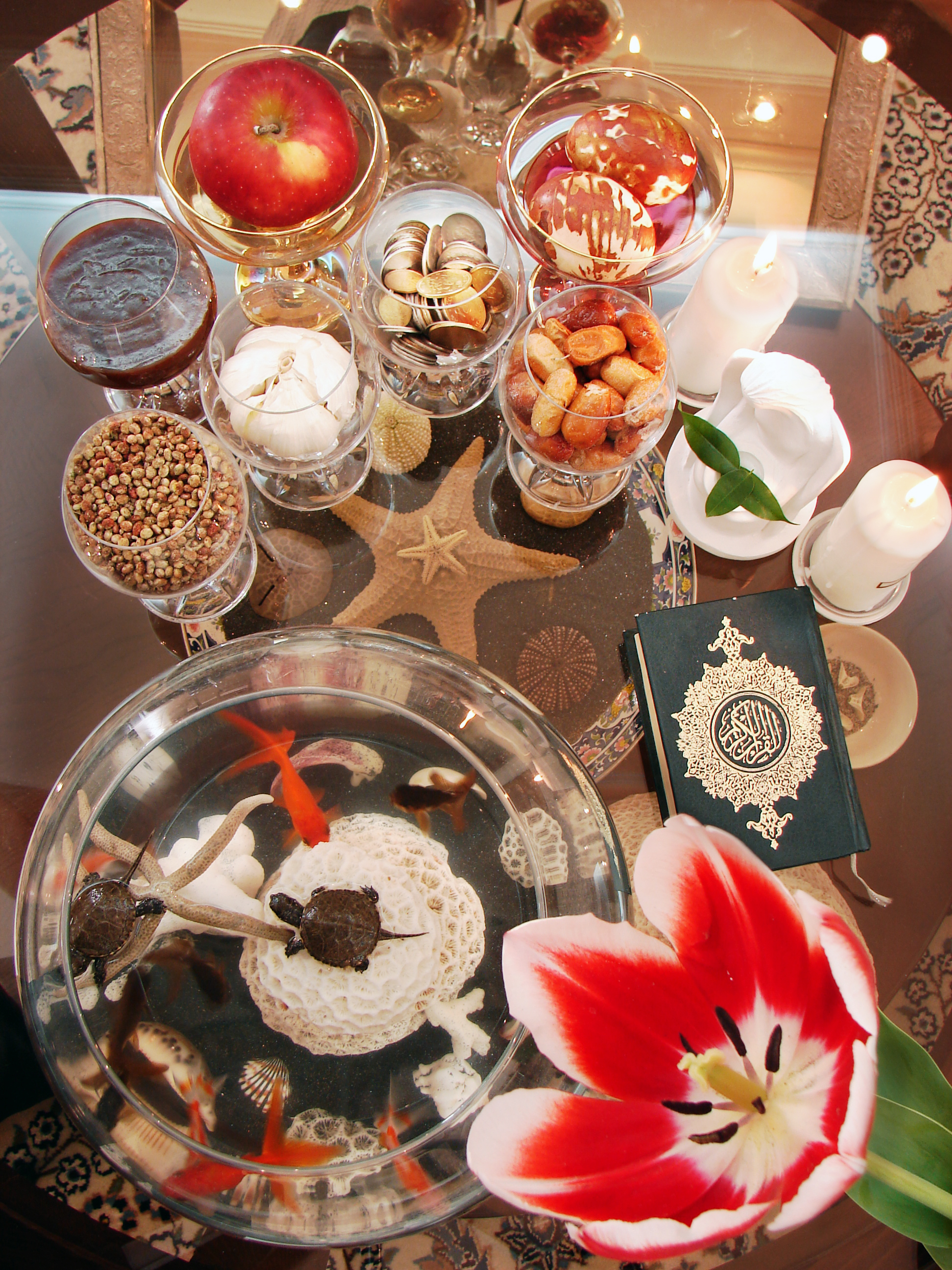
A Haft-sin table.

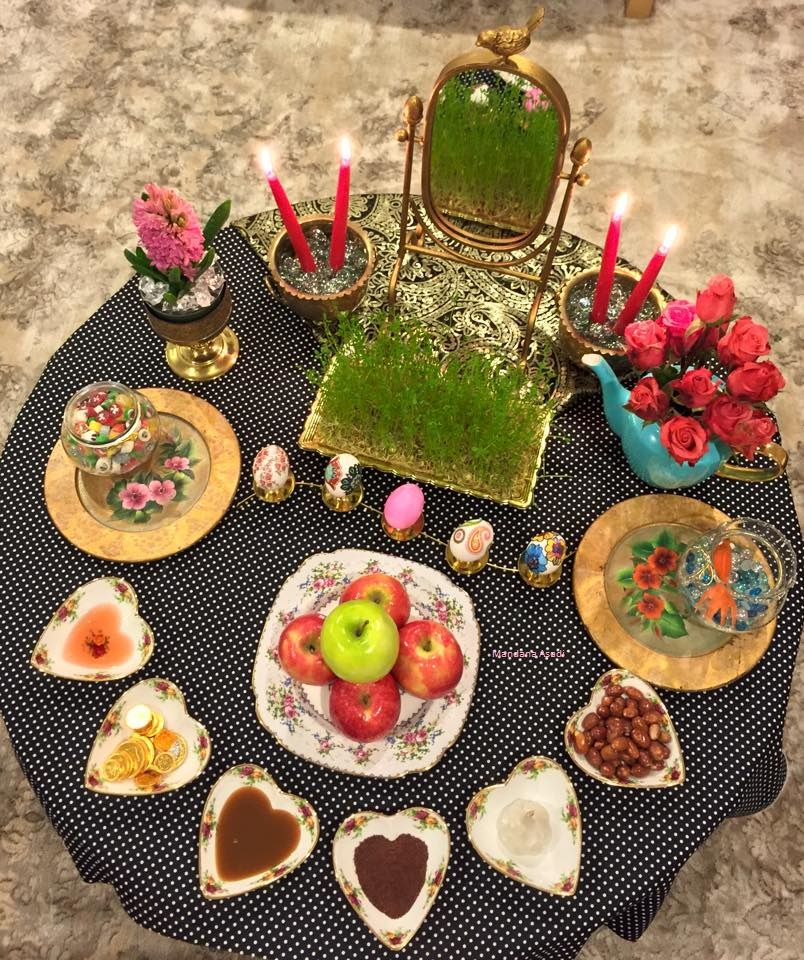
A Haft-sin table.

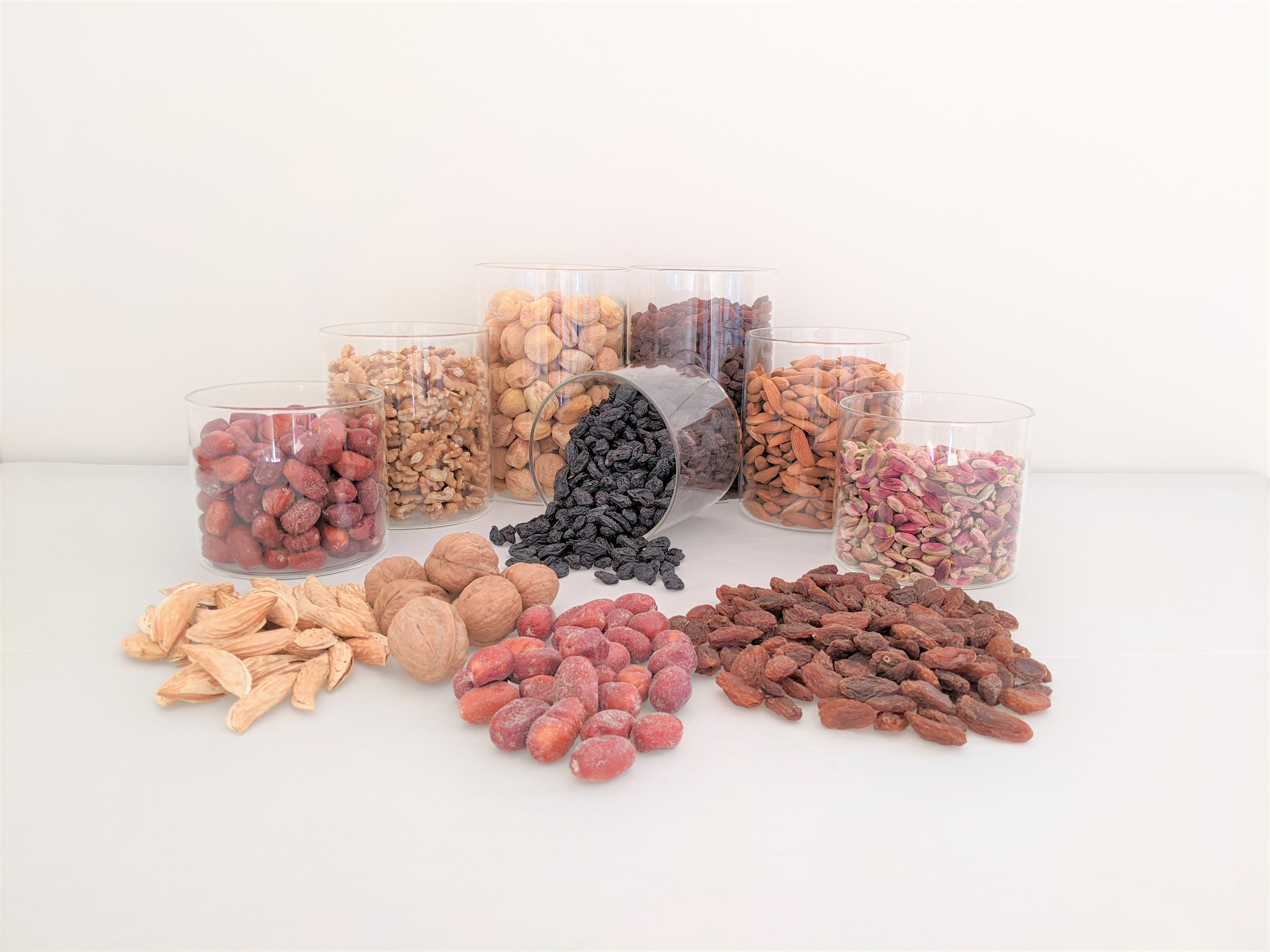
Haft Mewa

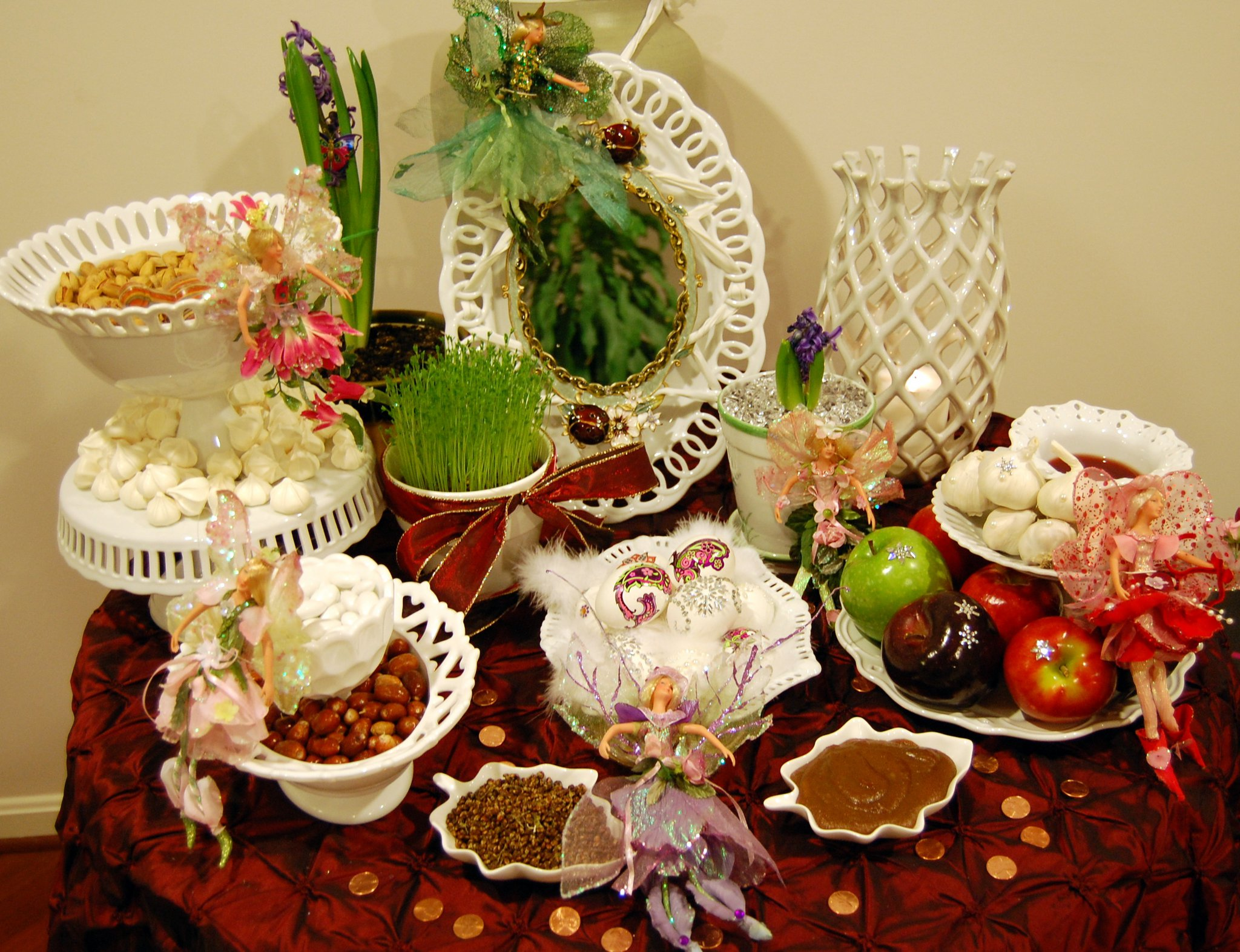
A Haft-sin table.

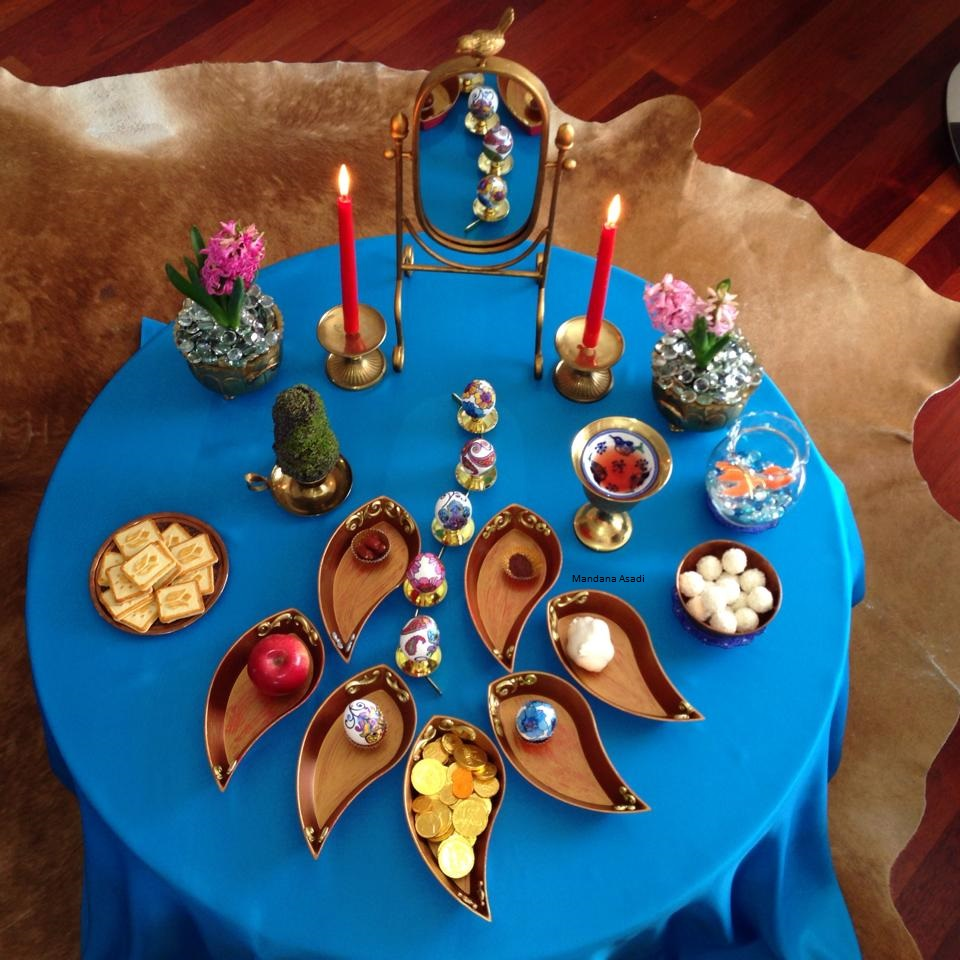
A Haft-sin table.

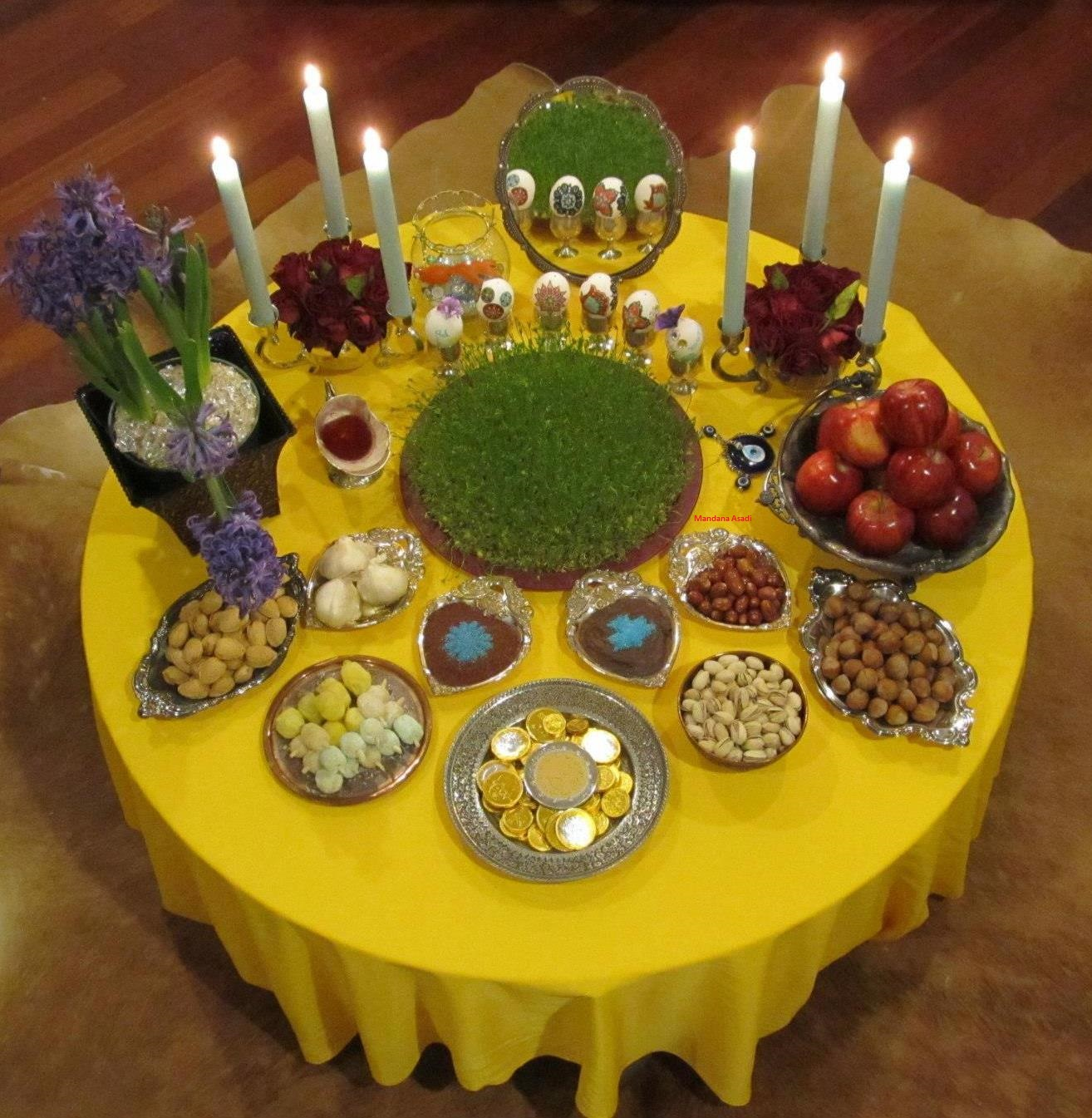
A Haft-sin table.

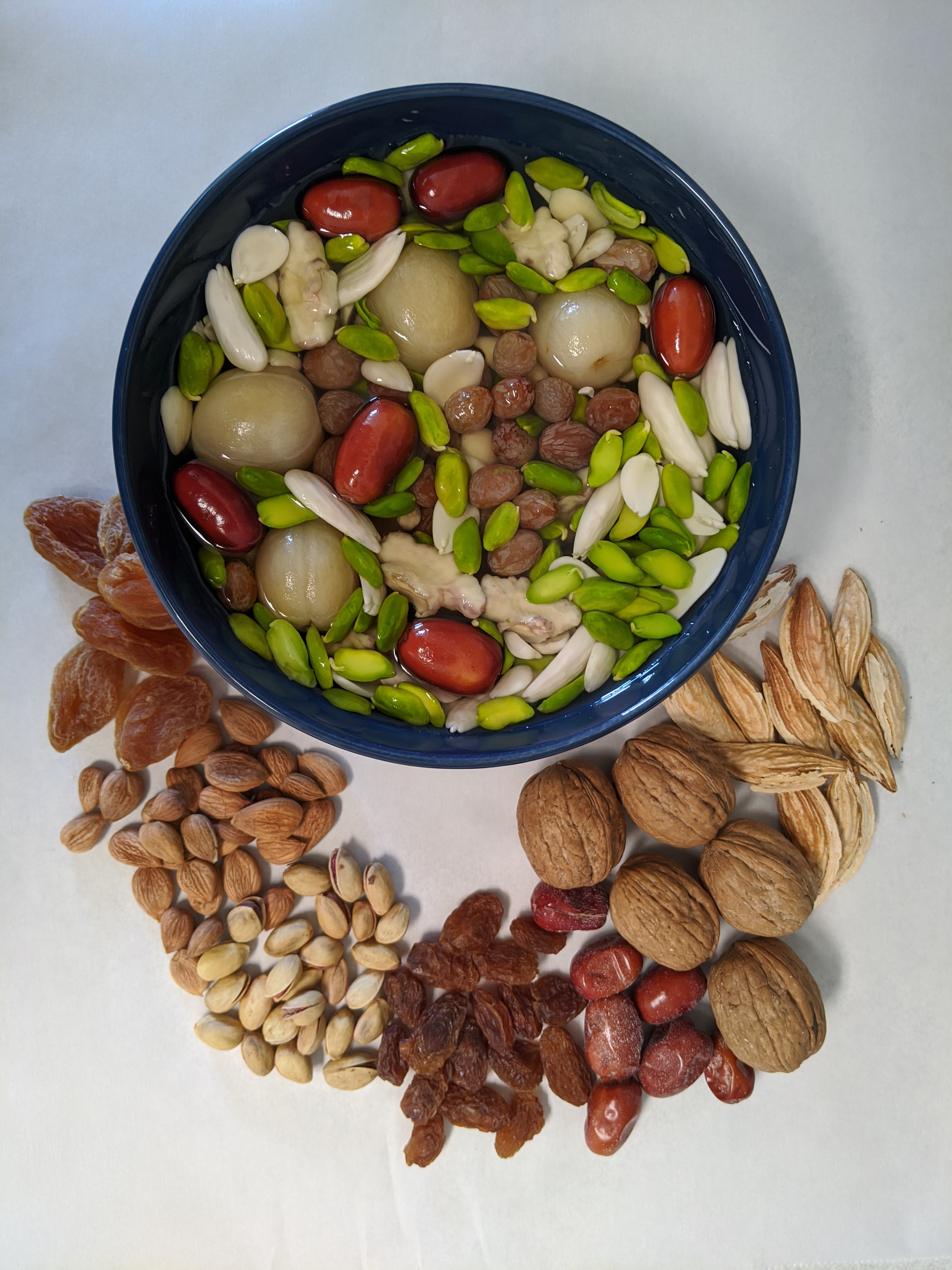
Haft Mewa

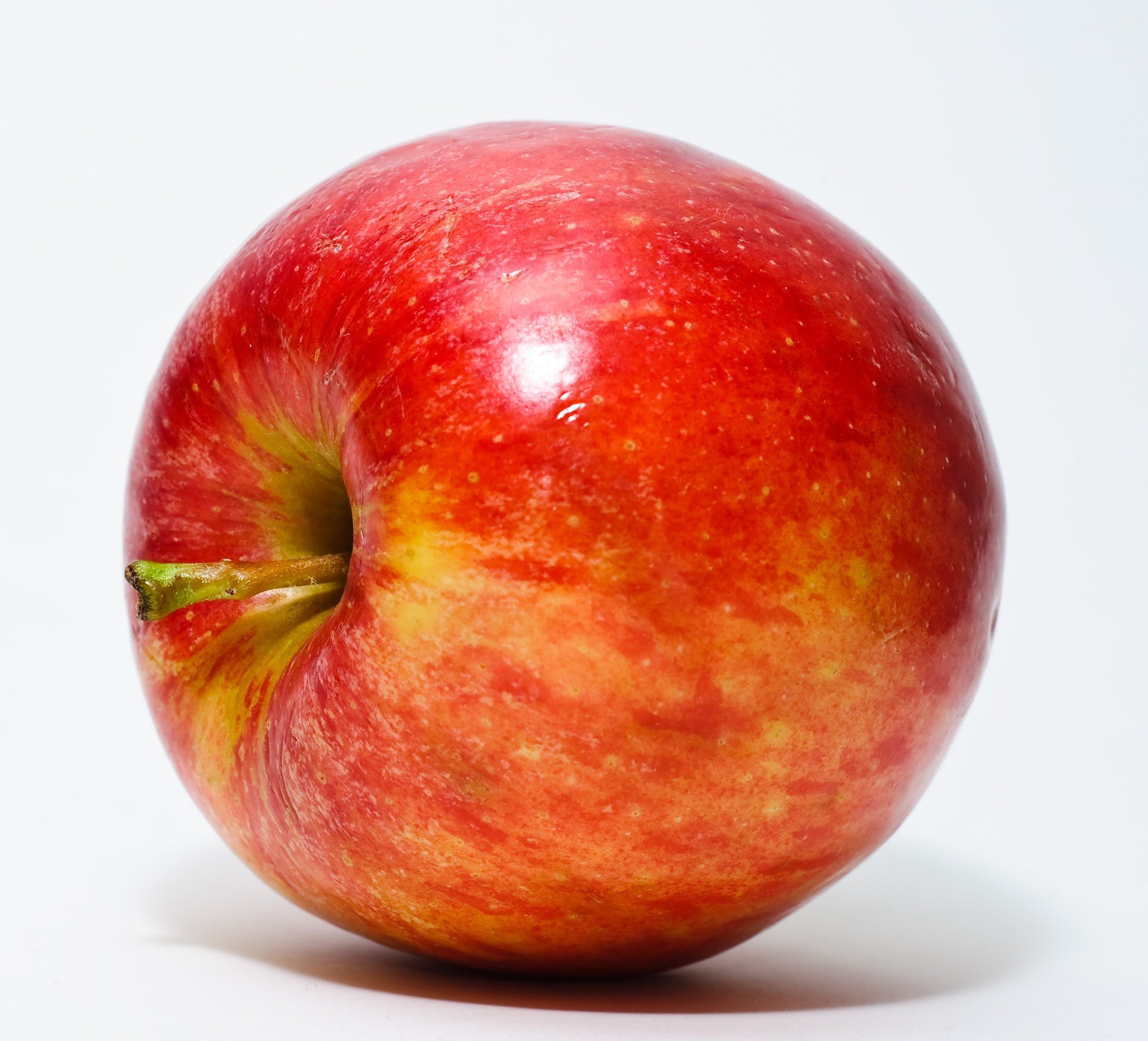
An apple, one of the items of Haft-sin.
