= Samanu =

Wheat dish from Iran and Central Asia

Samanu (sumalak)
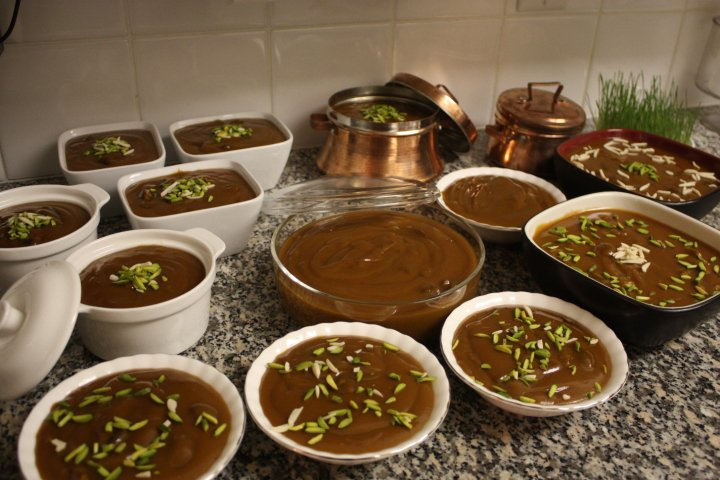
- Type: Dessert
- Place of origin: Greater Iran (Persia)
- Region or state: Iran, Afghanistan, Tajikistan, Azerbaijan, Turkmenistan, Uzbekistan, Kyrgyzstan, Kazakhstan
- Main ingredients: Germinated wheat
- Food energy (per serving): 300 kcal (1,300 kJ)

Culture of Sumanak/Sumalak cooking
- UNESCO Intangible Cultural Heritage
- Country: Tajikistan
- Reference: 02336
- Region: Asia and the Pacific

Inscription history
- Inscription: 2025 (20th session)
- List: Representative

Samanu (Persian: سمنو; Azerbaijani: səməni halvası), samanak (Persian: سمنک), sümelek (Kazakh: сүмелек; Turkmen: sümelek / syumelek), sumanak (Tajik: суманак), sumalak (Uzbek pronunciation: [sʉmælˈæk]), or sümölök (Kyrgyz: сүмөлөк [symœlˈœk]) is a sweet paste made from germinated wheat (young wheatgrass) and wheat flour, which is prepared especially for Nowruz (beginning of spring) in a large pot (like a kazan). This practice has been traced back to the pre-Islamic Sasanian Persian Empire. Although Samanu is prominent for "Haft-Sin" (the seven symbolic items traditionally displayed at Nowruz), the preparation "mela" (referring to a picnic) and eating it is traditional in Afghanistan.

To make samanu, wheat is soaked and prepared for days, with the entire process taking up to a week. Traditionally, the final cooking would take from evening until the daylight and was a party involving only women. This would be full of laughter and music, with the participants singing songs related to samanu making. In Iranian tradition the whole gathering, mostly women, gather near the huge pot. They sit in a circle, sing songs, and have fun, each of them waiting for her turn to stir the sumalak. While stirring the samanak, wishes can be made. Also, whole walnuts are thrown in near the end of the preparation while making a wish. In the morning, still-warm sumalak is handed out to neighbors, relatives, and friends. In Tajikistan and Afghanistan they sing: Samanak dar Jūsh u mā Kafcha zanēm – Dīgarān dar Khwāb u mā Dafcha zanēm. (meaning: "Samanak is boiling and we are stirring it, others are asleep and we are playing daf").

In modern times, making samanu can be a family activity. Traditional samanu is made entirely of germinated wheat and water, with no other ingredients. Nowadays, it is common to add a bit of flour to speed up the thickening process, although this makes the paste taste somewhat bitter and less sweet.

== Samanu trade ==
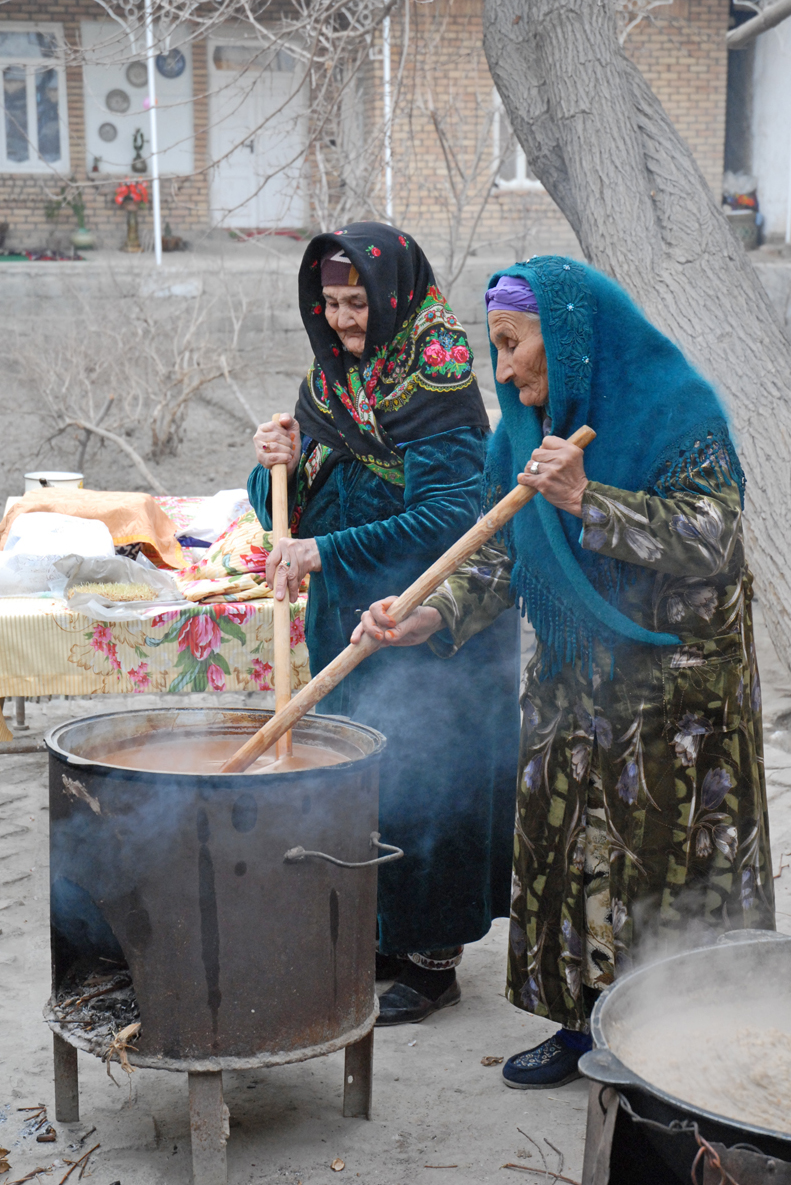
Sumalak preparation for Nowruz in Uzbekistan

Cooking samanu is a tradition and is practiced throughout the year, but it's production and trade is especially emphasized during the final weeks of year. this varies among local customs, but a major factor is that samanu is regarded as one of the key elements in a Haft-sin during Nowruz.

Among samanu-making centers, the Ashtian city, is known as city of samanu in Iran, due to the fact that samanu is produced as a local product all year long, for consumption in various occasions and customs, including parties, weddings and other customary ceremonies. in addition, samanu as a trading good, is exported to neighboring countries, and by extension nearby regions.

== Gallery ==
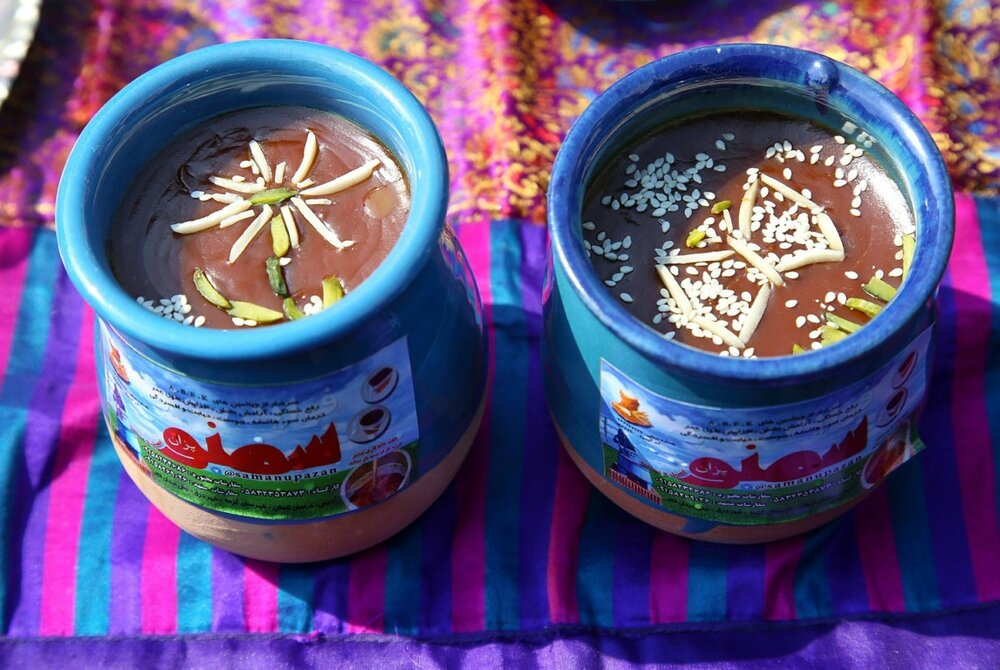
Samanu at the 6th Samanu Festival in Daragh, Iran

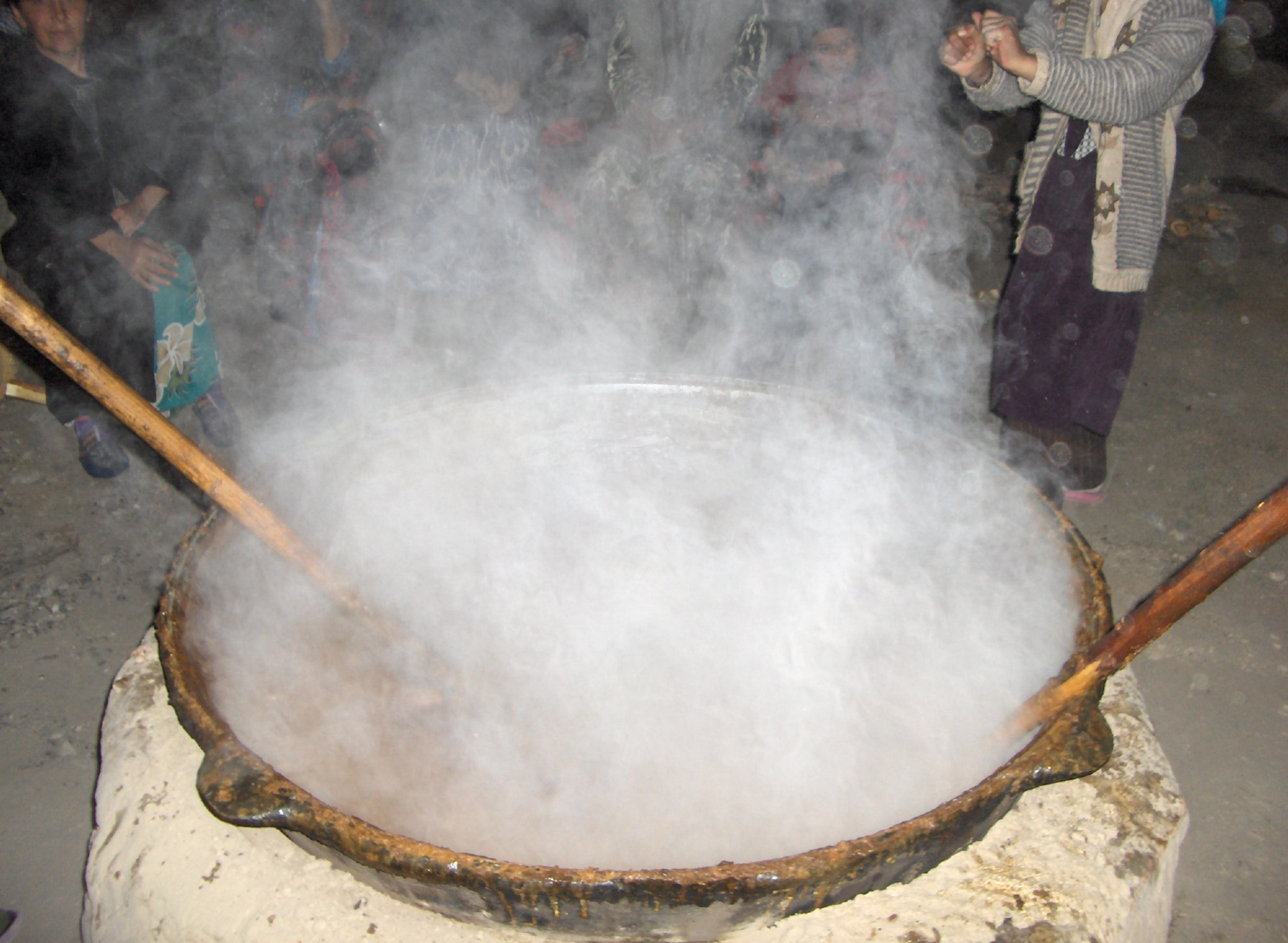
Cooking samanak in Isfara, Tajikistan

== See also ==
- Ashure, a Turkish wheat berry pudding
- Mämmi, a Finnish dessert made from water and partly malted rye, preparation taking several days to be ready for the spring festival Easter
