= Hajji Firuz =

Character in Iranian folklore who appears in the streets by the beginning of Nowruz

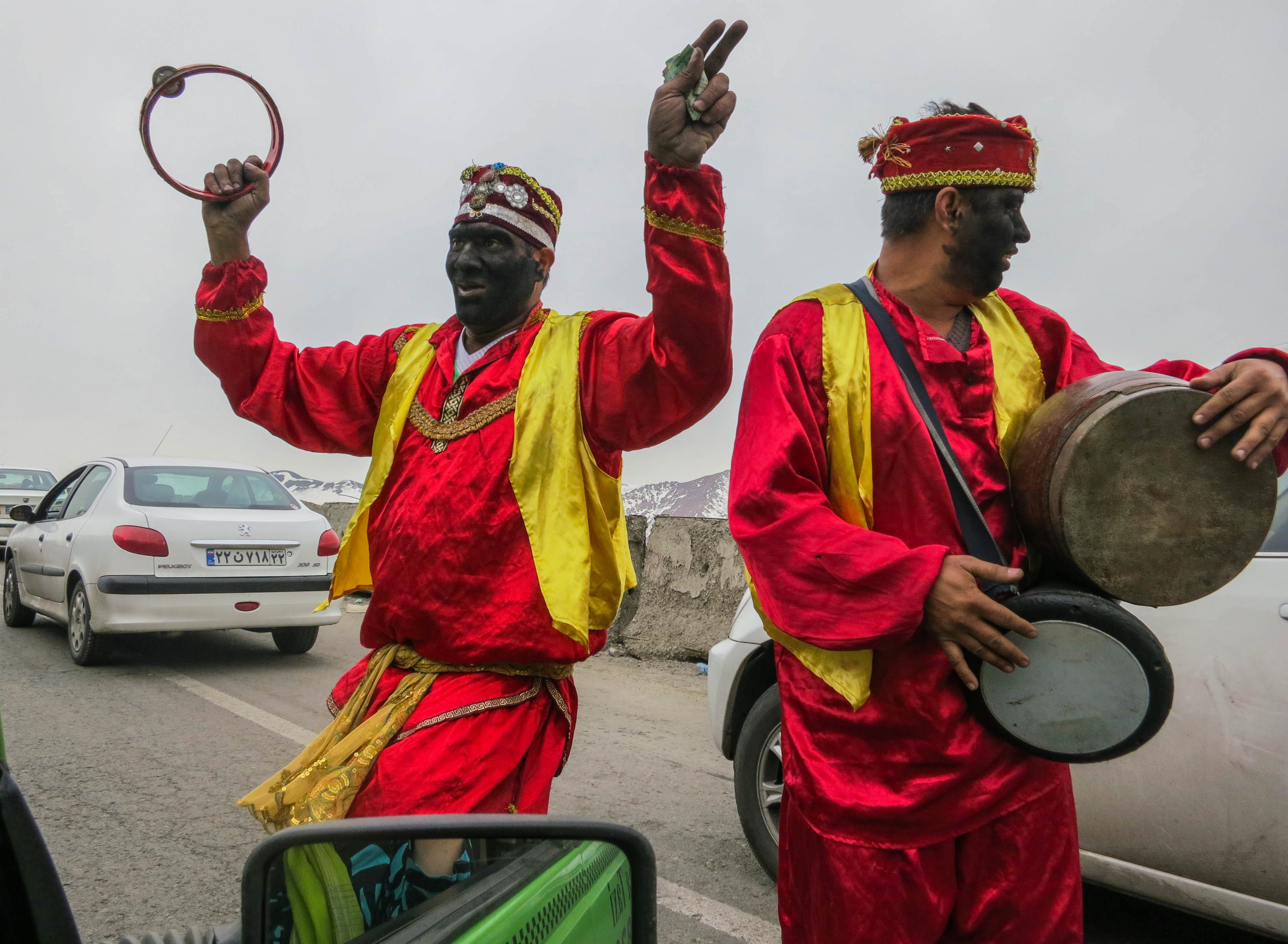
Hajji Firuz on the Chalous Road

Hāji Firuz (Persian: حاجی فیروز) or Khwāje Piruz (Persian: خواجه پیروز) is a fictional character in Iranian folklore who appears in the streets by the beginning of Nowruz. His face is covered in soot, and he is clad in bright red clothes and a felt hat. He dances through the streets while singing and playing a tambourine.

== Etymology ==
Haji, as written with the eighth letter of Perso-Arabic alphabet (حاجى), has a meaning unrelated to that of the word Hajji; it is a form of address, much like using sir to address a person in English, without the person being a knight. Firuz is the Arabized version of the Persian word piruz, meaning 'victor'.

Khaje Piruz is the other version of the term, which consists of the word khaje, identified as an Iranian title meaning 'master', and the non-Arabized piruz.

In the traditional songs, he introduces himself as a serf trying to cheer people whom he refers to as his lords.

The exact history of Hajji Firuz is unknown. According to some sources, Hajji Firuz is based on a tradition called Mir Nowruzi. Mir Nowruz was a comical figure chosen to rule the municipality for "the last five days of the year" (Panje). The temporary "five-day king" (Šāh e Panj Ruze) would often parade the city with a group of singers and dancers for the Nowruz celebrations.

Mehrdad Bahar, a prominent Persian historian, opined in 1983 that the figure of Hajji Firuz may be derived from ceremonies and legends connected to the epic of Prince Siavash, which are in turn derived from those associated with the Mesopotamian deity of agriculture and flocks, Tammuz (Sumerian Dumuzi). Later, it was claimed that the blackened face of Hajji Firuz symbolizes his returning from the world of the dead, his red clothing is the sign of the blood of Siavash and the coming to life of the sacrificed deity, while his joviality is the jubilation of rebirth, typical of those who bring rejuvenation and blessing along with themselves. Bahar speculates that the name Siyāwaxš might mean 'black man' or 'dark-faced man' and suggests that the term black in the name may be a reference either to the blackening of the faces of the participants in the aforementioned Mesopotamian ceremonies, or to the black masks that they wore for the festivities.

== Haji Firuz, siyah bazi and a practice of Iranian blackface ==
Since the 2010s, there has been increasing research challenging the myths of the origins of Haji Firuz and instead looking into its connection to the Indian Ocean and Persian Gulf slave trade realities as well as blackface practices. Scholars such as Dr Beeta Baghoolizadeh and Parisa Vaziri, each from the point of view of their respective discipline, history, and comparative literature, connect Haji Firuz with a legacy tied to the Indian Ocean and Persian gulf slave trade as well as practices known as siyah-bazi, (meaning black play in Persian), for blackface performance. The work of the Collective for black Iranians has also consistently produced on the harms of Haji Firuz and blackface performances, with a call to end blackface performances in the Iranian community, mostly from black Iranians.

== Typical songs ==
=== Hājji Firouz E! ===
حاجی فیروزه، سالی یک روزه،
همه می دونن، منم می دونم،
عیدِ نوروزه، سالی یه روزه.

Hājji firuz e, sāl-i ye ruz e (It’s Hajji Firuz, it’s only one day a year)

Hame midunan, man am midunam (Everyone knows, I know as well)

Eyd e Nowruz e, sāl-i ye ruz e (It's Nowruz, it’s only one day a year)

=== Arbāb e Xod am ===
ارباب خودم، «سلامُ علیکم» !
ارباب خودم، سرِتو بالا کن!
ارباب خودم، لطفی به ما کن،
ارباب خودم، به من نگاه کن!
ارباب خودم، بزبز قندی،
ارباب خودم، چرا نمی خندی؟

Arbāb e xod am, "sāmmule baleykom" (Greetings, my lord)

Arbāb e xod am, sar et-o bālā kon (Raise your head, my lord)

Arbāb e xod am, lotf-i be mā kon (Do me a favor, my lord)

Arbāb e xod am, be man nigā kon (Look at me, my lord)

Arbāb e xod am, boz-boz e qandi (My lord, the billy goat)

Arbāb e xod am, čerā nemi-xandi? (Why don’t you smile, my lord?)

=== Beškan Beškan ===
بشکن بشکنه؛ بشکن!
من نمی شکنم؛ بشکن!
اینجا بشکنم، یار گله داره،
اونجا بشکنم، یار گله داره؛
هر جا بشکنم یار گله داره این سیاه بیچاره چقدر حوصله داره!

Beškan beškan e, beškan! (It's a snap-snap, snap!)

Man nemi-škanam, beškan! (I won't snap, snap!)

Injā beškanam, yār gele dāre (If I snap here, this one will complain)

Unjā beškanam, yār gele dāre (If I snap there, that one will complain)

In siāh e bičāre če qad howsele dāre! (How patient this poor black [man] is!)

== See also ==
- Amu Nowruz – Character from Iranian folklore
- Balthazar (magus) – King of Arabia and youngest of three Magi who visited Jesus, depicted as a young black man, sometimes impersonated by a white man in blackface
- Border Morris – Collection of individual local dances from Herefordshire, Worcestershire and Shropshire
- Knecht Ruprecht – Companion of Saint Nicholas in Germanic folklore
- Olentzero – Character in Basque Christmas tradition, depicted sometimes as a dirty charcoal maker
- Siuda Baba – Old Polish folk custom, celebrated on Easter Monday
- Tattamangalam Kuthira Vela – Full-black body paint festival in Kerala, India
- Zwarte Piet – Saint Nicholas companion in Low Countries folklore

== Bibliography ==
- Richardson, John. Wilkens, Charles, ed. (1810). A Vocabulary, Persian, Arabic, and English: Abridged.... London: F. & C. Rivingson. [OCLC: 5631372]
- Ghanoonparvar, M.R. (1993). In a Persian Mirror: Images of the West and Westerners in Contemporary Iranian Fiction. University of Texas Press. LCCN 92039689.
