= Yılgayakh =

Spring festival of Tengrism

Yılgayakh (Turkish: Yılgayak or İlkyaz; means "Year-Passing") or Ulugh-Kun ("Great Day" in Old and Middle Turkic) was the spring festival of Tengrism. It was celebrated on or about March 22, and marked the first day of the Turkic month of Oshlaq-ay. The holiday was celebrated with feasting and probably with sacrificial rites. The name of the holiday appears in the medieval dictionary Divan-i Lughat-it-Turk by Mahmud Kashgari, written in the 1070s.

== Sleep of Universe ==
Yılgayah is a traditional Turkic holiday, which celebrates the New Year, and the coming of Spring. That night, at that moment everything sleeps for an instant. Back then wakes up the universe.

Yılgayah is a family holiday. In the evening before the holiday the whole family gathers around the holiday table laid with various dishes to make the New Year rich. The holiday goes on for several days and ends festive public dancing and other entertainment of folk bands, contests of national sports.

== See also ==
- Nowruz

== Bibliography ==
- Kevin Alan Brook, Kevin Alan, The Jews of Khazaria. 2nd ed. Rowman & Littlefield Publishers, Inc, 2006.
