= Oshlaq-ay =

Month in shamanic calendar of Eurasian nomadic peoples

Oshlaq-ay was a month in the shamanic calendar of Eurasian nomadic peoples, particularly among the Turkic peoples. It began around 21 March, coinciding with the celebration of Ulugh Kun.
