= Nane Sarma =

Mythical character in Iranian folklore

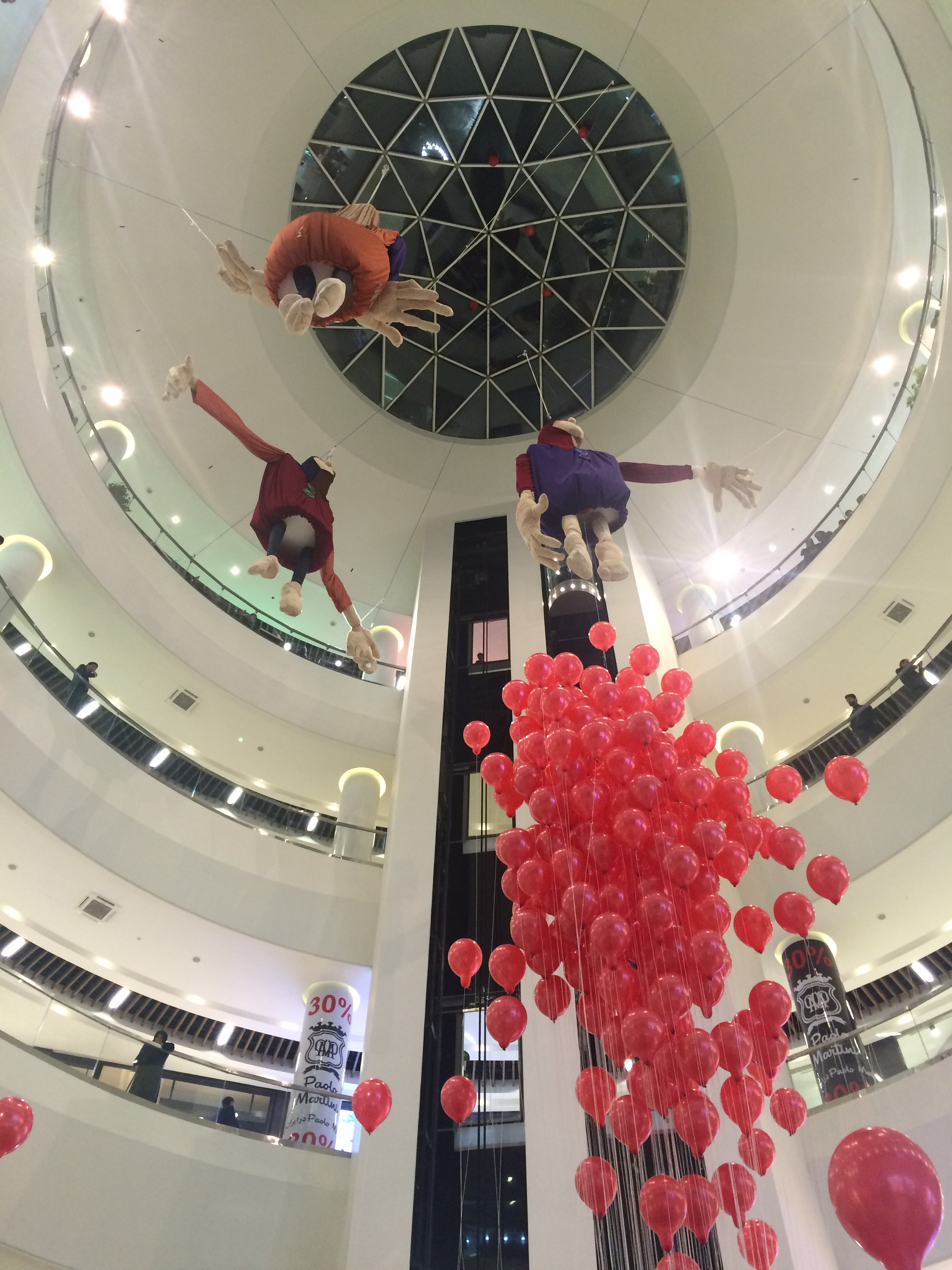
Yalda celebrations, 2015 - Arg mall, Tajrish, Tehran, Iran. Nane Sarma's large puppet is hung from above along with other Iranian characters

Nane Sarma (Persian: ننه سرما, "Grandma Frost"), also known as Bibi Barfi (Persian: بی‌بی برفی, "Grandma Snow"), is a mythical character in Iranian folklore. She is the wife of Amu Nowruz, the "Uncle Nowruz".

In 2012, the first Iranian folktale of Nane Sarma was published in English, in the book Pomegranates and Roses: A Persian Love Story.

== See also ==
- Snegurochka, a related character in Slavic countries, except that she is depicted as the granddaughter of Grandfather Frost, the local holiday gift-bringer.
- Deities and personifications of seasons
