= Nowruz =

New Year's Day on the Iranian calendars

Nowruz نوروز (Persian)
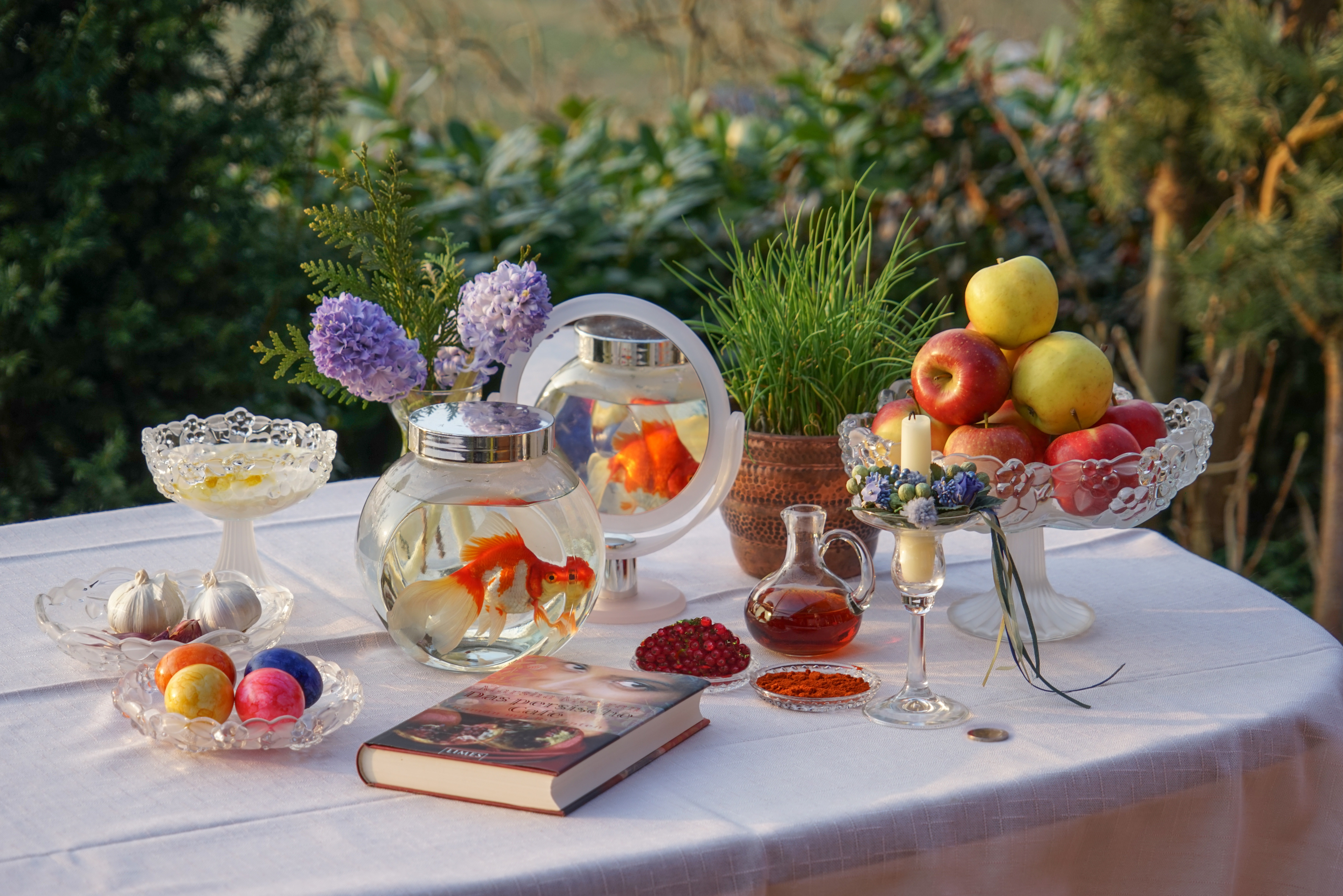
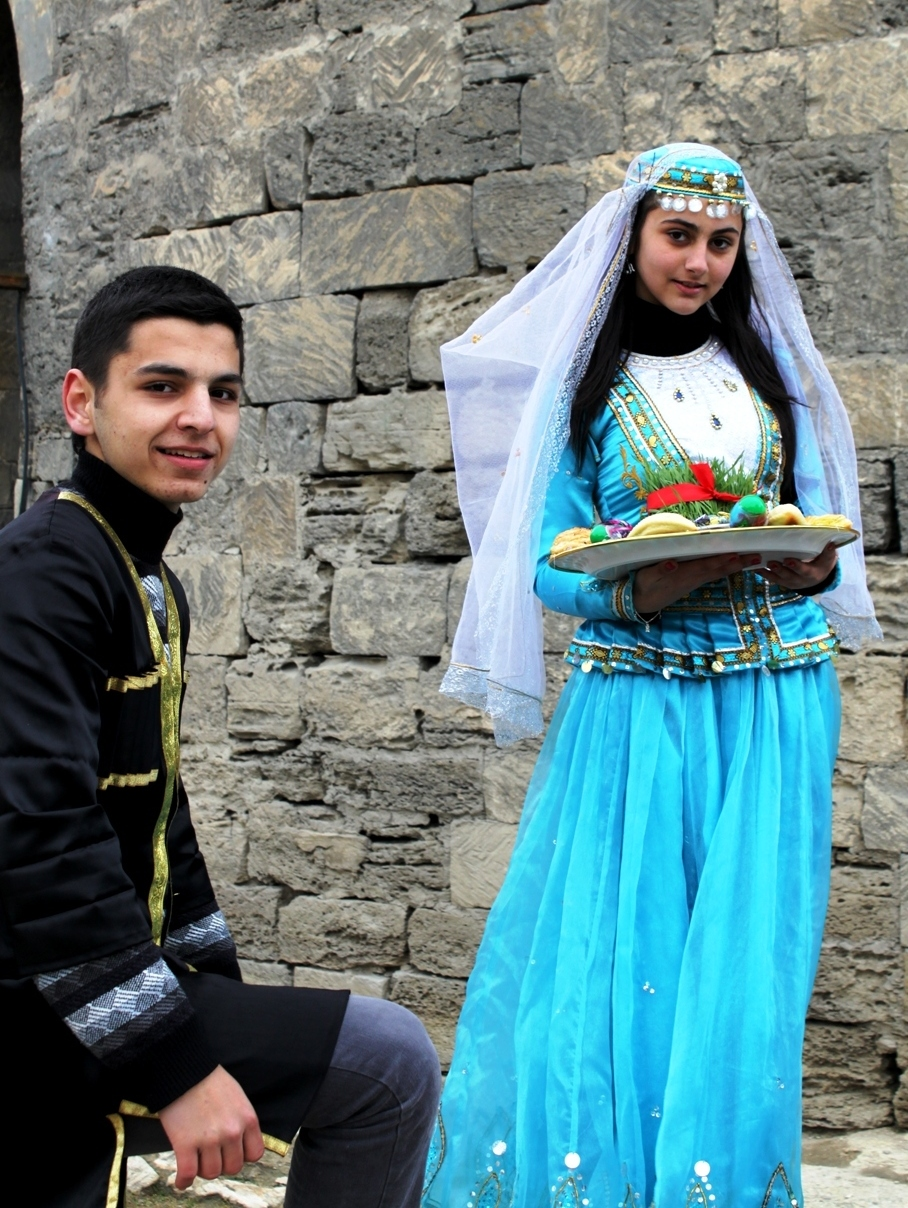
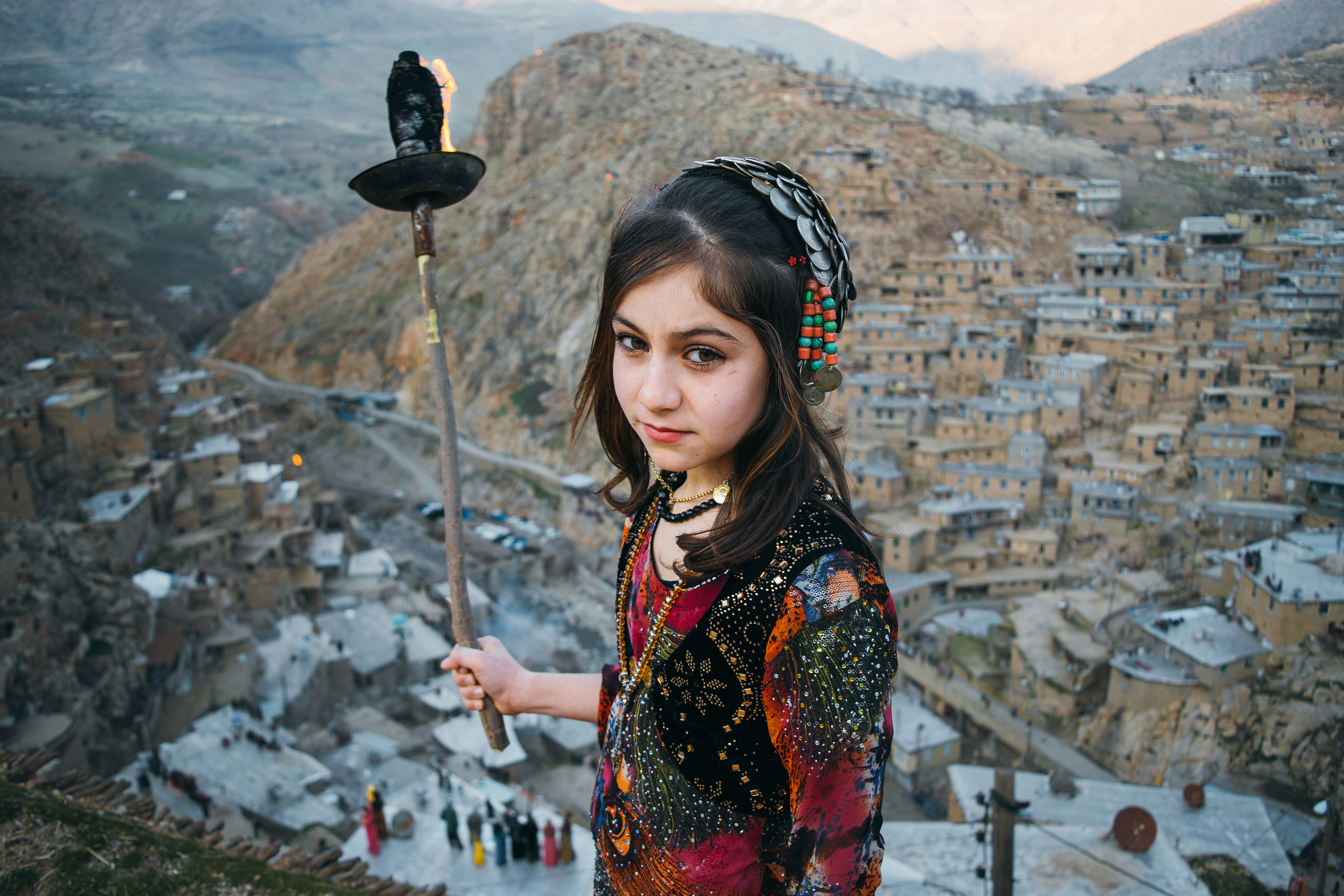
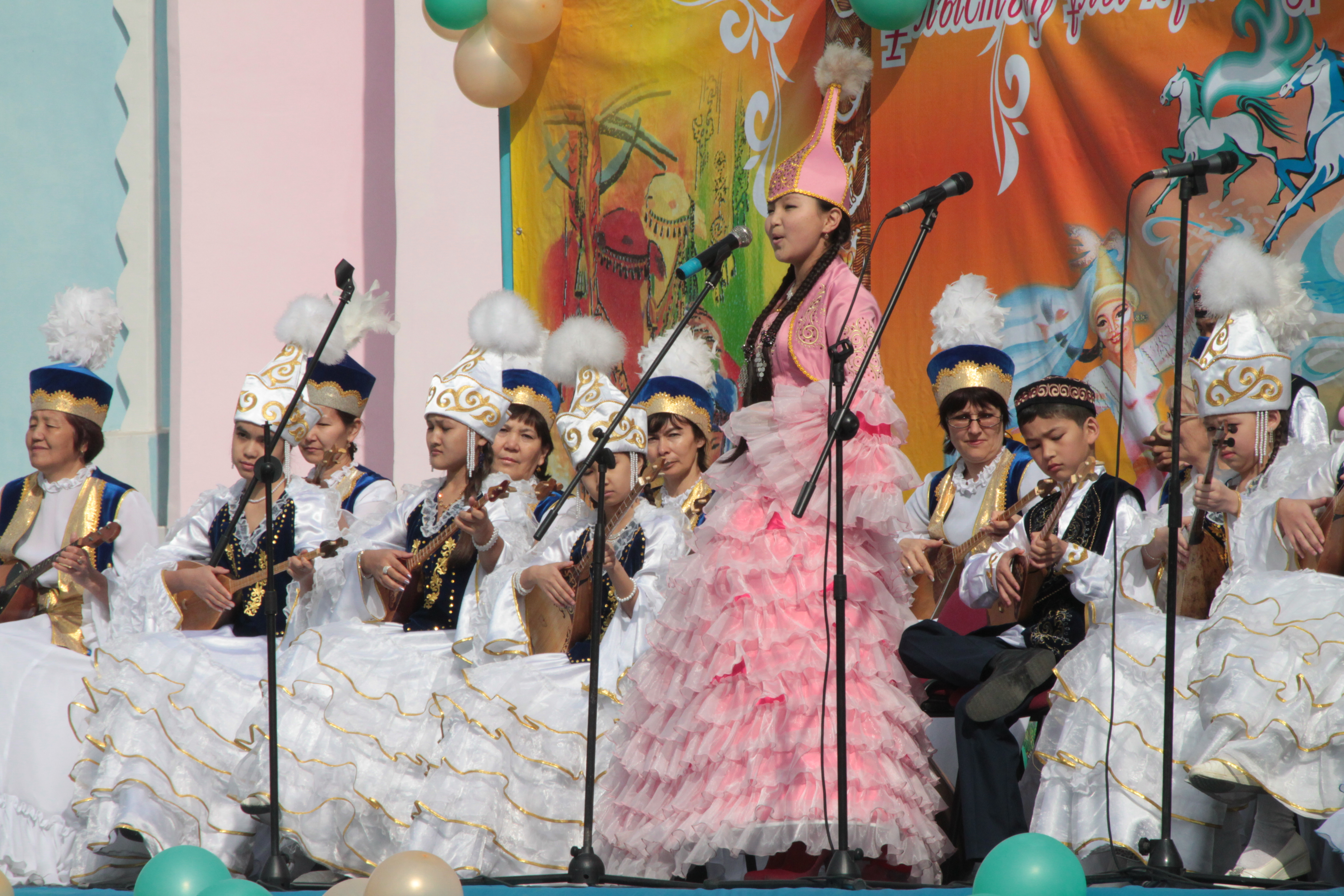
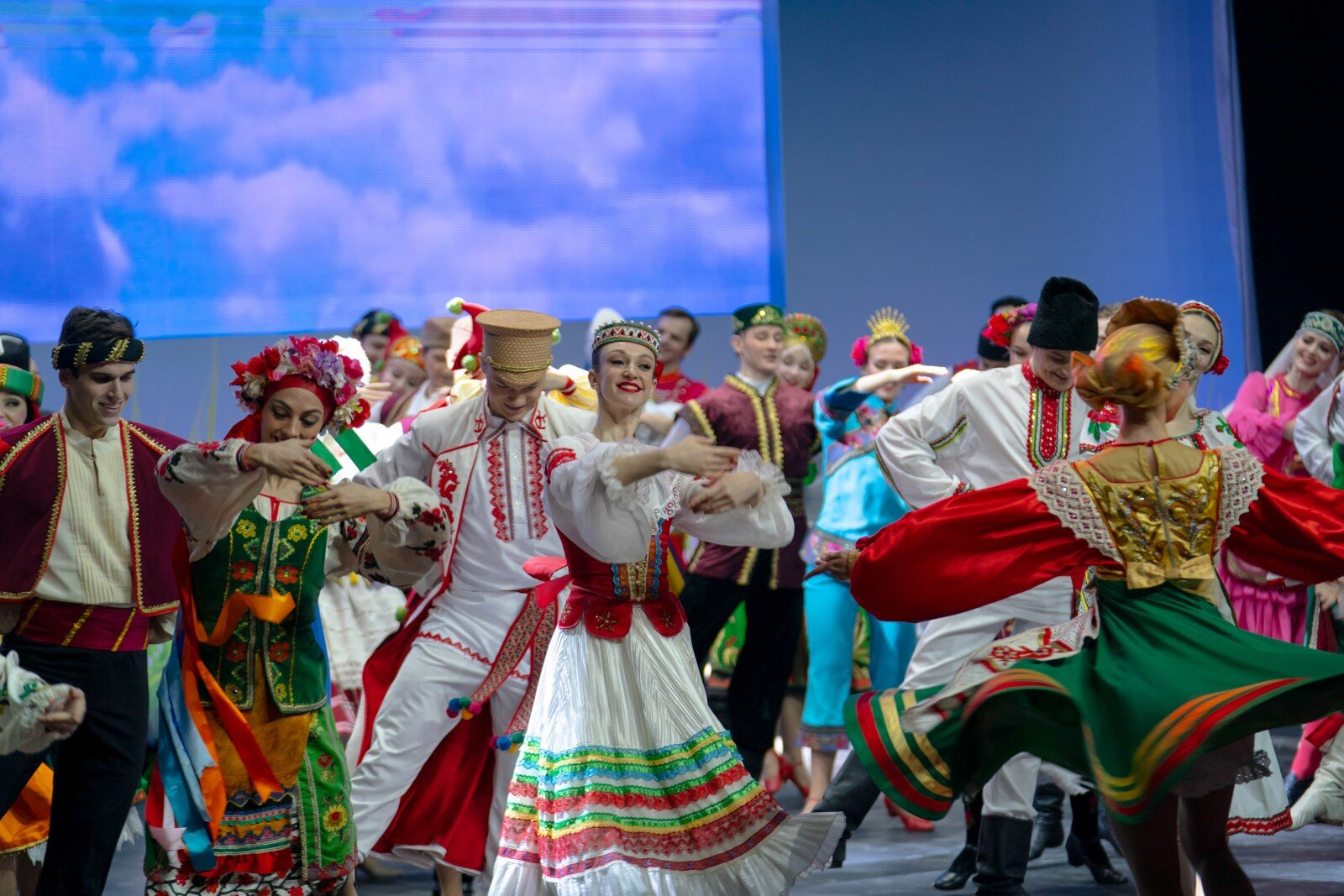
- A Haft-Sin arrangement, traditionally displayed for Nowruz. Azerbaijanis in traditional Nowruz outfits Kurdish girl in Palangan, Iran, during Nowruz festival preparations Kazakhs in traditional outfits during a Nowruz musical performance Citizens from the Commonwealth of Independent States dancing in Moscow, Russia, for Nowruz festivities
- Observed by: Iranian peoples and diaspora (originally); Various ethnic groups from Persianate societies (currently) Current countries: Afghanistan; Albania; Armenia (Note: By Iranian Armenians, Kurds, and Yazidis.); Australia (Note: By Iranian Australians, Afghans, and others.); Azerbaijan; Bahrain (Note: By the Ajam (Iranians).); Bangladesh; Canada (Note: By Iranian Canadians and Turkic peoples.); China (Note: By Xinjiang Tajiks and Turkic peoples.); Cyprus; France (Note: By French Iranians and others.); Georgia (Note: By Azerbaijanis.); Germany (Note: By German Afghans, Iranians, and others.); India (Note: By Parsis, Iranis, Kashmiris, Deccanis, and many Shia Muslims.); Iran; Iraq (Note: By Kurds and Turkmen.); Israel (Note: By Baháʼís and some Iranian Jews.); Kazakhstan; Kosovo; Kyrgyzstan; Netherlands (Note: By Dutch Afghans, Dutch Iranians and others.); New Zealand (Note: By Afghan New Zealanders, Iranian New Zealanders, and others.); North Macedonia; Norway (Note: By Norwegian Iranians and others.); Mongolia (Note: By Bayan-Ölgii Kazakhs.); Oman; Pakistan (Note: By Baloch, Baltis, Parsis, Iranis, Pashtuns, Wakhis, and some Shia Muslims.); Russia (Note: By Tatars, Bashkirs, Tabasarans, and others.); Sweden (Note: By Swedish Iranians and Kurds.); Syria (Note: By Kurds.); Tajikistan; Turkey (Note: By Azerbaijanis, Kurds, and Yörüks.); Turkmenistan; Ukraine (Note: By Crimean Tatars.); United Kingdom (Note: By British Azerbaijanis, British Iranians, and others.); United States (Note: By Afghan Americans, Azerbaijanis, Iranians, Kurds, and others.); Uzbekistan
- Type: Cultural
- Significance: Vernal equinox; first day of a new year on the Iranian calendars and the Solar Hijri calendar
- Date: Between 19 and 22 March
- 2025 date: 09:01:30, 20 March (UTC)
- 2026 date: 14:45:59, 20 March (UTC)
- 2027 date: 20:24:18, 20 March (UTC)
- Frequency: Annual
- Related to: Chaharshanbe Suri, Sizdebedar

Nawrouz, Novruz, Nowrouz, Nowrouz, Nawrouz, Nauryz, Nooruz, Nowruz, Navruz, Nevruz, Nowruz, Navruz
- UNESCO Intangible Cultural Heritage
- Country: Afghanistan, Azerbaijan, India, Iran, Iraq, Kazakhstan, Kyrgyzstan, Mongolia, Pakistan, Tajikistan, Turkey, Turkmenistan, and Uzbekistan
- Reference: 02097
- Region: Asia and the Pacific

Inscription history
- Inscription: 2016 (4th session)
- List: Representative

Nowruz (Persian: نوروز, Iranian Persian: [noːˈɾuːz], (Note: Classical Persian: نوروز (Nawrōz); Afghan Persian (Dari): نوروز (Nawrōz, pronounced [nawˈɾoːz]); Tajik Persian: Наврӯз (Navrūz, pronounced [næʋˈɾɵz]); Other languages: Arabic: نوروز (Nawrūz); Armenian: Նովրուզ (Novruz); Azerbaijani: Новруз (Novruz); Bengali: নওরোজ (Nôōrōj); Chinese: 諾魯孜節 (Nuòlǔ zījié); Gujarati: નવરોઝ (Navarōjha); Georgian: ნოვრუზ (Novruz); Hebrew: נורוז (Noroz); Hindi: नौरोज़ (Nauroz); Kazakh: Наурыз (Nauryz); Kurdish: نەورۆز (Newroz); Kyrgyz: Нооруз (Nooruz); Mongolian: Наурыз (Nauryz); Pashto: نوی ورز (Nəway wrəz); Turkish: Nevruz; Tatar: Нәүрүз (Nəwrüz); Turkmen: Новруз (Nowruz); Urdu: نوروز (Nauroz); Uyghur: نەۋروز (Noruz); Uzbek: Наврўз (Navroʻz)) lit. 'New Day') is New Year's Day on the Iranian calendars, including the currently used Solar Hijri calendar. Historically, it has been observed by Iranian peoples, but is now celebrated by many Persianate cultures worldwide. It is a festival based on the Northern Hemisphere spring equinox, and thus usually coincides with a date between 19 March and 22 March on the Gregorian calendar.

The roots of Nowruz lie in Zoroastrianism, and it has been celebrated by many peoples across West Asia, Central Asia, the Caucasus and the Black Sea Basin, the Balkans, and South Asia for over 3,000 years. In the modern era, while it is observed as a secular holiday by most celebrants, Nowruz remains a holy day for Zoroastrians, Baháʼís, and Ismaili Shia Muslims.

For the Northern Hemisphere, Nowruz marks the beginning of the spring season. Customs for the festival include various fire and water rituals, celebratory dances, gift exchanges, and poetry recitations, among others; these observances differ between the cultures of the diverse communities that celebrate it.

== Overview ==
The first day of the Iranian calendar falls on the March equinox, the first day of spring, around 21 March. In the 11th century AD the Iranian calendar was reformed by Omar Khayyam to fix the beginning of the calendar year, i.e., Nowruz, at the vernal equinox. Accordingly, the definition of Nowruz given by the Iranian astronomer Tusi was the following: "the first day of the official New Year [Nowruz] was always the day on which the sun entered Aries before noon." Nowruz is the first day of Farvardin, the first month of the Solar Hijri calendar, which is the official calendar in use in Iran, and formerly in Afghanistan.

The United Nations officially recognized the "International Day of Nowruz" with the adoption of Resolution 64/253 by the United Nations General Assembly in February 2010.

=== Etymology ===
The word Nowruz is a combination of the Persian words نو (now, meaning 'new') and روز (ruz, 'day'). Historically, the word was vocalized in Classical Persian as Nawrōz, and in Middle Persian as Nōgrōz. The modern pronunciation varies among Persian dialects, with Dari and Tajiki (the eastern dialects) using the pronunciations [nawˈɾoːz] and [næʋˈɾɵz] respectively, and Iranian Persian (the western dialect) using [nowˈɾuːz] (in particular in the Tehrani accent: [noːˈɾuːz]). A variety of spellings for the word Nowruz exist in English-language usage, including Norooz, Novruz, Nowruz, Navruz, Nauruz and Newroz.

=== Spring equinox calculation ===
Illumination of Earth by the Sun on the day of the equinox.

Nowruz's timing is based on the vernal equinox of the Northern Hemisphere. In Iran, it is the first day of the new year in the Solar Hijri algorithmic calendar, which is based on precise astronomical observations, and the sophisticated intercalation system, which makes it more accurate than its European counterpart, the Gregorian calendar.

The day of Nowruz begins on the midnight in the interval between the two consecutive solar noons that includes the instant of the March equinox. (If the exact moment of astronomical equinox occurs before noon (Tehran time), that day is considered Nowruz and the first day of Farvardin. If the equinox occurs after noon, the following day is designated as Nowruz.) Hence, the first mid-day is on the last day of one calendar year, and the second mid-day is on the first day (Nowruz) of the next year.

Each 2820-year great grand cycle contains 2,137 normal years of 365 days and 683 leap years of 366 days, with the average year length over the great grand cycle 365.24219852. This average is just 0.00000026 (2.6×10^{−7}) of a day—slightly more than 1/50 of a second—shorter than Newcomb's value for the mean tropical year of 365.24219878 days, but differs considerably more from the current average vernal equinox year of 365.242362 days, which means that the new year, intended to fall on the vernal equinox, would drift by half a day over the course of a cycle. (Note: As the source explains, the 2820-year cycle is erroneous and has never been used in practice.)

=== Chaharshanbe Suri ===
Chaharshanbe Suri (Persian: چهارشنبه‌سوری, romanized: čahâr-šanbeh suri, lit. 'Festive Wednesday') is a prelude to the New Year. In Iran, it is celebrated on the eve of the last Wednesday before Nowruz. It is usually celebrated in the evening by performing rituals such as jumping over bonfires and lighting off firecrackers and fireworks.

In Azerbaijan, where the preparation for Novruz usually begins a month earlier, the festival is held every Tuesday during four weeks before the holiday of Novruz. Each Tuesday, people celebrate the day of one of the four elements—water, fire, earth and wind. On the holiday eve, the graves of relatives are visited and tended.

Iranians sing the poetic line "my yellow is yours, your red is mine", which means "my weakness to you and your strength to me" (Persian: سرخی تو از من، زردی من از تو, romanized: sorkhi-ye to az man, zardi-ye man az to) to the fire during the festival, asking the fire to take away ill-health and problems and replace them with warmth, health, and energy. Trail mix and berries are also served during the celebration.

Spoon banging (قاشق زنی, qāšoq zani) is a tradition observed on the eve of Charshanbe Suri, similar to the Halloween custom of trick-or-treating. In Iran, people wear disguises and go door-to-door banging spoons against plates or bowls and receive packaged snacks. In Azerbaijan, children slip around to their neighbors' homes and apartments on the last Tuesday prior to Novruz, knock at the doors, and leave their caps or little basket on the thresholds, hiding nearby to wait for candies, pastries and nuts.

The ritual of jumping over fire has continued in Armenia in the feast of Trndez, which is a feast of purification in the Armenian Apostolic Church and the Armenian Catholic Church, celebrated forty days after Jesus's birth.

=== Sizdah Be-dar ===
In Iran, the Nowruz holidays last thirteen days. On the thirteenth day of the New Year, Iranians leave their houses to enjoy nature and picnic outdoors, as part of the Sizdah Bedar ceremony. The greenery grown for the Haft-sin setting is thrown away, usually into running water. It is also customary for young single people, especially young girls, to tie the leaves of the greenery before discarding it, expressing a wish to find a partner. Another custom associated with Sizdah Bedar is the playing of jokes and pranks, similar to April Fools' Day.

== History ==
=== Origin in Iranian religions ===
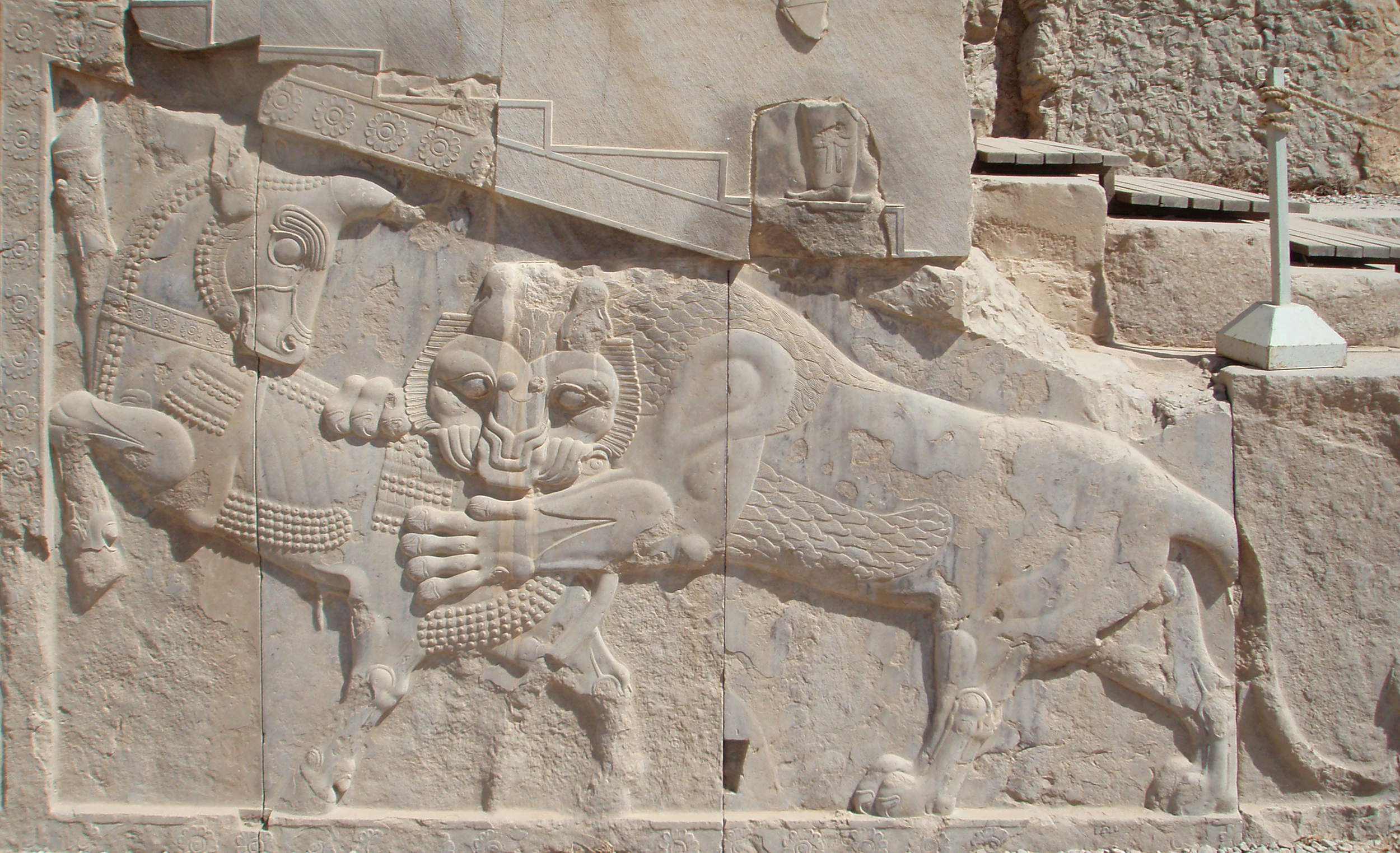
An ancient relief at Persepolis for Nowruz: eternal combat between the bull, representing the Moon, and the lion, representing the Sun and spring.

There exist various foundation myths for Nowruz in Iranian mythology.

The Shahnameh credits the foundation of Nowruz to the mythical Iranian King Jamshid, who saves mankind from a winter destined to kill every living creature. To defeat the killer winter, Jamshid constructed a throne studded with gems. He had demons raise him above the earth into the heavens; there he sat, shining like the Sun. The world's creatures gathered and scattered jewels around him and proclaimed that this was the New Day (Now Ruz). This was the first day of Farvardin, which is the first month of the Iranian calendar.

Although it is not clear whether Proto-Indo-Iranians celebrated a feast as the first day of the calendar, there are indications that Iranians may have observed the beginning of both autumn and spring, respectively related to the harvest and the sowing of seeds, for the celebration of the New Year. Mary Boyce and Frantz Grenet explain the traditions for seasonal festivals and comment: "It is possible that the splendor of the Babylonian festivities at this season, led the Iranians to develop their own spring festival into an established New Year feast, with the name Navasarda "New Year" (a name which, though first attested through Middle Persian derivatives, is attributed to the Achaemenian period)." Akitu was the Babylonian festivity held during the spring month of Nisan in which Nowruz falls. Since the communal observations of the ancient Iranians appear in general to have been seasonal ones and related to agriculture, "it is probable that they traditionally held festivals in both autumn and spring, to mark the major turning points of the natural year."

According to the Iranian history researcher Zana Sepehri Lajani, the origin of Nowruz is associated with Jamshid, who was initially called Jam. It is said that while traveling around the world, Jam reached Sardasht in northwestern Iran. He ordered that an exceptionally beautiful, jewel-encrusted throne be placed on an elevated site facing east.

When this was done, Jam put on a jeweled crown and sat upon the throne. As the sun rose and its light fell upon Jamshid’s crown and throne, an extraordinarily bright and beautiful radiance appeared. The throne began to gleam from the reflection of sunlight, and the people gathered around it rejoiced at the magnificent sight. They declared, “This is a new day.”

In Middle Persian, a ray or beam of light was called shid. Therefore, the suffix shid was added to the name Jam, producing Jamshid, meaning “Jam who radiates light.” A great celebration was held, and from that day onward this ancient tradition was established.

Nowruz is partly rooted in the tradition of Iranian religions, such as Mithraism and Zoroastrianism. In Mithraism, festivals had a deep linkage with the Sun's light. The Iranian festivals such as Mehregan (autumnal equinox), Tirgan, and the eve of Chelle ye Zemestan (winter solstice) also had an origin in the Sun god (Mithra). Among other ideas, Zoroastrianism is the first monotheistic religion that emphasizes broad concepts such as the corresponding work of good and evil in the world, and the connection of humans to nature. Zoroastrian practices were dominant for much of the history of ancient Iran. In Zoroastrianism, the seven most important Zoroastrian festivals are the six Gahambar festivals and Nowruz, which occurs at the spring equinox. According to Mary Boyce, "It seems a reasonable surmise that Nowruz, the holiest of them all, with deep doctrinal significance, was founded by Zoroaster himself"; although there is no clear date of origin. Between sunset on the day of the sixth Gahambar and sunrise of Nowruz, Hamaspathmaedaya (later known, in its extended form, as Frawardinegan; and today is known as Farvardigan) was celebrated. This and the Gahambars are the only festivals named in the surviving text of the Avesta.

The 10th-century scholar Biruni, in his work Kitab al-Tafhim li Awa'il Sina'at al-Tanjim, provides a description of the calendars of various nations. Besides the Iranian calendar, various festivals of Greeks, Jews, Arabs, Sabians, and other nations are mentioned in the book. In the section on the Iranian calendar, he mentions Nowruz, Sadeh, Tirgan, Mehrgan, the six Gahambars, Farvardigan, Bahmanja, Esfand Armaz and several other festivals. According to him, "It is the belief of the Iranians that Nowruz marks the first day when the universe started its motion." The Persian historian Gardizi, in his work titled Zayn al-Akhbār, under the section of the Zoroastrians festivals, mentions Nowruz (among other festivals) and specifically points out that Zoroaster highly emphasized the celebration of Nowruz and Mehrgan.

=== Achaemenid period ===
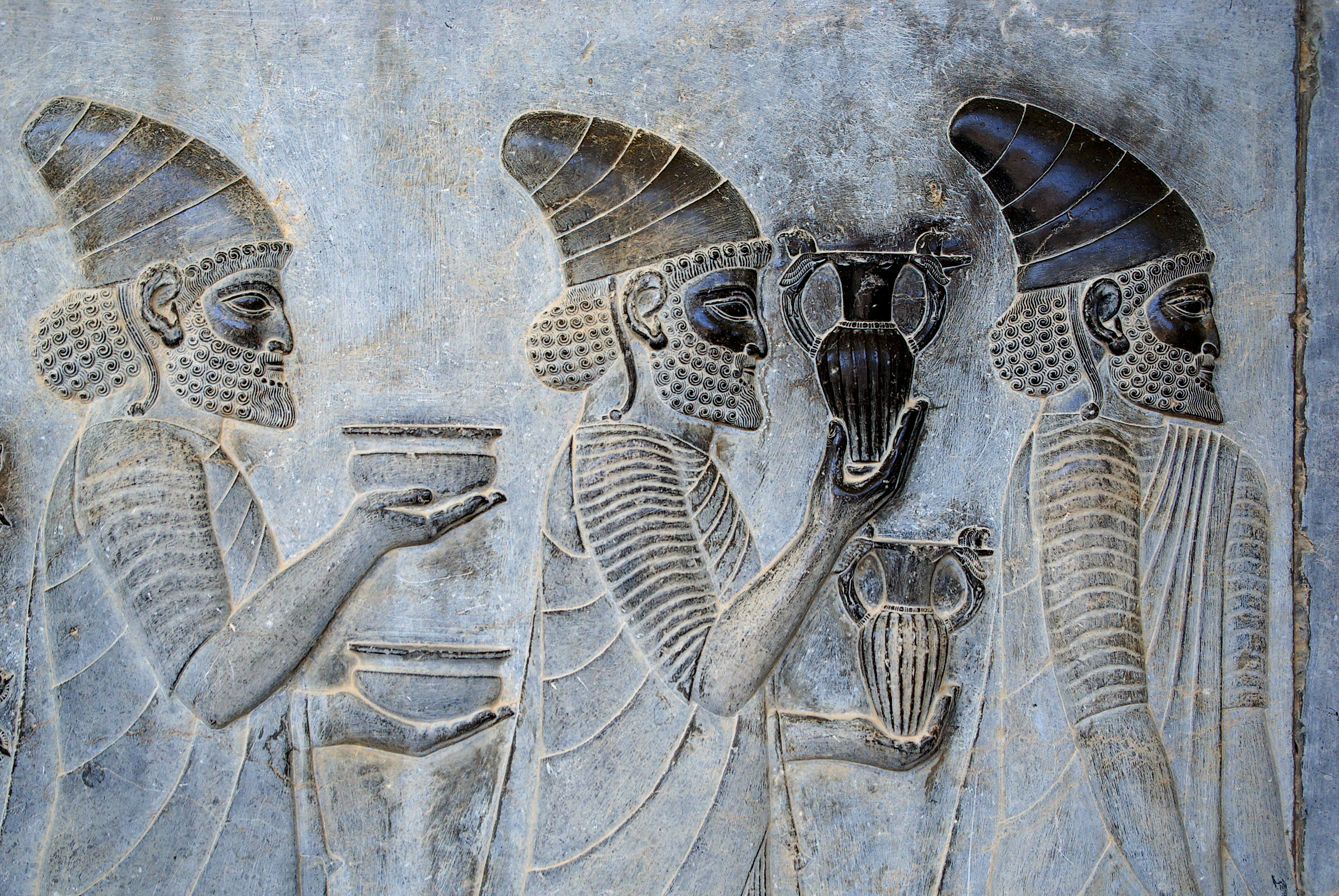
A bas-relief at the Apadana in Persepolis, depicting Armenians bringing their famous wine to the Shah.

Although the word Nowruz is not recorded in Achaemenid inscriptions, there is a detailed account by Xenophon of a Nowruz celebration taking place in Persepolis and the continuity of this festival in the Achaemenid tradition. Nowruz was an important day during the Achaemenid Empire (c. 550–330 BC). Kings of the different Achaemenid nations would bring gifts to the King of Kings. The significance of the ceremony was such that King Cambyses II's appointment as the king of Babylon was legitimized only after his participation in the referred annual Achaemenid festival.

==== Celebrations at Persepolis ====
It has been suggested that the famous Persepolis complex, or at least the palace of Apadana and the Hundred Columns Hall, were built for the specific purpose of celebrating a feast related to Nowruz.

==== Iranian and Jewish calendars ====
In 539 BC, the Jews came under Iranian rule, thus exposing both groups to each other's customs. According to the Encyclopædia Britannica, the story of Purim as told in the Book of Esther is adapted from an Iranian novella about the shrewdness of harem queens, suggesting that Purim may be an adoption of Iranian New Year. A specific novella is not identified and Encyclopedia Britannica itself notes that "no Jewish texts of this genre from the Persian period are extant, so these new elements can be recognized only inferentially." Purim is celebrated the 14 of Adar, usually within a month before Nowruz (as the date of Purim is set according to the Jewish calendar, which is lunisolar), while Nowruz occurs at the spring equinox. It is possible that the Jews and Iranians of the time may have shared or adopted similar customs for these holidays. The Lunar new year of the Middle East occurs on 1 Nisan, the new moon of the first month of spring, which usually falls within a few weeks of Nowruz.

==== Legacy in Persian literature ====
In his Shahnameh, the tenth-century poet Ferdowsi narrates a fictional account of Darius III's death, where an injured Darius, with his head cradled on Alexander the Great’s thigh, asks Alexander to wed Roxana, so their children might uphold Nowruz and keep the flame of Zoroaster burning:

Her mother named her Roxana the fair; The world found joy and solace in her care. ... From her, perhaps, a glorious one shall rise; Who shall renew the name of bold Esfandiyār, wise. This sacred flame of Zoroaster, he shall adorn; The Zend and Avesta scriptures, in his hands be borne. The feast of Sadeh, this auspicious rite he'll keep; The splendor of Nowruz and fire temples deep.

— Ferdowsi

=== Parthian and Sasanian periods ===
Nowruz was the holiday of Parthian dynastic empires who ruled Iran (248 BC–224 AD) and the other areas ruled by the Arsacid dynasties outside of Parthia (such as the Arsacid dynasties of Armenia and Iberia). There are specific references to the celebration of Nowruz during the reign of Vologases I (51–78 AD), but these include no details. Before the Sasanians established their power in Western Asia in 224 – 226 AD, Parthians celebrated Nowruz in autumn, and the first of Farvardin began at the autumn equinox. During the reign of the Parthian dynasty, the spring festival was Mehregan, a Zoroastrian and Iranian festival celebrated in honor of Mithra.

Extensive records on the celebration of Nowruz appear following the accession of Ardashir I, the founder of the Sasanian Empire (224–651 AD). Under the Sassanid emperors, Nowruz was celebrated as the most important day of the year. Most royal traditions of Nowruz, such as royal audiences with the public, cash gifts, and the pardoning of prisoners, were established during the Sassanid era and persisted unchanged until modern times.

=== Arab conquest and Islamization of Persia ===
Nowruz, along with the mid-winter celebration Sadeh, survived the Muslim conquest of Persia of 650 CE. Other celebrations such as the Gahambars and Mehrgan were eventually side-lined or only observed by Zoroastrians. Nowruz became the main royal holiday during the Abbasid period. Much like their predecessors in the Sasanian period, Dehqans would offer gifts to the caliphs and local rulers at the Nowruz and Mehragan festivals.

Following the demise of the caliphate and the subsequent re-emergence of Iranian dynasties such as the Samanids and Buyids, Nowruz became an even more important event. The Buyids revived the ancient traditions of Sassanian times and restored many smaller celebrations that had been eliminated by the caliphate. The Iranian Buyid ruler 'Adud al-Dawla (r. 949–983) customarily welcomed Nowruz in a majestic hall, decked with gold and silver plates and vases full of fruit and colorful flowers. The King would sit on the royal throne, and the court astronomer would come forward, kiss the ground, and congratulate him on the arrival of the New Year. The king would then summon musicians and singers, and invited his friends to gather and enjoy a great festive occasion.

Later Turkic and Mongol invaders did not attempt to abolish Nowruz.

In 1079 CE during the Seljuk era, a group of eight scholars led by astronomer and polymath Omar Khayyam calculated and established the Jalali calendar, computing the year starting from Nowruz.

The festival along with Mehregan was widely celebrated in Al-Andalus, as the Andalusians from the 9th century onwards strongly identified with many Iranian traditions despite the opposition from the Maliki jurists. Also, from the 10th century onwards the nobility, emirs and governors sponsored the celebrations and festivals. However, the jurists beginning from the 12th century started encouraging the Andalusians to celebrate Mawlid instead.

=== Contemporary era ===
Before the collapse of the Soviet Union, Iran and Afghanistan were the only countries that officially observed the ceremonies of Nowruz. When the Caucasian and Central Asian countries gained independence from the Soviets, they also declared Nowruz as a national holiday.

Nowruz was added to the UNESCO List of the Intangible Cultural Heritage of Humanity in 2010.

During the Iranian economic crisis in 2025 many people were unable to afford basic haft-sin. In the same year, the Iranian government arrested 50 people for an anti-government chant at Nowruz celebrations.

== Customs ==
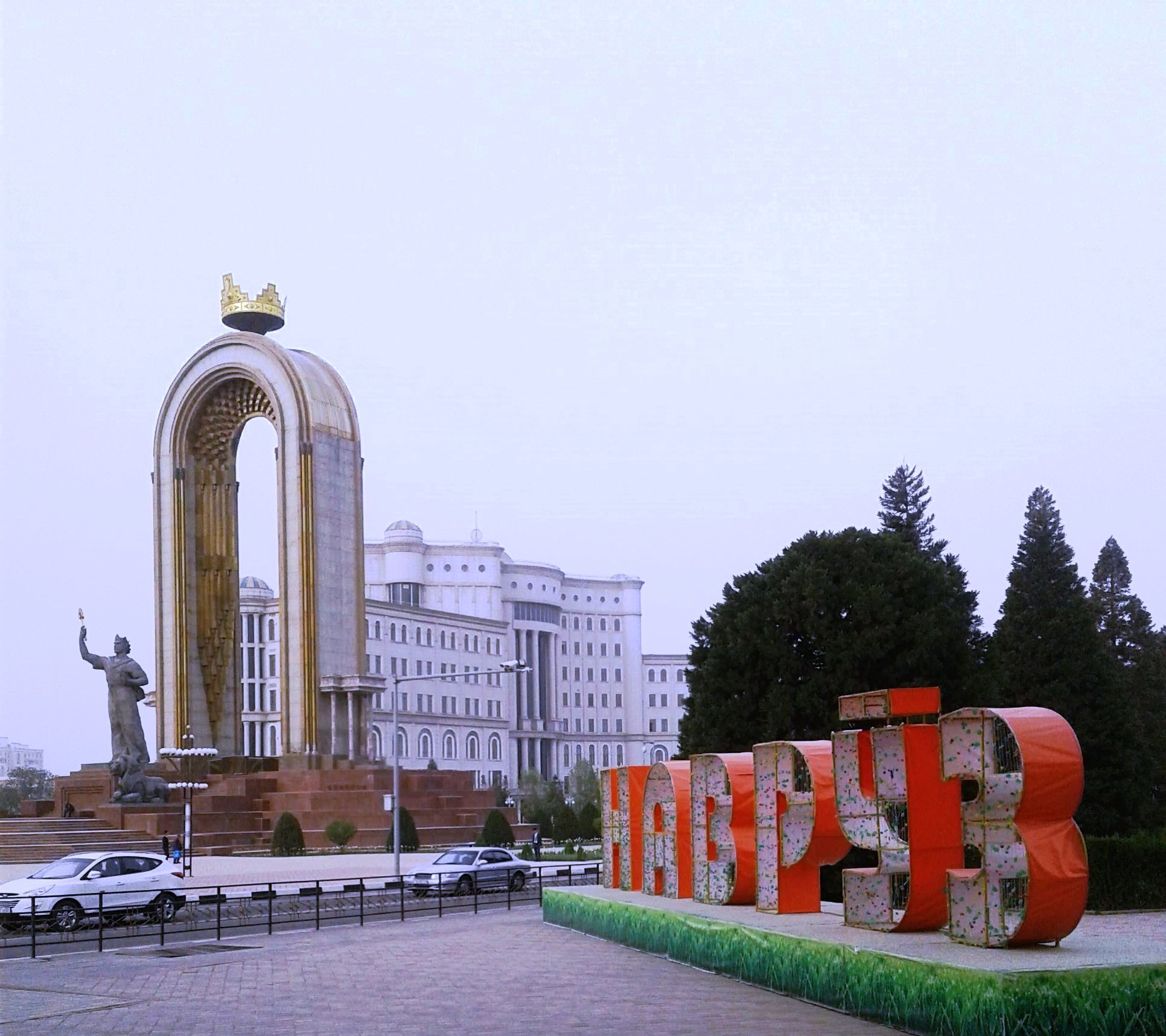
Nowruz in Dushanbe, Tajikistan, 2018

=== House cleaning and shopping ===
House cleaning, or shaking the house (Persian: خانه تکانی, romanized: xāne tekāni) is commonly done before the arrival of Nowruz. People start preparing for Nowruz with a major spring cleaning of their homes and by buying new clothes to wear for the New Year, as well as the purchase of flowers. The hyacinth and the tulip are popular and conspicuous.

=== Visiting family and friends ===
During the Nowruz holidays, people are expected to make short visits to the homes of family, friends and neighbors. Typically, young people will visit their elders first, and the elders return their visit later. Visitors are offered tea and pastries, cookies, fresh and dried fruits and mixed nuts or other snacks. Many Iranians throw large Nowruz parties as a way of dealing with the long distances between groups of friends and family.

=== Food preparation ===
One of the most common foods cooked on the occasion of Nowruz is Samanu (Samanak, Somank, Somalek, Sumalak). This food is prepared using germinated wheat. In most countries that celebrate Nowruz, this food is cooked. In some countries, cooking this food is associated with certain rituals. Women and girls in different parts of Iran, Afghanistan, Tajikistan, Turkmenistan and Uzbekistan cook Samanu in groups and sometimes during the night, and when cooking it, they sing memorable songs.

Cooking other foods is also common on Nowruz. For example, sabzi polo with fish is eaten on Eid night, as are sweets such as Nan-e Nokhodchi. In general, cooking Nowruz food is common in every region where Nowruz is celebrated, and each area has its food and sweets.

=== Boloni ===
As a fortune telling method people may write a hafez poem on a paper and throw in a jug called a "boloni" along with a belonging of theirs. A young girl would then read the poems to others and then pull out a belonging.

=== Haft-sin ===
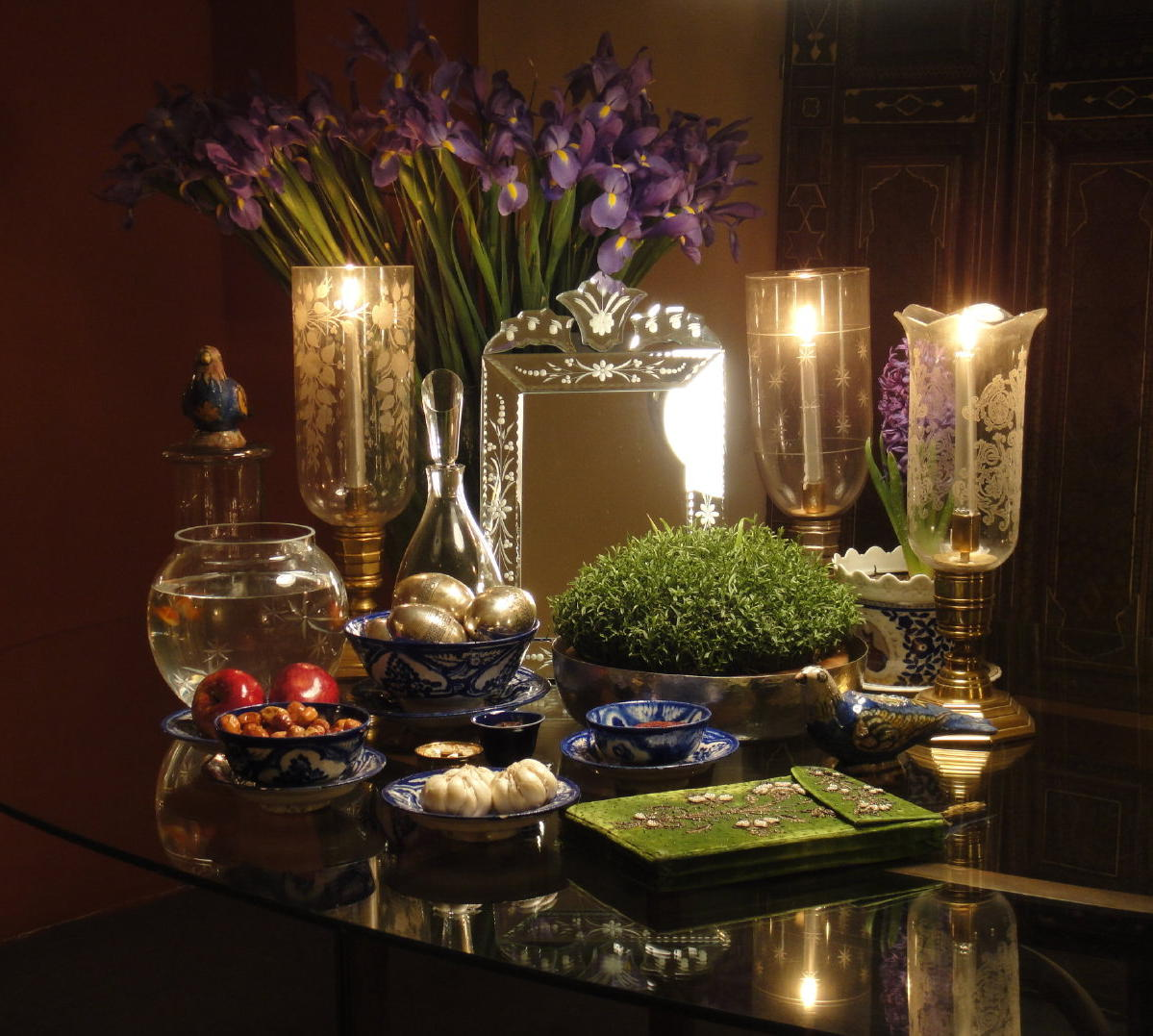
Haft-sin during Nowruz in Tehran, Iran, 2010

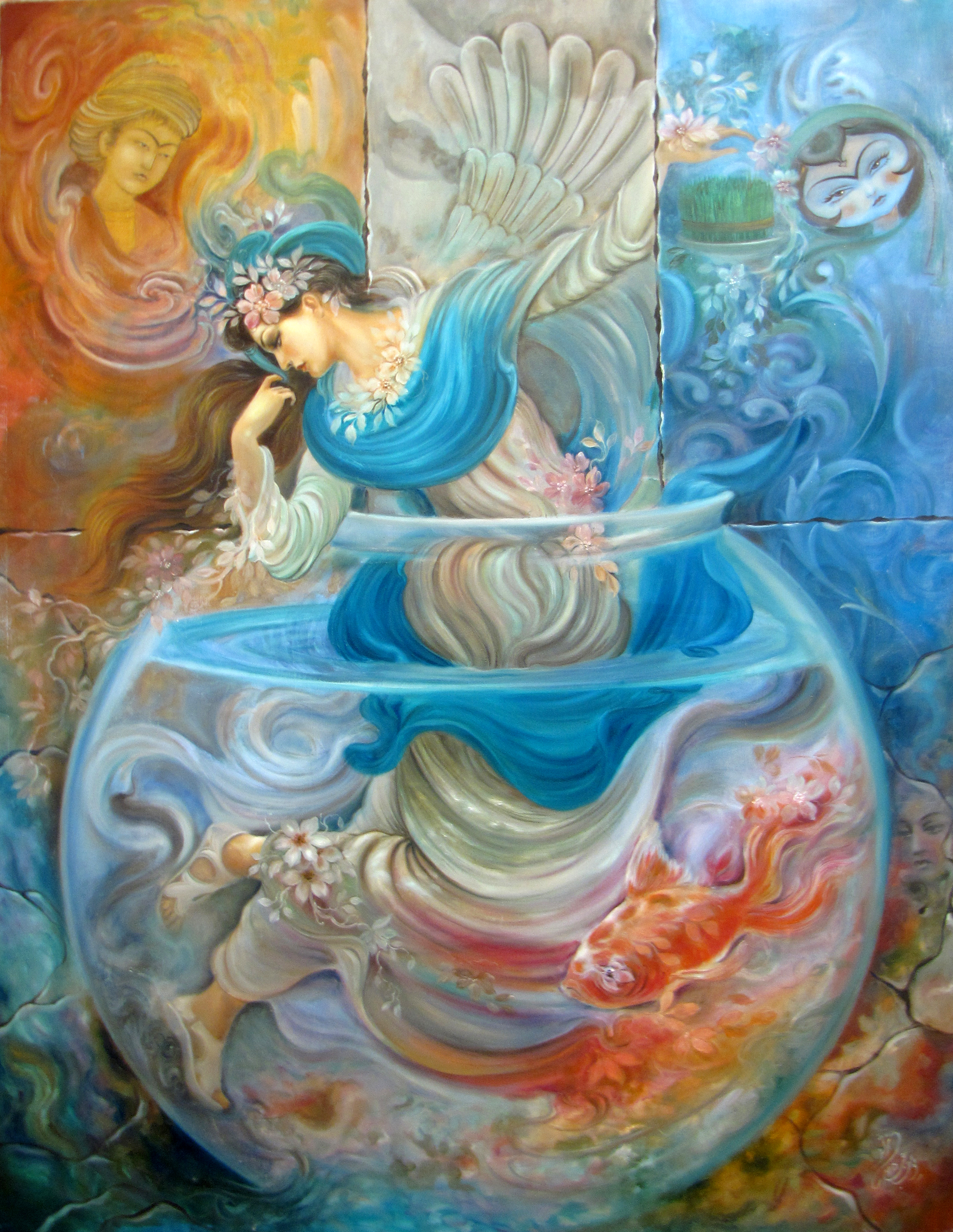
A painting depicting Nowruz's haft-sin in relation to the four classical elements and the world's three essential forms of life: humans, animals, and plants.

Typically, before the arrival of Nowruz, family members gather around the Haft-sin table and await the exact moment of the March equinox to celebrate the New Year. The number 7 and the letter S are related to the seven Ameshasepantas as mentioned in the Zend-Avesta. They relate to the four elements of Fire, Earth, Air, Water, and the three life forms of Humans, Animals and Plants. In modern times, the explanation was simplified to mean that the Haft-sin (Persian: هفت‌سین, seven things beginning with the letter sin (س)) are:

- Sabze (Persian: سبزه) – wheat, barley, mung bean, or lentil sprouts grown in a dish.
- Samanu (Persian: سمنو) – sweet pudding made from germinated wheat
- Persian olive (Persian: سنجد, romanized: senjed)
- Vinegar (Persian: سرکه, romanized: serke)
- Apple (Persian: سیب, romanized: sib)
- Garlic (Persian: سیر, romanized: sir)
- Sumac (Persian: سماق, romanized: somāq)

The Haft-sin table may also include a mirror, candles, painted eggs, a bowl of water, goldfish, coins, hyacinth, and traditional confectioneries. A "book of wisdom" such as the Quran, Bible, Avesta, the Šāhnāme of Ferdowsi, or the divān of Hafez may also be included. Haft-sin's origins are not clear. The practice is believed to have been popularized over the past 100 years.

=== Haft-mewa ===
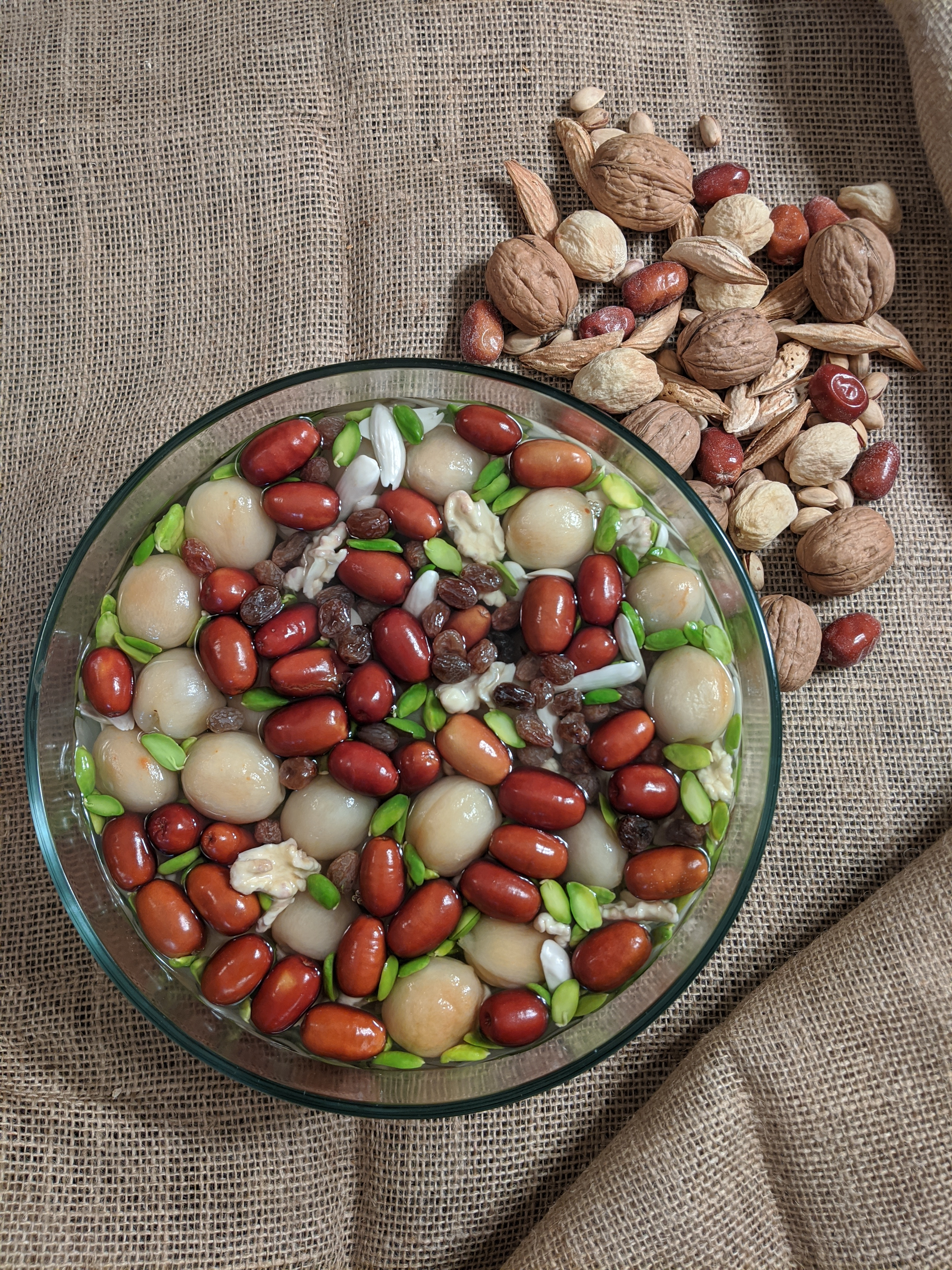
Haft-mewa during Nowruz in Afghanistan, 2020

In Afghanistan, people prepare Haft Mēwa (Dari: هفت میوه, English: seven fruits) for Nauruz, a mixture of seven different dried fruits and nuts (such as raisins, silver berry, pistachios, hazelnuts, prunes, walnut, and almonds) served in syrup.

=== Khoncha ===
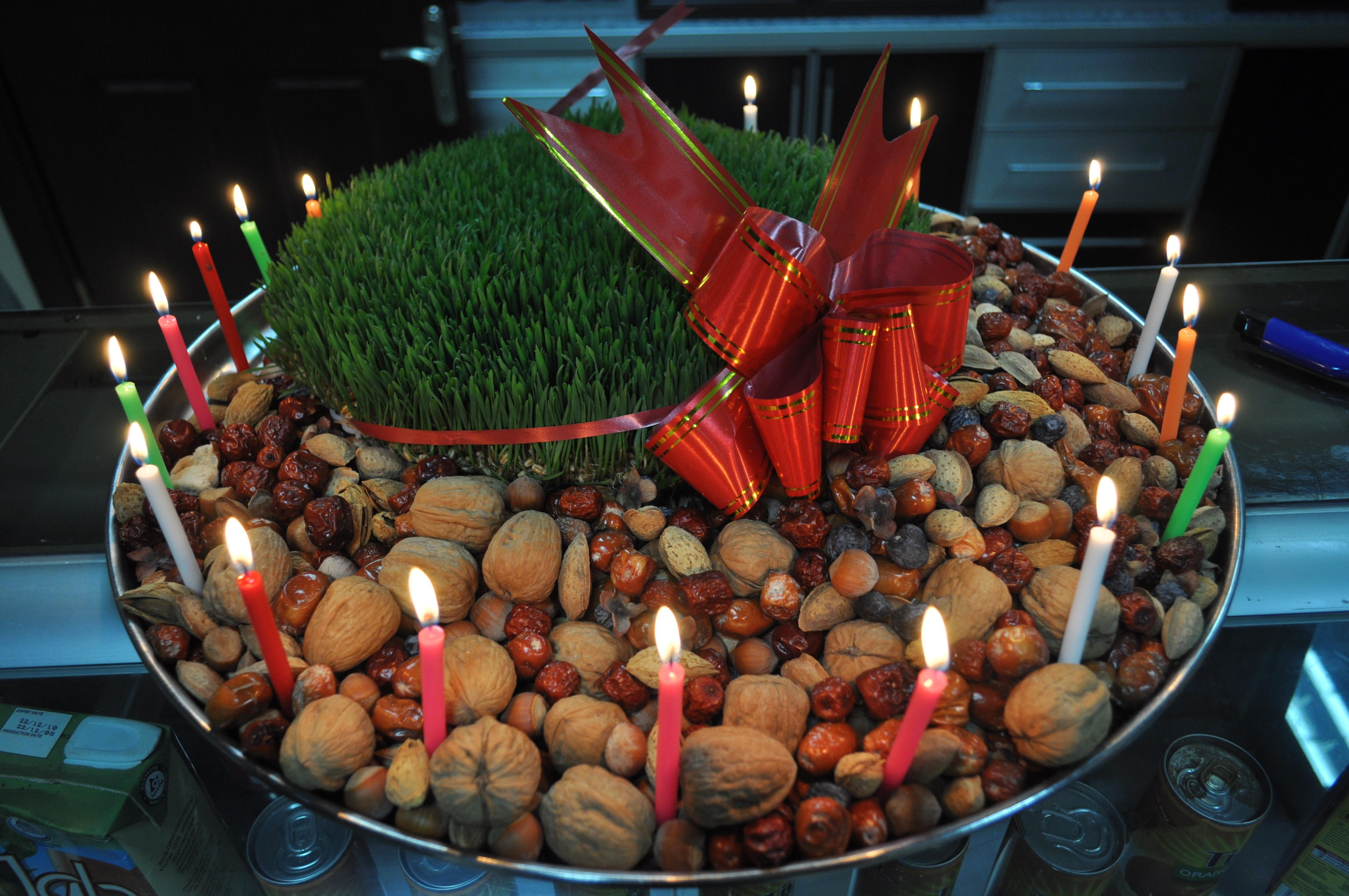
Khoncha during Nowruz in Azerbaijan, 2011

Khoncha (Azerbaijani: Xonça; خونچا) is the traditional display of Nowruz in Azerbaijan. It consists of a big silver or copper tray, with a tray of green, sprouting wheat (samani) in the middle and a dyed egg for each member of the family arranged around it. The table should contain at least seven dishes.

=== Amu Nowruz and Hajji Firuz ===
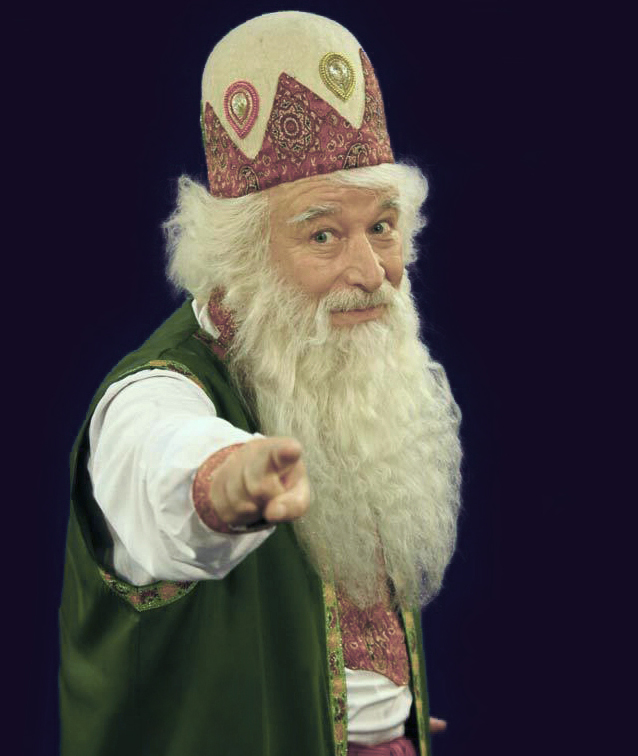
An Iranian actor playing as Amu Nowruz, 2016

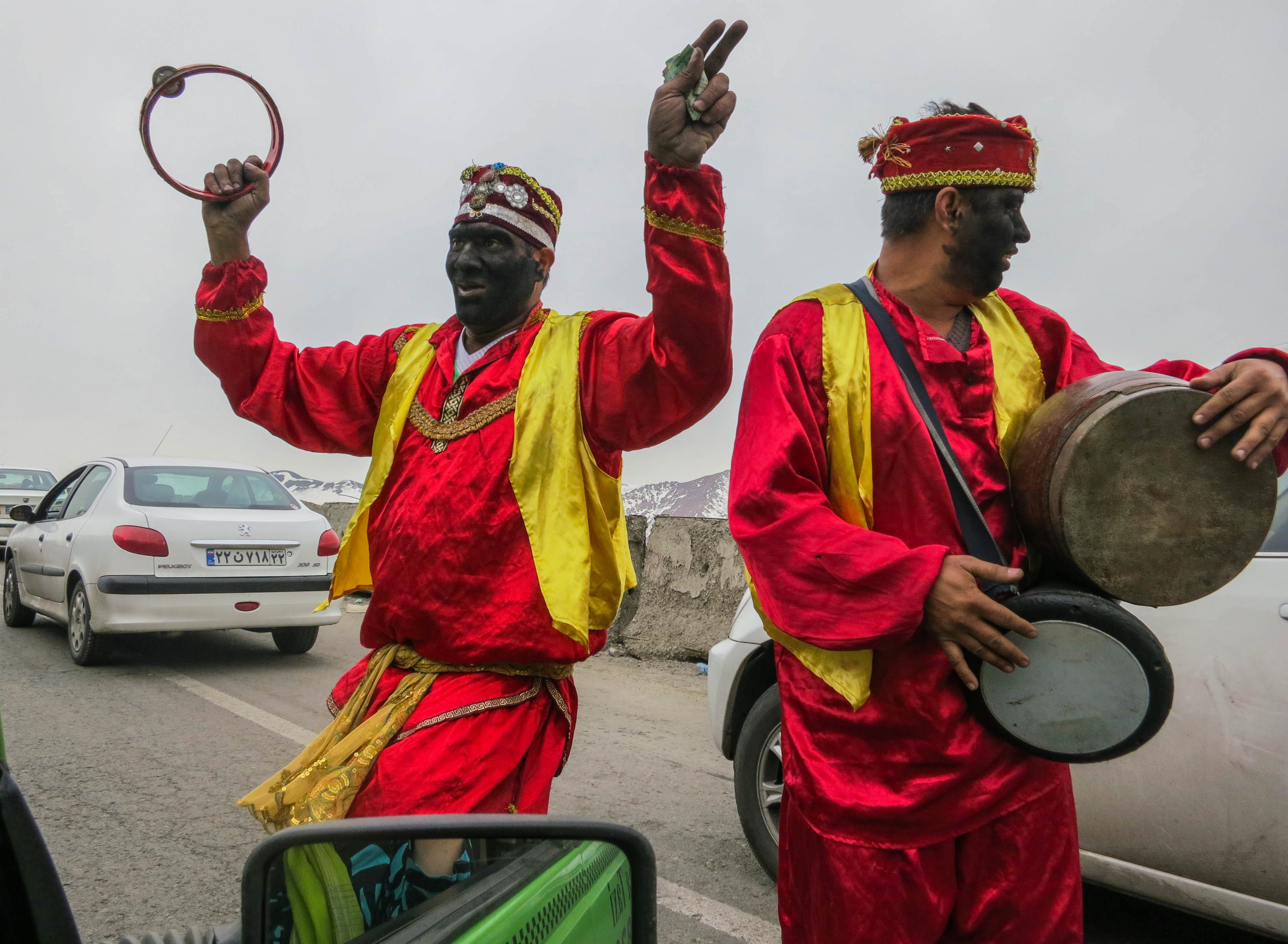
Iranian street performers playing as Hajji Firuz in Tehran, 2013

In Iran, the traditional heralds of the festival of Nowruz are Amu Nowruz (Persian: عمو نوروز) and Haji Firuz (Persian: حاجی فیروز), who appear in the streets to celebrate the New Year.

Amu Nowruz brings children gifts, much like his counterpart Santa Claus. He is the husband of Nane Sarma, with whom he shares a traditional love story in which they can meet each other only once a year. He is depicted as an elderly silver-haired man with a long beard carrying a walking stick, wearing a felt hat, a long cloak of blue canvas, a sash, giveh, and linen trousers.

Haji Firuz, a character with his face and hands covered in soot, clad in bright red clothes and a felt hat, is the companion of Amu Nowruz. He dances through the streets while singing and playing the tambourine. In the traditional songs, he introduces himself as a serf trying to cheer people whom he refers to as his lords.

=== Kosa and Kechal ===
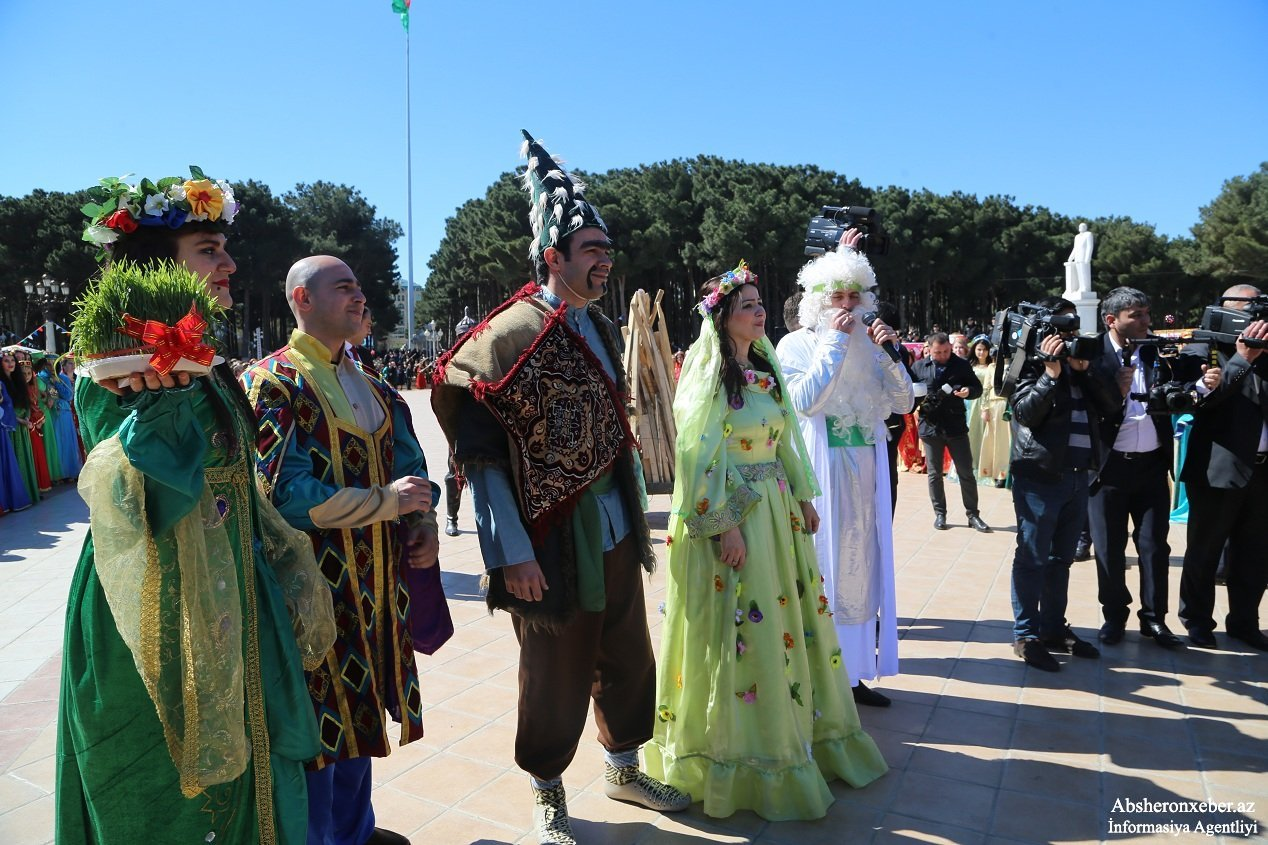
Kosa (third from the left) and Kechal (second from the left) at Nowruz celebrations in Azerbaijan

Kosa and Kechal (Azerbaijani: Kosa və Keçəl; كوسا و كئچل) are two comical characters from Azerbaijan who appear in the streets to celebrate Nowruz. Kosa is typically depicted as a "plump skinny man with a fake beard" who can't grow facial hair and symbolizes the winter, while Kechal is a "bald myschievious fat man" who symbolizes the summer, with his name literally translating to bald-head from Azerbaijani. When Nowruz arrives, they play Kos-kosa (a traditional Azerbaijani Nowruz game) with the kids, paint eggs, sing songs and often fight with each other, symbolizing the arrival of spring. Kosa and Kechal have become one of the, if not the most, famous characters in Azerbaijani Nowruz traditions, gaining large amounts of attention and taking part in mainstream talkshows and movies.

=== Kampirak ===
In the folklore of Afghanistan, Kampirak and his retinue pass village by village, distributing gathered charities among people. He is an old, bearded man wearing colorful clothes with a long hat and rosary who symbolizes beneficence and the power of nature yielding the forces of winter. The tradition is observed in central provinces, specially Bamyan and Daykundi.

=== Nauryz kozhe ===
In Kazakhstan, Kazakhs start the new year by cooking nauryz kozhe, a traditional drink.

== Communities ==
The festival of Nowruz is celebrated by many groups of people in the Black Sea basin, the Balkans, the South Caucasus, Western Asia, central and southern Asia, and by Iranian peoples worldwide.

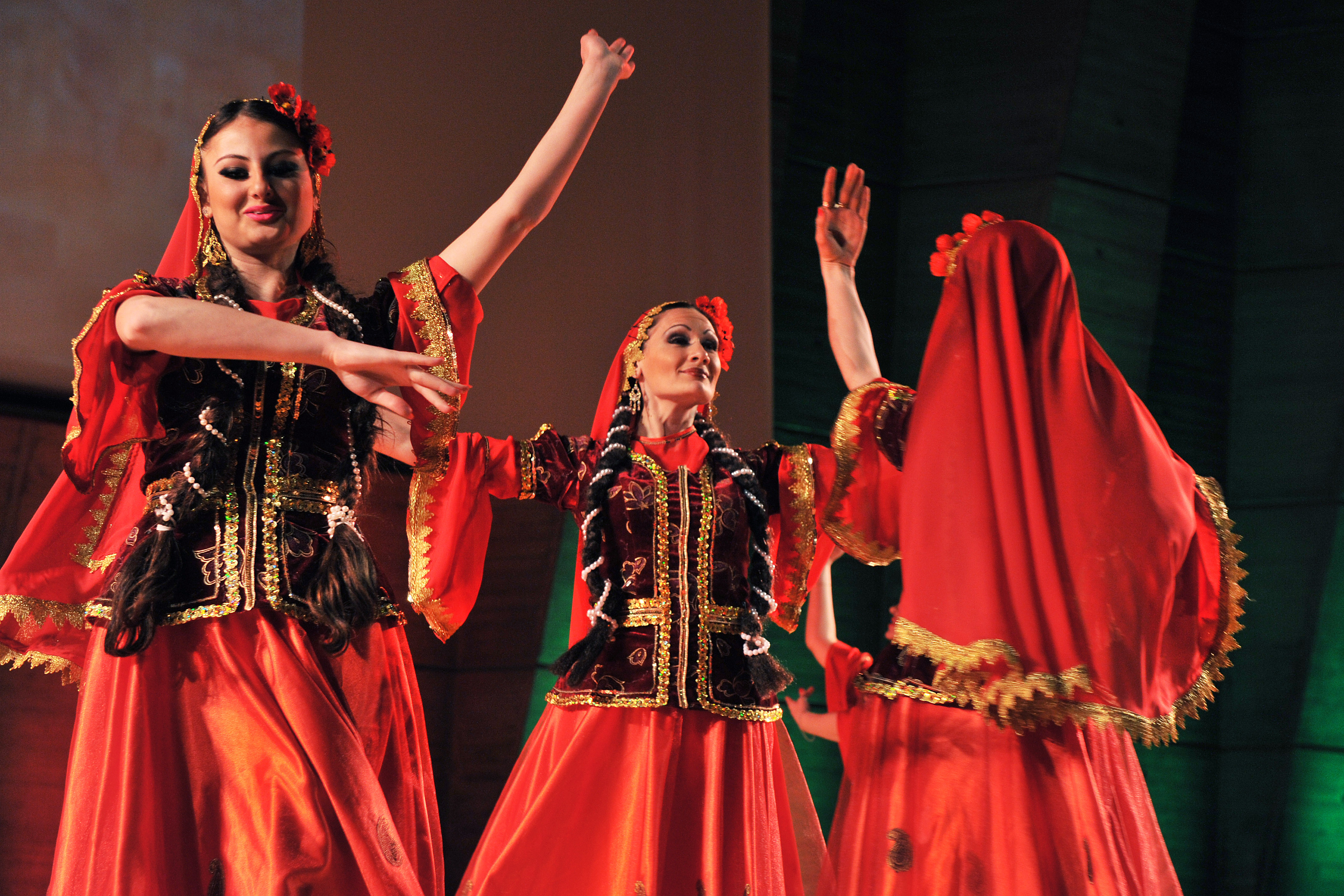
Traditional Nowruz dance performance at the UNESCO Headquarters in Paris, France, 2011

Places where Nowruz is a public holiday include:

- Afghanistan
- Albania
- Azerbaijan (five days)
- Georgia
- Iran (thirteen days)
- Iraqi Kurdistan, Iraq
- Kazakhstan (four days)
- Kosovo
- Kyrgyzstan
- Bayan-Ölgii, Mongolia
- Tajikistan (four days)
- Turkmenistan (two days)
- Uzbekistan
- Syria (Syrian Kurds).

Nowruz is celebrated by Kurds in Iraq Syria, and Turkey, as well as by the Iranis, Shias and Parsis in the Indian subcontinent and Iranian diaspora.

Nowruz is also celebrated by Iranian communities in the Americas and in Europe, including Los Angeles, Phoenix, Toronto, Cologne and London. In Phoenix, Arizona, Nowruz is celebrated at the Persian New Year Festival. But because Los Angeles is prone to devastating fires, there are very strict fire codes in the city. Usually, Iranians living in Southern California go to the beaches to celebrate the event where it is permissible to build fires. On 15 March 2010, the United States House of Representatives passed the Nowruz Resolution (H.Res. 267), by a 384–2 vote, "Recognizing the cultural and historical significance of Nowruz".

=== Afghanistan ===
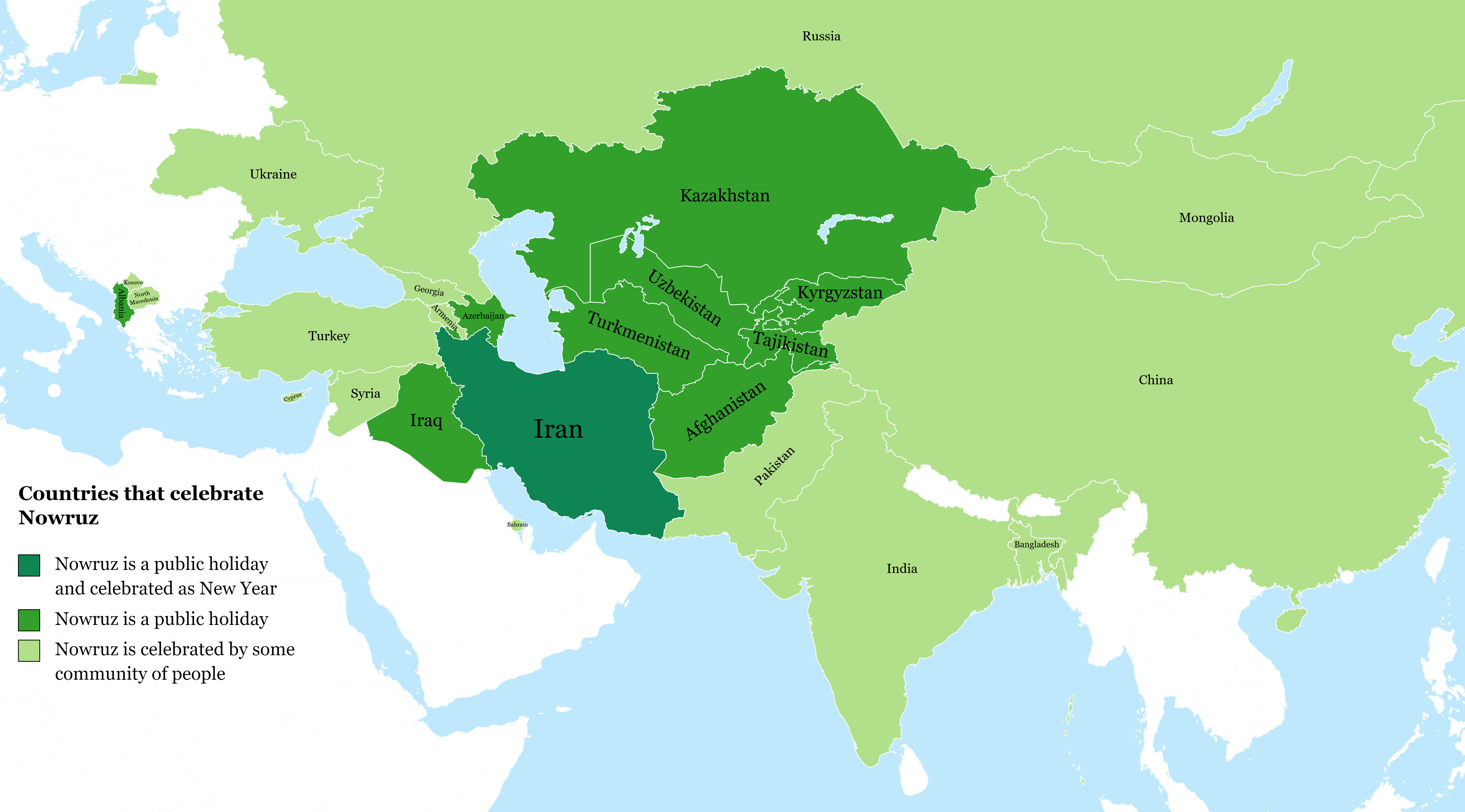
Countries that celebrate Nowruz

Nowruz marks Afghanistan's New Year's Day with the Solar Hijri Calendar as their official calendar. In Afghanistan, the festival of Gul-i-Surkh (Dari: گل سرخ, 'red flower') is the principal festival for Nauruz. It is celebrated in Mazar-i-Sharif during the first 40 days of the year, when red tulips grow in the green plains and over the hills surrounding the city. People from all over the country travel to Mazar-i-Sharif to attend the Nauruz festivals. Buzkashi tournaments are held during the Gul-i-Surkh festival in Mazar-i-Sharif, Kabul and other northern Afghan cities.

Jahenda Bala (Dari: جهنده بالا, 'raising') is celebrated on the first day of the New Year. It is a religious ceremony performed at the Blue Mosque of Mazar-i-Sharif by raising a special banner resembling the Derafsh Kaviani royal standard. It is attended by high-ranking government officials such as the Vice-President, Ministers, and Provincial Governors and is the biggest recorded Nawroz gathering, with up to 200,000 people from all over Afghanistan attending.

In the festival of Dehqān (Dari: دهقان, 'farmer'), also celebrated on the first day of the New Year, farmers walk in the cities as a sign of encouragement for the agricultural production. In recent years, this activity only happens in Kabul and other major cities where the mayor and other government officials attend.

During the first two weeks of the New Year, the citizens of Kabul hold family picnics in Istalif, Charikar and other green places where redbuds grow.

During the Taliban regime of 1996–2001, Nauruz was banned as "an ancient pagan holiday centered on fire worship". In March 2022, the Taliban said that Nauruz would not be a public holiday that year, although allowed celebrations to take place.

=== Albania ===
Nevruz is celebrated annually in Albania on 22 March as Sultan Nevruz. In Albania, the festival commemorates the birthday of Ali ibn Abi Talib (died 661 CE) and simultaneously the advent of spring. It is prominent amongst the nations' Bektashis, but adherents of Sunnism, Catholicism, and Orthodoxy also "share in the nevruz festival to respect the ecumenical spirit of Albania".

=== Armenia ===
Since the 19th century, Nowruz has not generally been celebrated by Armenians and is not a public holiday in Armenia. However, it is celebrated in Armenia by tens of thousands of Iranian tourists who visit Armenia with relative ease. The influx of tourists from Iran accelerated since around 2010–11. In 2010 alone, around 27,600 Iranians spent Nowruz in capital Yerevan.

In 2015, President Serzh Sargsyan sent a letter of congratulations to Kurds living in Armenia and to the Iranian political leadership on the occasion of Nowruz.

=== Azerbaijan ===
In Azerbaijan, Nowruz celebrations go on for several days and included festive public dancing and folk music, and sporting competitions. In rural areas, crop holidays are also marked. Additionally, in Azerbaijani tradition, the weather on the first day of Novruz is believed to forecast the seasons: spring, summer follows on the second day, autumn on the third, and winter on the fourth.

Communities of the Azerbaijani diaspora also celebrate Nowruz in the US, Canada, and Israel.

=== Bangladesh ===
Nowruz is generally not celebrated by Bangladeshis, but it is widely celebrated by the country's Shia Muslims. It continues to be celebrated regularly in some areas of Dhaka, Chittagong, Rajshahi and Khulna. During the Mughal period, Nowruz was celebrated for 19 days with pomp and gaiety. Shia Muslims in Bangladesh have been seen spraying water around their home and drinking that water to keep themselves protected from diseases. A congregation to seek divine blessing is also arranged. Members of the Nawab family of Dhaka used to celebrate it amid pomp and grandeur. In the evening, they used to float thousands of candle lights in nearby ponds and water bodies. The National poet Kazi Nazrul Islam, also a Sunni, portrayed a vivid sketch of the festival highlighting its various aspects. In his poem, he described it as a platform of exposing a youth's physical and mental beauty to another opposite one for conquering his or her heart.

=== Central Asia ===
Nowruz widely celebrated on a vast territory of Central Asia and ritual practice acquired its special features. The festival was legitimized by prayers at mosques, and visits to the mazars of Muslim saints and to sacred streams. In the Emirate of Bukhara, a broad official celebration of Nowruz was started by Amir Muzaffar, who sought to strengthen the image of the Manghyt dynasty during the crisis of political legitimacy. Currently, all five Central Asian countries (Tajikistan, Kyrgyzstan, Uzbekistan, Turkmenistan, Kazakhstan) celebrate Nowruz as a public holiday.

=== China ===
Traditionally, Nowruz is celebrated mainly in China's Xinjiang Uyghur Autonomous Region by the Uyghurs, Chinese Tajik, Salar, Kyrgyz and Kazakh ethnicities.

=== Georgia ===
Nowruz is not celebrated by Georgians, but it is widely celebrated by the country's large Azerbaijani minority (~7% of the total population) as well as by Iranians living in Georgia. Every year, large festivities are held in the capital Tbilisi, as well as in areas with a significant number of Azerbaijanis, such as the Kvemo Kartli, Kakheti, Shida Kartli, and Mtskheta-Mtianeti regions. Georgian politicians have attended the festivities in the capital over the years, and have congratulated the Nowruz-observing ethnic groups and nationals in Georgia on the day of Nowruz.

=== India ===
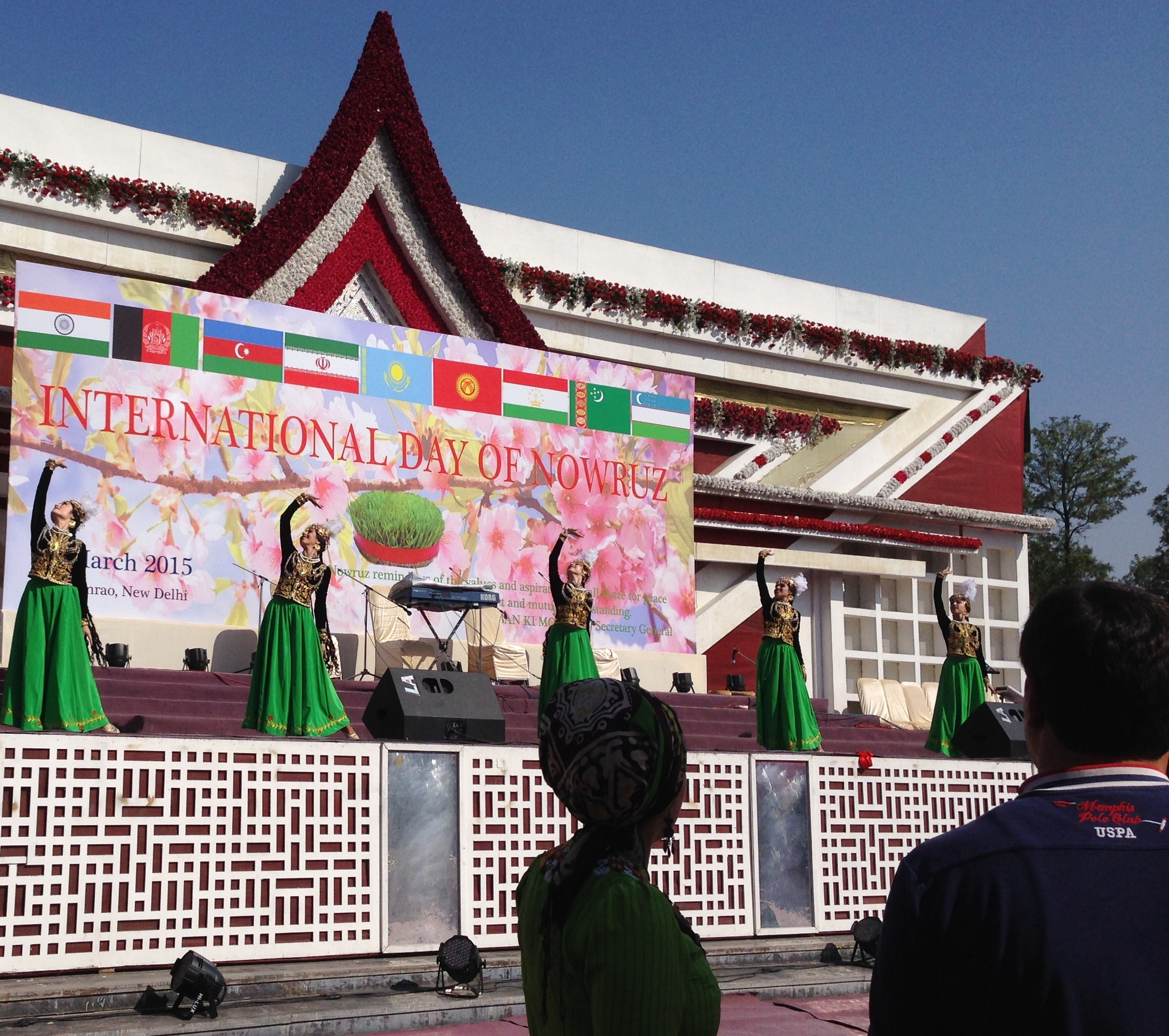
Traditional Nowruz dance performance in New Delhi, India, 2015

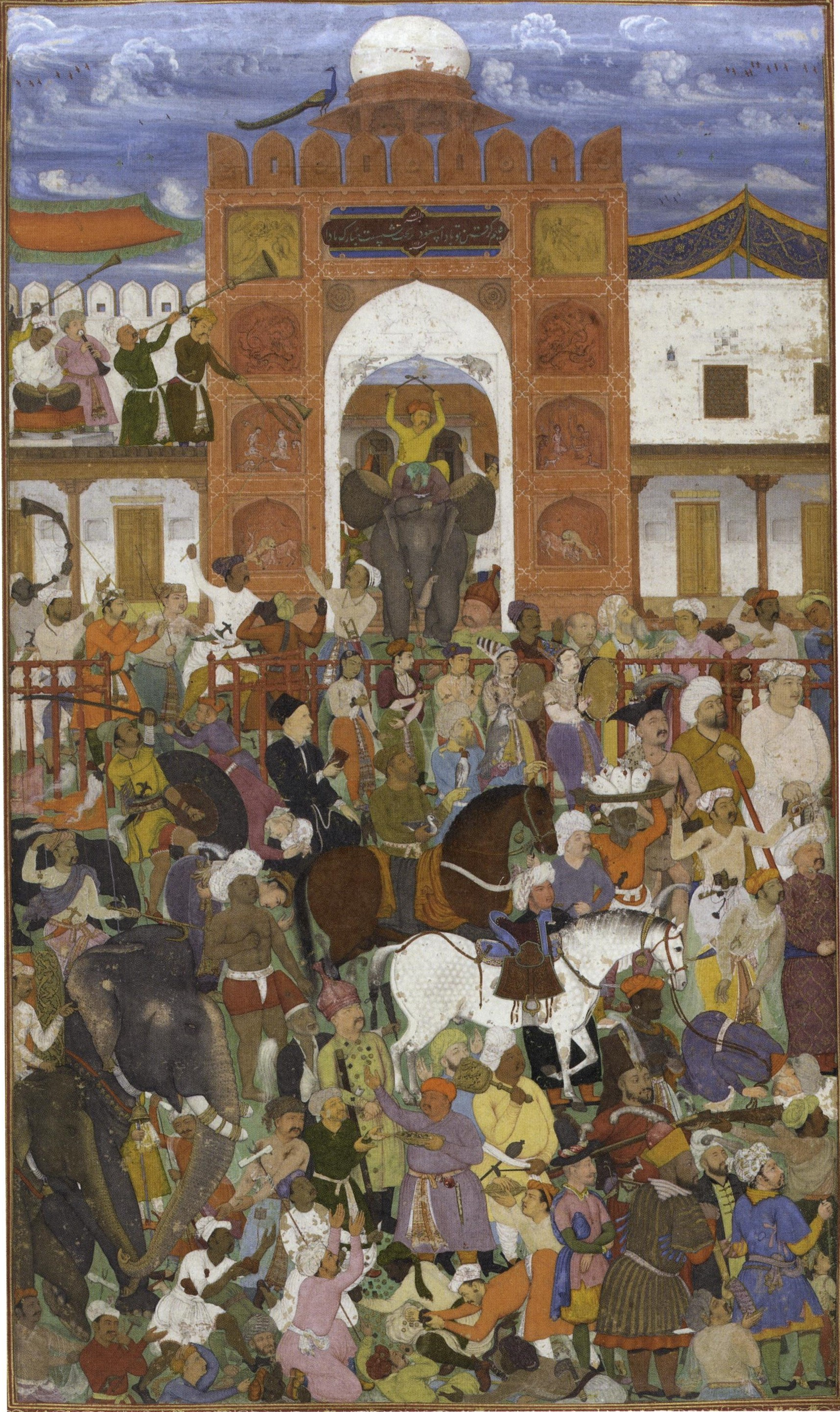
Artistic impression of a Nowruz celebration in the Mughal Empire during the reign of Jahangir, depicted as part of the St. Petersburg Album of the Russian Academy of Sciences.

The tradition of Nowruz in Northern India dates back to the Mughal Empire; the festival was celebrated for 19 days with pomp and gaiety in the realm. However, it further goes back to the Parsi Zoroastrian community in Western India, who migrated to the Indian subcontinent from Persia during the Muslim conquest of Persia of 636–651 CE.

In the Princely State of Hyderabad, Nowruz (Nauroz) was one of the four holidays where the Nizam would hold a public Darbar, along with the two official Islamic holidays and the sovereign's birthday. Prior to Asaf Jahi rule in Hyderabad, the Qutb Shahi dynasty celebrated Nowruz with a ritual called Panjeri, and the festival was celebrated by all with great grandeur.

A popular Deccani Urdu poem written by the founder of Hyderabad, Muhammad Quli Qutb Shah, is recited in the Deccan region on Nauroz:

کہ نس دن عید ہور نوروز منج کوں نت خدا دیتا
مرے دل مرغ کی خاطر پھولاں عشرت نوا دیتا

Translation:

The way God has given me Eid and Nauroz forevermore
The flowers give the birds of my heart bliss and joy galore

=== Iran ===
Nowruz is a two-week celebration that marks the beginning of the New Year in Iran's official Solar Hijri calendar. The celebration includes four public holidays from the first to the fourth day of Farvardin, the first month of the Iranian calendar, usually beginning on 21 March. On the Eve of Nowruz, the fire festival Chaharshanbe Suri is celebrated. Following the 1979 Iranian Revolution, some radical elements from the Islamic government attempted to suppress Nowruz, considering it a pagan holiday and a distraction from Islamic holidays. Nowruz has been politicized, with political leaders making annual Nowruz speeches.

==== Nowruz and food inflation in Iran ====
As of 2025 the inflation in Iran is skyrocketing and specifically, the food prices are surging.

As a result the prices of Haft Sin items and traditional Nowruz foods in Iran have significantly increased, reflecting the country's ongoing economic challenges and high inflation rates.

The overall cost of preparing a Haft-Seen table is estimated to exceed half a million tomans in 2025. Adding a fish and vegetable pilaf to the New Year's Eve meal pushes the total cost for a typical household to approximately 1,600,000 tomans.

The price of specific food items have notably increased:

- Dates increased from 110,000 tomans per kilogram in early March to 135,000 tomans by mid-March 2025 (an increase of 22.7%).
- Lentils and white beans jumped from 85,000 tomans per kilogram in mid-February to 105,000 tomans by mid-March 2025 (an increase of 23.5%).
- Iranian rice prices have risen by 45% over the past year, with one kilogram increasing from one million rials to 1.45 million rials (an increase of 45%).
- Imported rice prices surged even more dramatically, with a 10-kilogram bag of Pakistani rice increasing from 6.5 million rials in January 2024 to 17.5 million rials in January 2025, representing a 169% increase.
- Fruits, which are often part of the Haft Sin spread, have also seen price increase:
- pomegranates saw the highest price increase at 11.1%, followed by bananas (3.7%) and apples (3.6%) compared to the previous month. In contrast, some fruits experienced slight price declines, with melons dropping by 9.6% and oranges by 4.6%.
- A kilo of beef costs 9,900,000 rials ($10.50), cooking oil is 5,700,000 rials ($6.10), and even a simple loaf of bread is 200,000 rials (21 cents). Kiwis cost 1,500,000 rials ($1.60) per kilo, low quality oranges are 350,000 rials (37 cents), and the cheapest apples are 460,000 rials (49 cents).

=== Kurdistan ===
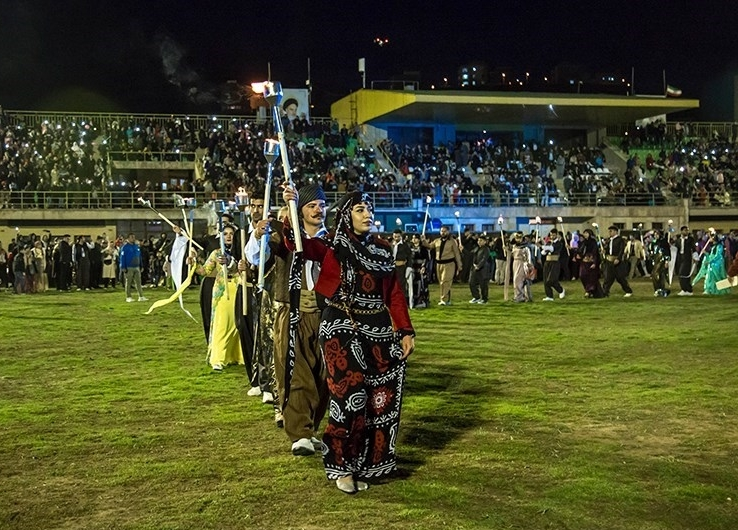
Kurds celebrating Nowruz in Sanandaj, Iran, 2019

Newroz is largely considered a potent symbol of Kurdish identity. The Kurds of Turkey celebrate this feast between 18 and 21 March. Kurds gather into fairgrounds mostly outside the cities to welcome spring. Women wear colored dresses and spangled head scarves and young men wave flags of green, yellow and red, the historic colors of Kurdish people. They hold this festival by lighting fire and dancing around it. Newroz has seen many bans in Turkey, as Turkey has a strong and long history of trying to suppress Kurdish history and culture. It has only been celebrated legally since 1992 after the ban on the Kurdish language was lifted. The holiday is now officially allowed in Turkey after international pressure on the Turkish government to lift culture bans. The Turkish government renamed the holiday Nevroz in 1995. However, Newroz celebrations are still suppressed and lead to continual confrontations with the Turkish authority. In Cizre, Nusyabin and Şırnak celebrations turned violent as Turkish police forces fired in the celebrating crowds. In recent years, the Newroz celebration summons around 1 million participants in Diyarbakır, the biggest city of the Kurdish dominated Southeastern Turkey.

In Syria, the Kurds dress up in their national dress and celebrate the New Year. Newroz has been a public holiday in Syria since 2026. Prior to the fall of the Assad regime, Syrian Kurds have had to struggle to celebrate Newroz. According to Human Rights Watch, celebration has led to violent oppression, leading to several deaths and mass arrests. The Syrian Arab Ba'athist government stated in 2004 that the Newroz celebrations will be tolerated as long as they do not become political demonstrations. During the Newroz celebrations in 2008, three Kurds were shot dead by Syrian security forces. In March 2010, an attack by Syrian police killed two or three people, one of them a 15-year-old girl, and more than 50 people were wounded. The Rojava revolution of 2012 and the subsequent establishment of the de facto Autonomous Administration of North and East Syria saw Kurdish civil rights greatly expand, and Newroz is now celebrated freely in most Kurdish areas of Syria except for Efrin, where the ritual is no longer allowed since the 2018 occupation by Turkish-backed rebel groups. Following the 2026 northeastern Syria offensive and subsequent ceasefire between the Syrian Democratic Forces and the Syrian transitional government, Syrian President Ahmed al-Sharaa issued a decree enshrining the recognition of Kurdish identity and Nowruz as a national holiday.

Kurds in Iraq and Iran have had more freedom to celebrate Newroz than their countrymen in Syria and Turkey.

Kurds in the diaspora also celebrate the New Year; for example, Kurds in Australia celebrate Newroz not only as the beginning of the new year, but also as the Kurdish National Day. Similarly, the Kurds in Finland celebrate the new year as a way of demonstrating their support for the Kurdish cause. Also in London, organizers estimated that 25,000 people celebrated Newroz during March 2006. In Canada, the largest Kurdish Newroz festival is held in Ontario. In the States, the city of Nashville, Tennessee includes the largest Kurdish population in the United States. The Kurds celebrate Newroz by holding a Nashville festival; dressed in their traditional clothing, they sing and dance around a fire with their family and friends.

=== Pakistan ===
In Pakistan, Nowruz is typically celebrated in parts of Gilgit-Baltistan, Khyber Pakhtunkhwa, especially near the border with Afghanistan, and across Balochistan, with a large celebration held in the capital of Quetta. Recently, the government of Iran has participated in hosting celebrations in Islamabad to commemorate the holiday. Like in India, the Parsi and Isma'ili communities have historically celebrated the holiday, as have some Shi'a Muslims.

=== Sweden ===
Nowruz is celebrated by the Swedish Iranian community, and in Stockholm, the Eldfesten annual festival is one of the largest Chaharshanbe Suri concerts and festivals in the world and is broadcast nationally on Sveriges Television and internationally on Manoto.

=== United States ===
Vibrant Persian-speaking immigrant communities in the United States have been celebrating Nowruz for decades. The state of California is considered to have the largest Persian-speaking community in the country. On 19 March 2024, Governor Gavin Newsom issued a proclamation declaring 19 March as Nowruz day.

== Theology ==
=== Zoroastrianism ===
Nowruz itself has its origins in Zoroastrianism and is the most important of the Zoroastrian Gahambars or religious feasts. The holiday celebrates the arrival of the spring which Zoroastrians see as a representation of the triumph of good (Asha) over evil (Druj), a central theme of the religion.

=== Bahá'í Faith ===
Naw-Rúz is one of nine holy days for adherents of the Baháʼí Faith worldwide. It is the first day of the Baháʼí calendar, occurring on the vernal equinox around 21 March. The Baháʼí calendar is composed of 19 months, each of 19 days, and each of the months is named after an attribute of God; similarly, each of the 19 days in the month also are named after an attribute of God. The first day and the first month were given the attribute of Bahá, an Arabic word meaning splendour or glory, and thus the first day of the year was the day of Bahá in the month of Bahá. Baháʼu'lláh, the founder of the Baháʼí Faith, explained that Naw-Rúz was associated with the Most Great Name of God, and was instituted as a festival for those who observed the Nineteen-Day Fast.

The day is also used to symbolize the renewal of time in each religious dispensation. ʻAbdu'l-Bahá, Bahá'u'lláh's son and successor, explained that significance of Naw-Rúz in terms of spring and the new life it brings. He explained that the equinox is a symbol of the messengers of God and the message that they proclaim is like a spiritual springtime, and that Naw-Rúz is used to commemorate it.

As with all Baháʼí holy days, there are few fixed rules for observing Naw-Rúz, and Baháʼís all over the world celebrate it as a festive day, according to local custom. Persian Baháʼís still observe many of the Iranian customs associated with Nowruz such as the Haft-sin, but American Baháʼí communities, for example, may have a potluck dinner, along with prayers and readings from Baháʼí scripture.

=== Shia Islam ===
Shia literature refers to the merits of the day of Nowruz; the Day of Ghadir took place on Nowruz; and the fatwas of major Shia scholars recommend fasting. Along with Ismailis, Alawites and Alevis, the Twelver Shia also hold the day of Nowruz in high regard.

It has been said that Musa al-Kazim, the seventh Twelver Shia imam, has explained Nowruz and said: "In Nowruz God made a covenant with His servants to worship Him and not to allow any partner for Him. To welcome His messengers and obey their rulings. This day is the first day that the fertile wind blew and the flowers on the earth appeared. The archangel Gabriel appeared to the Prophet, and it is the day that Abraham broke the idols. The day Prophet Muhammad held Ali on his shoulders to destroy the Quraishie's idols in the house of God, the Kaaba."

The day upon which Nowruz falls has been recommended as a day of fasting for Twelver Shia Muslims by Shia scholars, including Abu al-Qasim al-Khoei, Ruhollah Khomeini and Ali al-Sistani. However, Prominent Twelver clerics like the Ayatollahs Ruhollah Khomeini and Ali Khamenei have also disparaged the actual holiday of Nowruz, condemning its origins in Zoroastrianism. The day also assumes special significance for Shias as it has been said that it was on 16 March 632 AD, that the first Shia Imam, Ali, assumed the office of caliphate. Shia Imami Ismaili Muslims around the globe celebrate Nowruz as a religious festival. Special prayers and Majalis are arranged in Jamatkhanas. Special foods are cooked and people share best wishes and prayers with each other.

== In popular culture ==
Nowruz is represented and also used as theme of rebirth and renewal in the 2023 Australian film Shayda, written, directed, and co-produced by Iranian Australian filmmaker Noora Niasari.

Nowruz has also been featured in many Iranian films, such as:

- The White Balloon (Badkonake Sefid; 1995), directed by Jafar Panahi and written by Abbas Kiarostami
- The Glass Agency (1998), by Ebrahim Hatamikia
- So Close, So Far (2004), by Reza Mirkarimi
- Fireworks Wednesday (2006), by Asghar Farhadi

== See also ==
- Akitu – Spring festival in ancient Mesopotamia
- Aroos-Gooleh – Traditional drama at Nowruz in Gilan Province
- Ayeneh taudani – Mirror-throwing tradition at Nowruz
- Baháʼí Naw-Rúz – First day of the Bahá'í calendar year
- Dehwa d-Shishlam Rabba – The Mandaean "Little Nowruz"
- Dehwa Rabba – The Mandaean New Year
- Ēostre – Germanic goddess
- Holi – Indian Hindu spring festival of colours
- Kha b-Nisan – Assyrian New Year
- New Year's Day – First day of the year in the Gregorian calendar
- Pahela Baishakh – Bengali new year
- Sham Ennessim – Egyptian spring festival
- Vernal Equinox Day – One of the two Kōreisai Japanese holidays
- Yilgayakh – Spring festival of Tengrism
