= Amu Nowruz =

Character from Iranian folklore

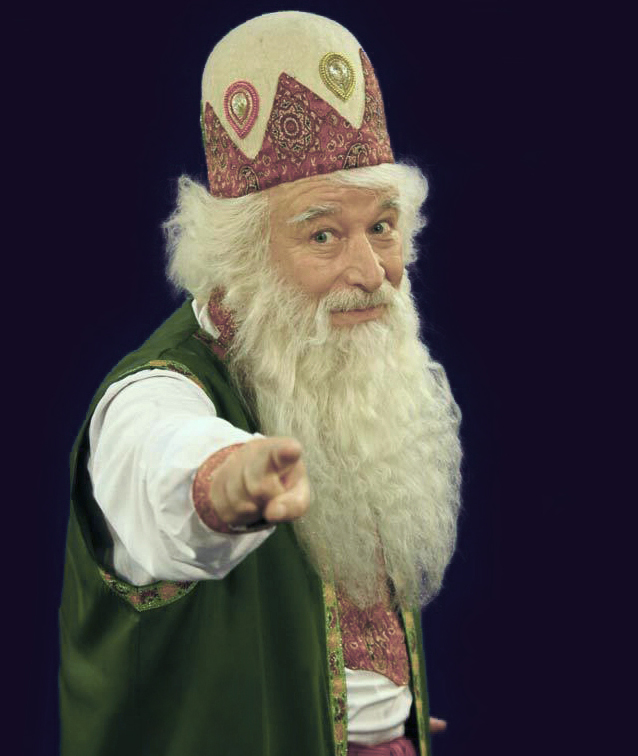
- Actor Javad Ensafi in the role of Amu Nowruz

Folk tale
- Name: Amu Nowruz
- Also known as: Uncle Nowruz; Father Nowruz
- Country: Iran
- Related: Hajji Firuz

Amu Nowruz (Persian: عمو نوروز, "Uncle Nowruz"), also known as Baba Nowruz (بابا نوروز, "Father Nowruz"), is a legendary character originating in Iranian folklore. According to the folklore, he appears annually at the beginning of spring, together with his companion Haji Firuz, to mark the beginning of Nowruz, the Iranian New Year. According to some historians he symbolizes Zal, father of Rostam, the hero of Shahnameh.

On the eve of spring equinox, when the Iranian New Year is celebrated in the Iranian cultural continent from Albania in the West to Western China in the East, Amu Nowruz brings children gifts, similar to the Western Christian folk character Santa Claus. He is the husband of Nane Sarma, who shares a traditional love story with him in which they can meet each other only once a year.

Amu Nowruz is characterized as an elderly silver-haired man who puts on a felt hat, and has a walking stick, a long cloak of blue canvas, a sash, a pair of thin-soled giveh, and a pair of linen trousers. He is a wise historical presence who passes the old story of Nowruz to the youth. Haji Firuz plays a tambourine, dances, and demands gifts, while Amu Nowruz is the giver.

== Amu Nowruz and Nane Sarma ==
The story of Amu Nowruz and Nane Sarma is one of the symbolic legends of the transition from the old year to the new year:

According to legend an old woman named Nane Sarma ("Grandma Frost") is the wife of Amu Nowruz but can only see him on this one night of the year, after which she leaves him and goes on her way until the next year.

Another version of this story says that on the first day of spring every year, Nane Sarma expects Uncle Nowruz to come and visit her, but before he comes she falls asleep from exhaustion and when she wakes up she realizes that Uncle Nowruz has come and gone. It has also been said that if the two see each other the world will be destroyed.

In another retelling, Amu Nowruz travels all around the world giving children gifts (much like Santa Claus) on his way to meet Nane Sarma, who loved him dearly. Nane Sarma would wake up early on the spring equinox to clean her house and ready her table. However, each year she falls asleep just before he arrives. The kindhearted Amu Nowruz would not wake her up; instead, he eats some of the food set out and places a flower on her new clothes. Then, he departs to continue his long journey. When dawn touches Nane Sarma's face, she awakens to realize she has missed seeing Amu Nowruz again. Each year the cycle repeats itself, and she awaits him every spring.

== See also ==
- When Kurdish cultural stories are stolen
