= Ayeneh taudani =

Mirror-throwing tradition at Nowruz

Ayeneh taudani, or mirror-throwing, is one of the Nowruz traditions in northern regions of Iran. In the last days of Esfand, the last month in the Jalali calendar, a host of the youth gather together and contribute in making a double-face square mirror decorated and framed by primroses, violets, and green sticks of Shamshad. The party waits for the night to come and after dinner time they tie the mirror to a long piece of rope. Then all of the party goes to the neighborhood and throws the mirror, which is very well-cushioned by flowers and plants, through the intentionally left-ajar door into the middle of the house with a bunch of flowers. A member of the house brings back the mirror to the party and gifts them with comfits, halva and other food stuff especially prepared for Nowruz.
