= Blackbird Bakery =

Restaurant in Bainbridge Island, Washington, U.S.

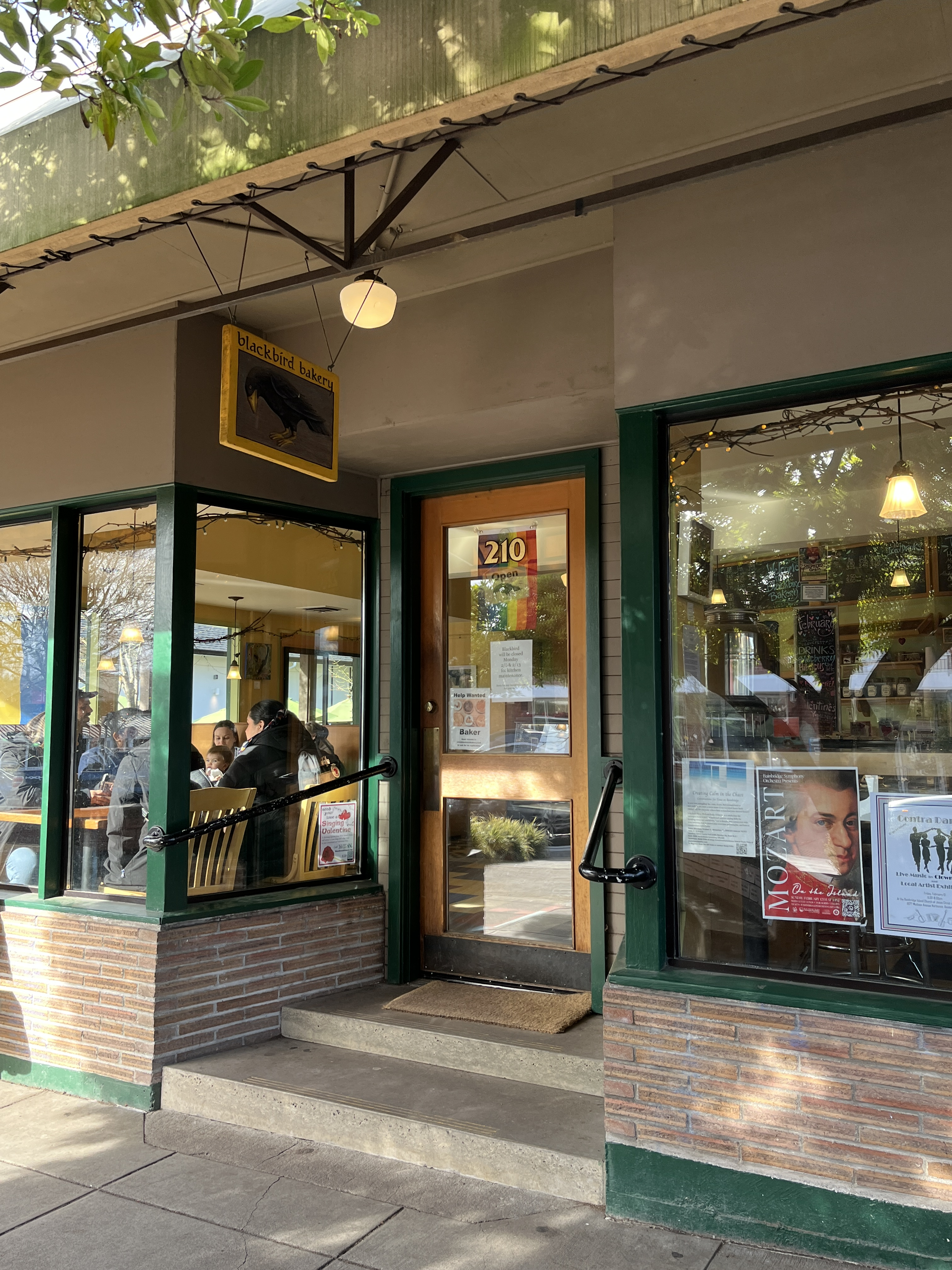
- The bakery's exterior in 2023
- Interactive map of Blackbird Bakery

Restaurant information
- Location: 210 Winslow Way East, Bainbridge Island, Washington, 98110, United States
- Coordinates: 47°37′30″N 122°31′10″W

Blackbird Bakery is a bakery on Bainbridge Island, in the U.S. state of Washington. Established in 1999, the business is owned by Jeff Shepard and Heidi Umphenour. The menu includes various pastries and desserts, as well as coffee and other drinks. Blackbird has garnered a positive reception.

== Description ==
Blackbird Bakery's shop is on Winslow Way East, on Bainbridge Island. The bakery has window seating and serves cakes, cookies, muffins, scones, pies, tarts, and other pastries and desserts, as well as quiches and soups. Blackbird also offers coffee and espresso drinks, as well as tea.

According to Seattle Metropolitan, "Downtowners, rolls of croissant dough dipped in vanilla sugar, have become a signature." The Helen's French Roll has been described as a "minimalist-chic cousin" to coffee cake. The shop serves toast with jam, and bakes various kinds of bread, including oatmeal and multigrain varieties.

== History ==
Blackbird opened in 1999. It is owned by Jeff Shepard and Heidi Umphenour, and had a "sister" establishment, Fork & Spoon, which has since closed. Umphenour's foot broke in multiple places when an oven exploded at Blackbird.

== Reception ==
Lonely Planet Seattle recommends Blackbird for food when visiting Bainbridge Island. Allison Williams and Allecia Vermillion included the business in Seattle Metropolitan's 2021 list of ten "sweet bakery day trips" from the city. In 2023, Vermillion said Blackbird "is basically the old guard in Bainbridge". The Seattle Times called the bakery "a big hit with islanders and tourists" in 2022.

Frommer's has called Blackbird's cookies and pastries "good". Northwest Travel & Life has recommended the Brioche Cinnamon Roll, and Seattle Magazine has recommended the quiches. In 2024, Aimee Rizzo and Kayla Sager-Riley of The Infatuation called the Helen's French Roll among the best pastries in the Puget Sound region, and said the blueberry scone with a lemon glaze "is also a non-negotiable".

== See also ==
- List of bakeries
