= Orem-orem =

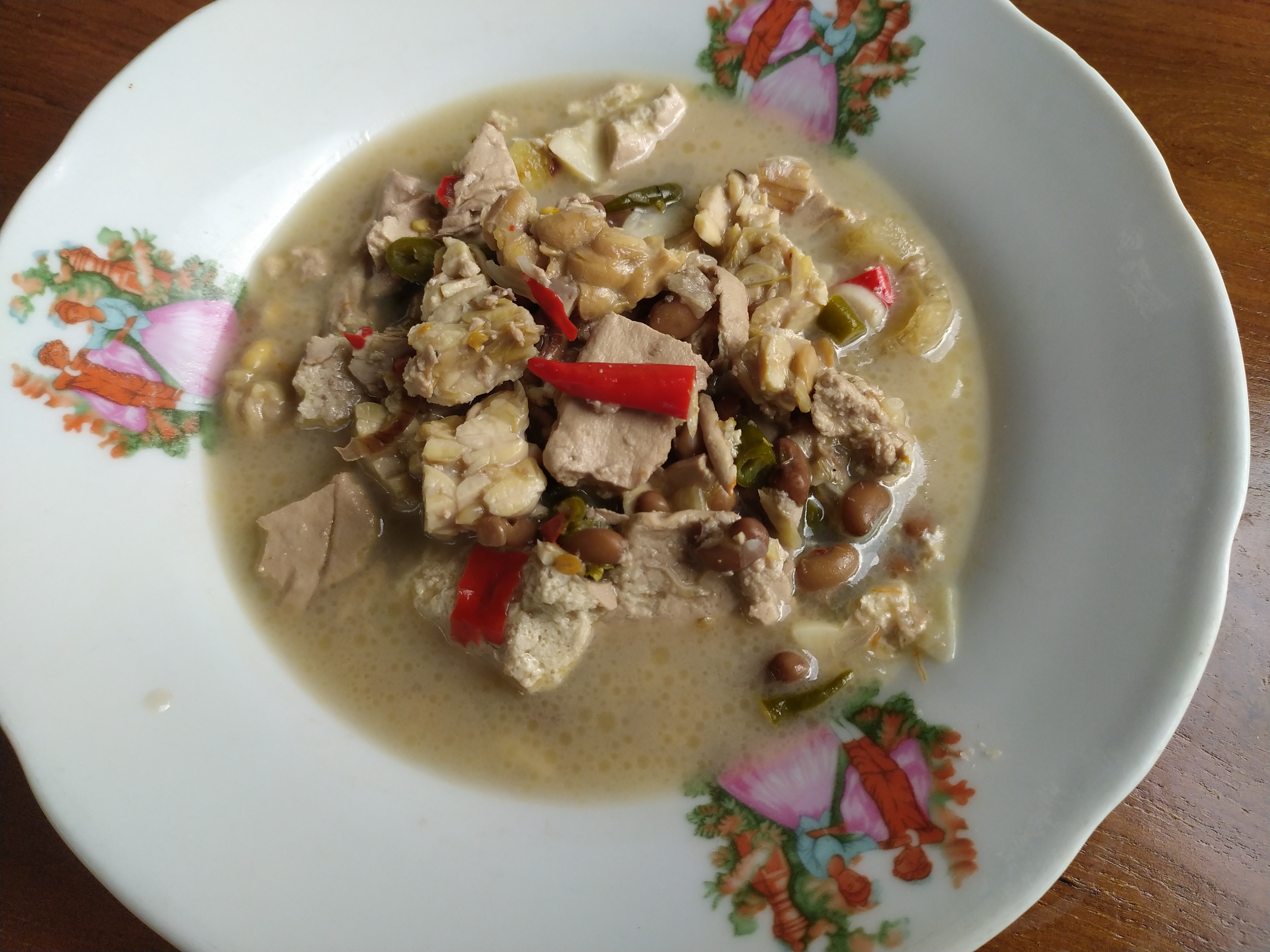
- Orem-orem
- Place of origin: Indonesia
- Region or state: Malang City (East Java)
- Created by: Art Javanese cuisine
- Main ingredients: tempeh fried, chicken, thick coconut milk sauce, ketupat sliced, bean sprouts

Orem-orem is a Javanese dish from Malang City made from fried tempeh slices, chicken, and cooked in thick coconut milk sauce. It is served with sliced ketupat topped with bean sprouts, tempeh, and a coconut milk vegetable sauce. The taste of orem-orem sauce is similar to lodeh vegetables with a slightly spicy taste, and can be added with sweet soy sauce and chili sauce to taste. This dish is typical of Malang City, East Java. This food is quite pocket-friendly with a price tag of IDR. 8,000 - IDR. 12,000 per portion.

== Description ==
Orem-orem used to be served only at celebratory events such as weddings and thanksgivings in Malang. However, since the 1980s, orem-orem dishes can also be purchased at traditional stalls and even from street vendors. Malang is known for its signature tempeh dish, "Tempe khas Malang" or "kripik tempeh." It is from this basic ingredient that orem-orem has become popular.

Orem-orem is a dish made from fried slices of tempeh typical of Malang, chicken, and cooked in thick coconut milk sauce. It is served with sliced ketupat topped with bean sprouts, tempeh, and a coconut milk vegetable sauce. Orem-orem sauce is similar to sayur lodeh but thick and with a slightly spicy taste. Usually, sweet soy sauce or chili sauce can be added to taste.

What makes orem-orem unique is the way it's cooked, using charcoal as fuel, because the embers don't alter the aroma of the base spices. Orem-orem can only be found in Malang, as it's made from Malang-style tempeh and local Malang spices.
