= Spindly growth =

Spindly growth, also known as leggy growth, is a term used when two plants compete for sunlight and nutrients in order to develop.

== Causes ==
Spindly growth occurs when one plant receives a great amount of sunlight, while the other would develop as a deformed one, due to lack of sunlight and other natural resources needed for photosynthesis. Another reason includes the fact that the sprout has been left under an artificial light source for more than 12 to 16 hours (the recommended amount to keep the plant under), overwatering, and excessive addition of fertilizer.

== Solutions ==
- After germination, transport plants to an area with a temperature of 60–70 °F (16–21 °C).
- Keep under light for at least 12 hours a day.
- Plant seeds 6 inches (15 centimetres) apart to prevent crowding.
- Remove deceased plants to promote growth for newly planted ones.
