= Germinated wheat =

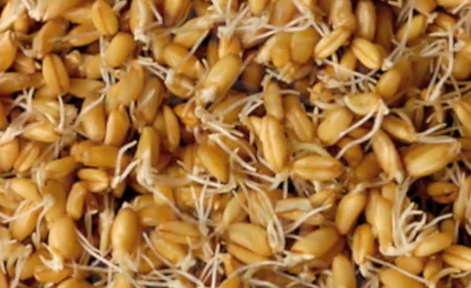
Germinated wheat

Germinated wheat (Persian: جوانه‌ گندم) or sprouted wheat, wheat sprout is a product of germinating wheat seeds in a wet and relatively warm environment in a process called sprouting. It is sometimes used instead of barley in the form of malt (early stage sprout) for making beer.

It is used in numerous Persian pastries, dishes, and desserts. Also, it has been used traditionally in the New Year celebration's Haft-Seen table decoration, in the form of Sabzeh (wheat grass), and a dessert called Samanu, as symbols of blessings from Ahura-Mazda. This custom has been observed by most of the people on Iranian Plateau and some of the populations in beyond (e.g. some parts of India, Yemen, Lebanon, Russia, and China) for thousands of years maybe as old as emerging of Zoroaster.

One of the confections called Sohan is made up of mainly wheat sprout flour. It is a traditional Persian saffron brittle toffee and made in the holy city of Qom.

== Samani ==
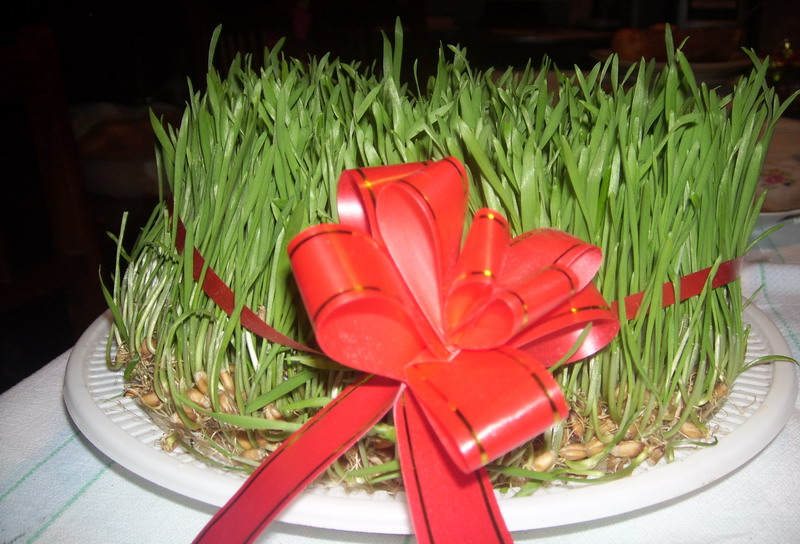

In Azerbaijan, the growing of samani (Azerbaijani: səməni) – green sprouting wheat – is the most sacred Novruz ceremony as the herald of spring. Sprouting samani symbolises sowing and a rich harvest, it represents grain, bread, increase and abundance. Grain and abundance is a pledge of life, existence, the most vital material necessity for life. People have always grown samani from wheat, barley, peas, lentils or other grains in copper dishes; they have always revered it and rejoiced at its sprouting.

The Azerbaijani proverb "Səməni, ay səməni, hər il göyərdərəm səni" ("samani, O samani, I try to make you grow every year") refers to the annual renewal of nature.

== See also ==
- Germinated brown rice
- Wheatgrass
