= Microgreen =

Vegetable greens harvested shortly after sprouting

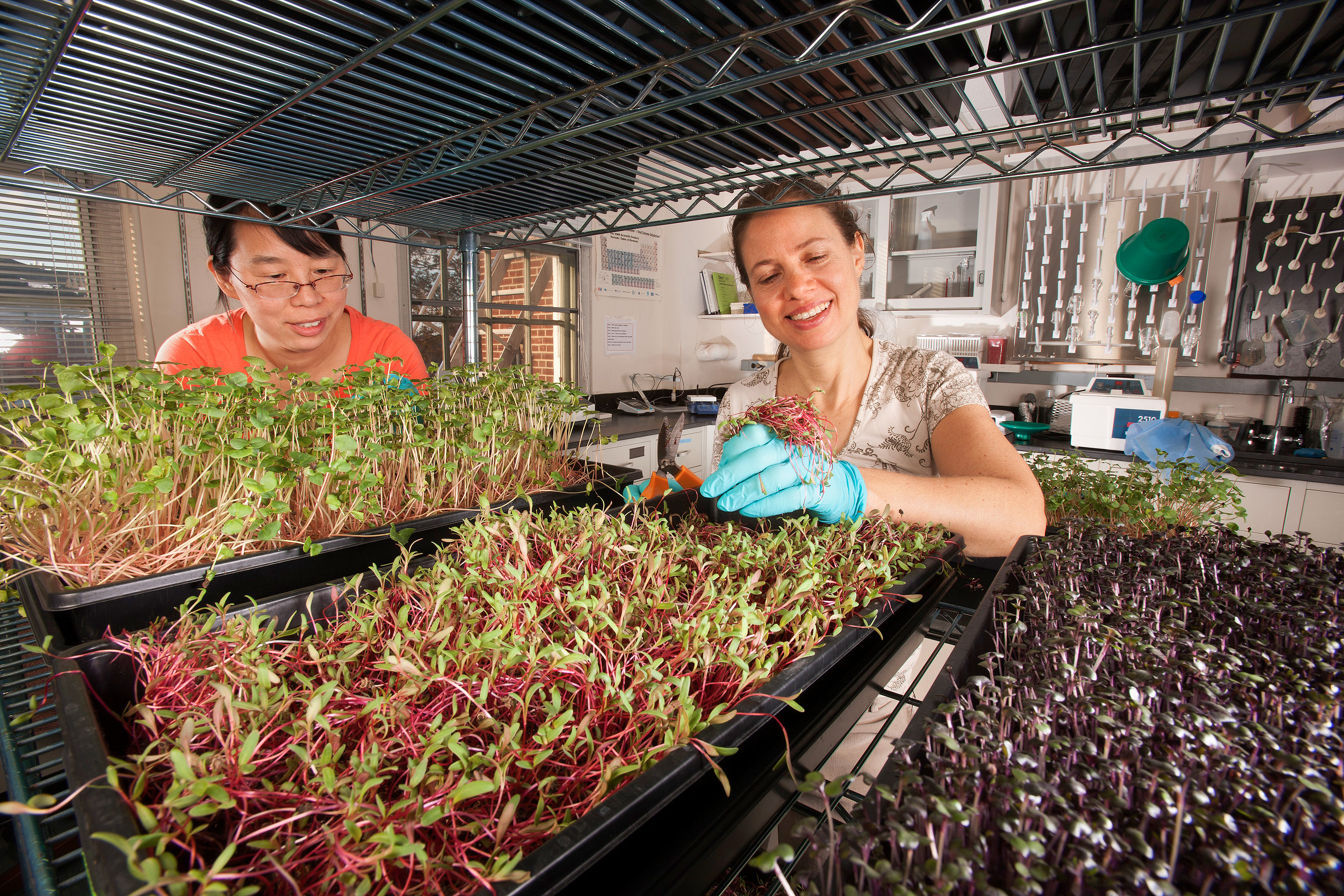
Technicians harvesting different types of microgreens for shelf-life studies and nutrient analyses

Microgreens are vegetable greens (not to be confused with sprouts or shoots) harvested just after the cotyledon leaves have developed with one set of true leaves. They are used as a visual, flavor and texture enhancement.

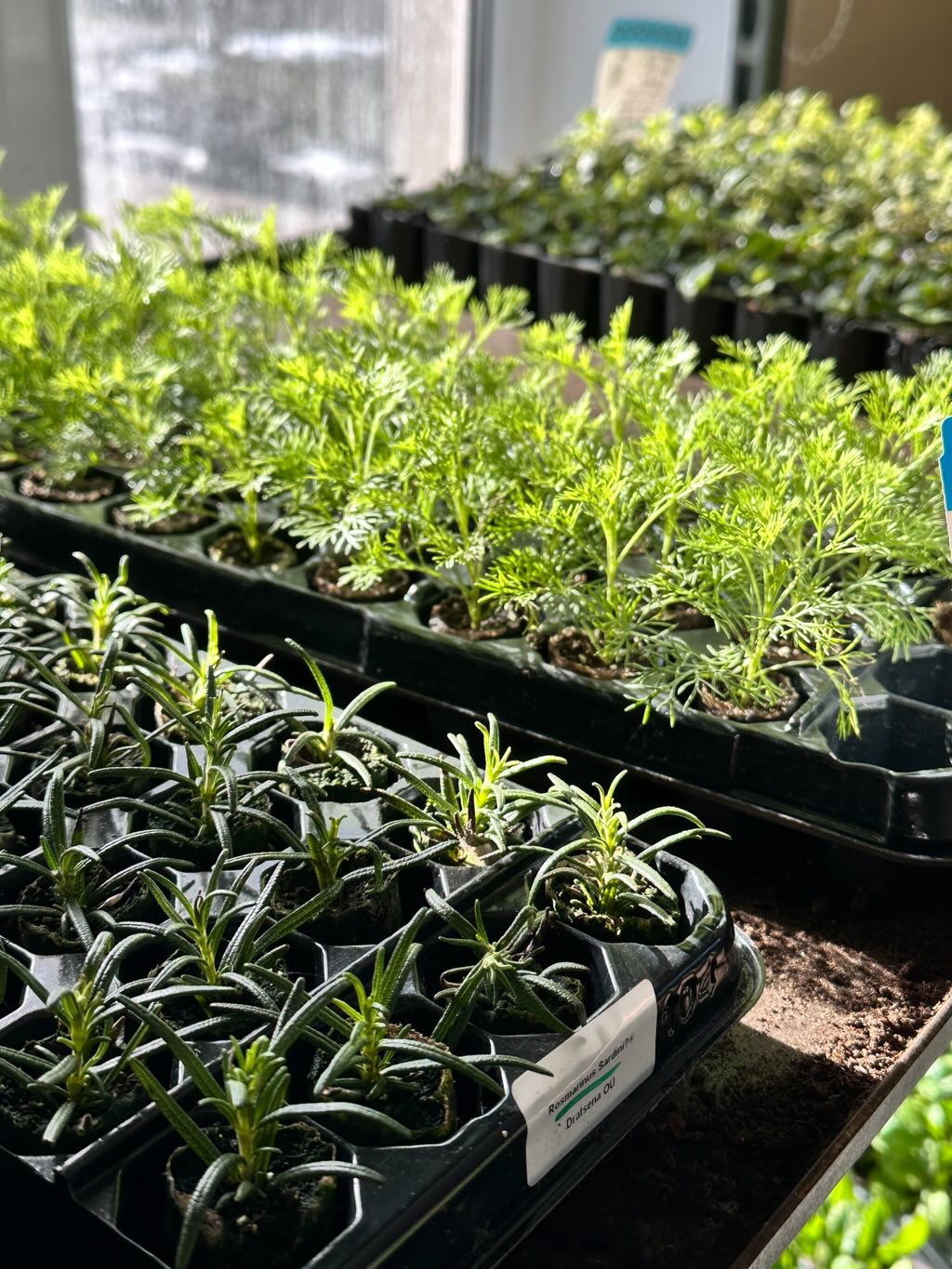

Microgreens are used to add sweetness and spiciness to foods. Microgreens are smaller than "baby greens" because they are harvested soon after sprouting, rather than after the plant has matured to produce multiple leaves.

They provide garnishing for salads, soups, sandwiches, and plates. Some recipes use them as a garnish while others use them as a main ingredient.

Edible young greens are produced from various kinds of vegetables, herbs, or other plants. They range in size from 1 to 3 inches (2.5 to 7.6 cm), including the stem and leaves. The stem is cut just above the soil line during harvesting. Microgreens have fully developed cotyledon leaves and usually, one pair of small, partially developed true leaves.

== History ==
Microgreens began showing up on chefs' menus as early as the 1980s in San Francisco. In Southern California, microgreens have been grown since the mid‑1990s. Initially, a few varieties were offered; those available were: arugula, basil, beets, kale, cilantro, and a colorful mixture of those called a "Rainbow Mix". Having spread eastward from California, they are now being grown in most areas of the United States, with an increasing number of varieties. Today, the U.S. industry for microgreens consists of a variety of seed companies and growers.

== Form ==
Microgreens have three basic parts: a central stem, cotyledon leaf or leaves, and typically, the first pair of very young true leaves. They vary in size depending upon the specific variety grown, with the typical size being 1 to 1.5 in (25 to 38 mm) in total length. When the plant grows beyond this size, it is generally no longer considered a microgreen, instead being called a petite green. The average crop-time for fast-growing microgreens, such as many brassicas, is 10–14 days from seeding to harvest. Slower growing microgreens, such as beets, chard, and many herbs, may take 16–25 days to reach harvestable size. Both baby greens and microgreens lack any legal definition. The terms "baby greens" and "microgreens" are marketing terms used to describe their respective categories. Sprouts are germinated seeds and are typically consumed as an entire plant (root, seed, and shoot), depending on the species. Sprouts from almond, pumpkin, and peanut reportedly have a better flavor when harvested prior to root developments. Sprouts are legally defined and have additional regulations concerning their production and marketing due to their relatively high risk of microbial contamination compared to other greens. Growers interested in producing sprouts for sale must be aware of the risks and precautions summarized in the FDA publication Guidance for Industry: Reducing Microbial Food Safety Hazards for Sprouted Seeds (FDA 1999).

== Growing ==
Microgreens are generally described as being an easier plant to grow but may have complication ranging from preventing and managing fungus or mold growth to providing the right nutrients and growing media to the plants in order to ensure quality produce. Many small "backyard" growers have sprung up selling their greens at farmers markets or to restaurants. A shallow plastic container with drainage holes, such as a nursery flat or prepackaged-salad box, will facilitate sprouting and grow out on a small scale. However, for commercial scale growing, specific trays better suited to growing and supporting microgreens are used.

Growing and marketing high-quality microgreens commercially is more intensive, but also shows potential for providing better quality produce under controlled and sterile environments and could provide local communities with better nutritional diversity at scale. Artificial lighting is not necessarily needed for growing microgreens but is required for indoor commercial setups. Microgreens can grow under various lighting conditions, including indirect natural light and grow lights, but some source of light is necessary for them to have grown adequately enough for harvest. Different lighting conditions can change the flavors of the microgreens being grown. For instance, corn microgreens are sweet when grown in the dark, but become bitter when exposed to light due to photosynthesis processes taking place in the sprouting plants.

Light-emitting diodes, otherwise known as LEDs, now provide the ability to measure impacts of narrow-band wavelengths of light on seedling physiology. The carotenoid zeaxanthin has been hypothesized to be a blue light receptor in plant physiology. A study was carried out to measure the impact of short-duration blue light on phytochemical compounds, which impart the nutritional quality of sprouting broccoli microgreens. Broccoli microgreens were grown in a controlled environment under LEDs using growing pads. Short-duration blue light acted to increase important phytochemical compounds influencing the nutritional value of broccoli microgreens.

Nightshade family plants such as potatoes, tomatoes, eggplants, and peppers should not be grown and consumed as microgreens, since nightshade plant sprouts are poisonous. These sprouts contain toxic alkaloids such as solanine and tropanes, which can cause adverse symptoms in the digestive and nervous systems.

== Nutritional analysis ==
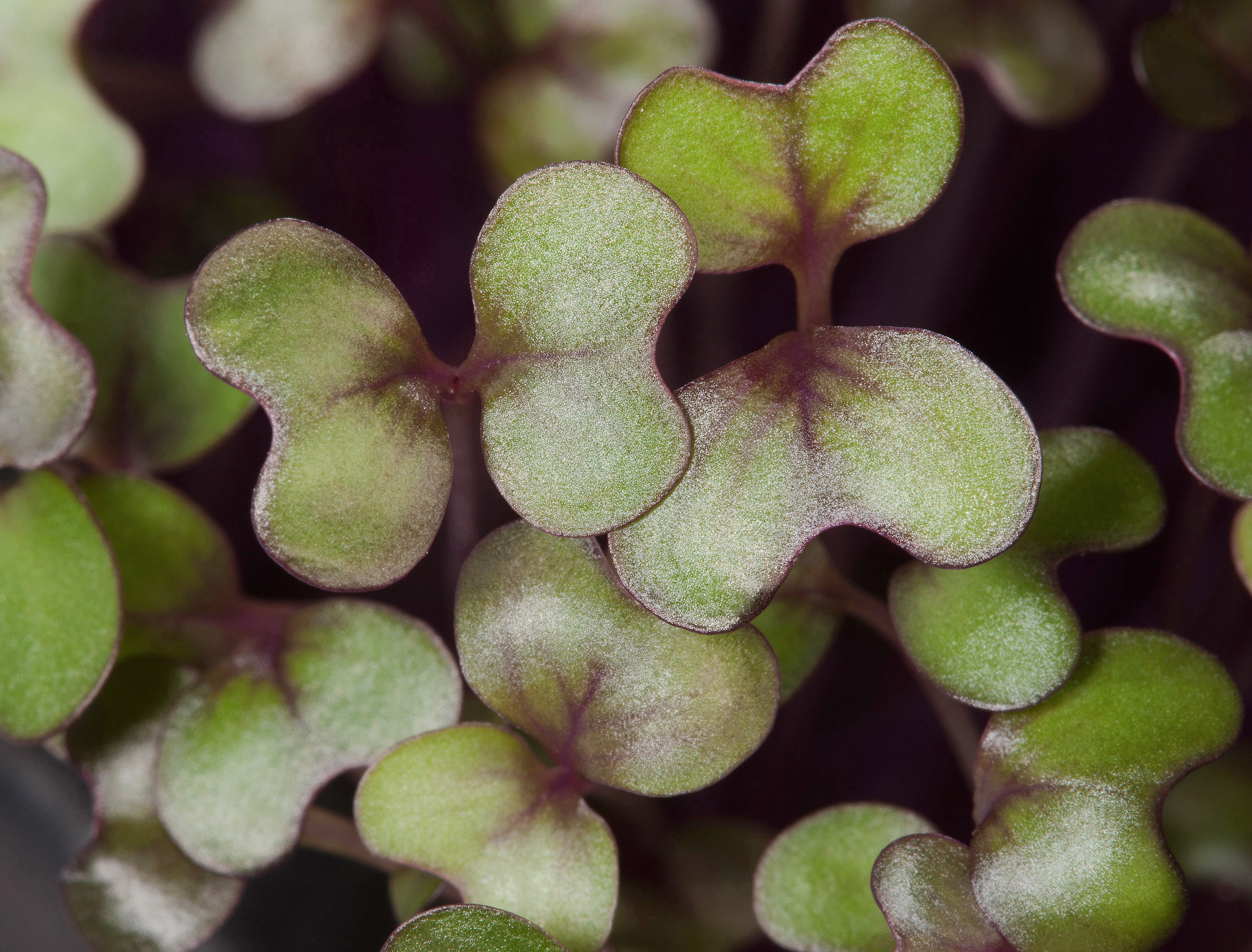
ARS scientists analyzed key nutrients in twenty-five different varieties of microgreens and found that red cabbage microgreens (shown here) had the highest concentrations of vitamin C and these nutritious microgreens are ready to harvest just ten days after sowing.

Researchers at the USDA Agricultural Research Service have published, as of early 2014, several studies that identify the nutritional make-up and the shelf life of microgreens. Twenty-five varieties were tested, with the key nutrients measured being ascorbic acid (vitamin C), tocopherols (vitamin E), phylloquinone (vitamin K), and beta-carotene (a vitamin A precursor), plus other related carotenoids in the cotyledons.

Among the 25 microgreens tested, red cabbage, cilantro, garnet amaranth, and green daikon radish had the highest concentrations of vitamin C, carotenoids, vitamin K, and vitamin E, respectively. In general, microgreens contained considerably higher levels of vitamins and carotenoids—about five times greater—than their mature plant counterparts.

== Comparison of microgreens to sprouts ==
Sprouts are germinated or partially germinated seeds. A sprout consists of the seed, root, and stem, while microgreens are harvested without the roots.

Microgreens have stronger flavors compared to sprouts, and come in a wider selection of leaf shapes, textures, and colors.

Microgreens are grown in soil or soil-like materials such as peat moss. Microgreens require high light levels, preferably natural sunlight with low humidity and good air circulation. Microgreens are planted with very low seed density compared to sprout processing. Crop times are generally one to two weeks for most varieties, although some can take four to six weeks. Microgreens are ready to harvest when the cotyledons are fully expanded. Harvesting is usually with scissors cutting just above the soil surface, excluding any roots. Some growers sell them while still growing, rooted in the growing trays so that they may be cut later. Once removed from their growing environment, these trays of microgreens must be used quickly, or they will rapidly begin to elongate and lose color and flavor.

Sprout seeds are soaked in water, usually for eight hours, and then drained. A high density of seed is placed inside of sprouting equipment or enclosed containers. The seed germinates rapidly due to the high moisture and humidity levels maintained in the enclosures. Seeds can also be sprouted in cloth bags that are repeatedly soaked in water. The sprouting process occurs in dark or very low light conditions. After a few days of soaking and repeated rinsing in water (several times a day to minimize spoilage), the processing is complete, and the sprouts are ready to consume.

The conditions that are ideal for properly grown microgreens do not encourage the growth of dangerous pathogens. These growing methods would not work for the production of sprouts.

However, the potential for food safety issues with microgreens may be increasing due to the number of indoor microgreen growing operations in which excessive seed density, low light intensity, low air circulation, or most commonly, a lack of GAP (good agricultural practices) and GMP (good manufacturing practices) based food safety procedures. Certain provisions of the Guidance for Industry: Reducing Microbial Food Safety Hazards For Sprouted Seeds may be beneficial and prudent for growers of microgreens to follow. Also, not all plants can be grown as microgreens due to toxicity concerns. For instance, nightshade plants (eggplants, tomatoes, potatoes, peppers, etc.) should not be grown as microgreen sprouts, since nightshade sprouts are toxic.

== Storage and commercial transport ==
Microgreens have a long shelf life if stored and packaged properly. Optimal methods of storing and transporting microgreens are currently being studied. Commercial microgreens are most often stored in plastic clamshell containers, which do not provide the right balance of oxygen and carbon dioxide for live greens to breathe. This is why microgreens are normally sold cut and packaged in a non breathable container. When freshly cut the shelf life for microgreens can be several weeks. Some growers add a food safe moisture wicking material in the bottom of the container to extend shelf life. Moisture control and temperature are the two most important factors when considering the longevity of packaged microgreens and their transport.

The ARS researchers found that buckwheat microgreens packaged in films with an oxygen transmission rate of 225 cubic centimeters per square inch per day had a fresher appearance and better cell membrane integrity than those packaged in other films tested. Following these steps, the team maintained acceptable buckwheat microgreen quality for more than fourteen days—a significant extension, according to authors. This study was published in LWT-Food Science and Technology in 2013.
