= Pulse drip irrigation =

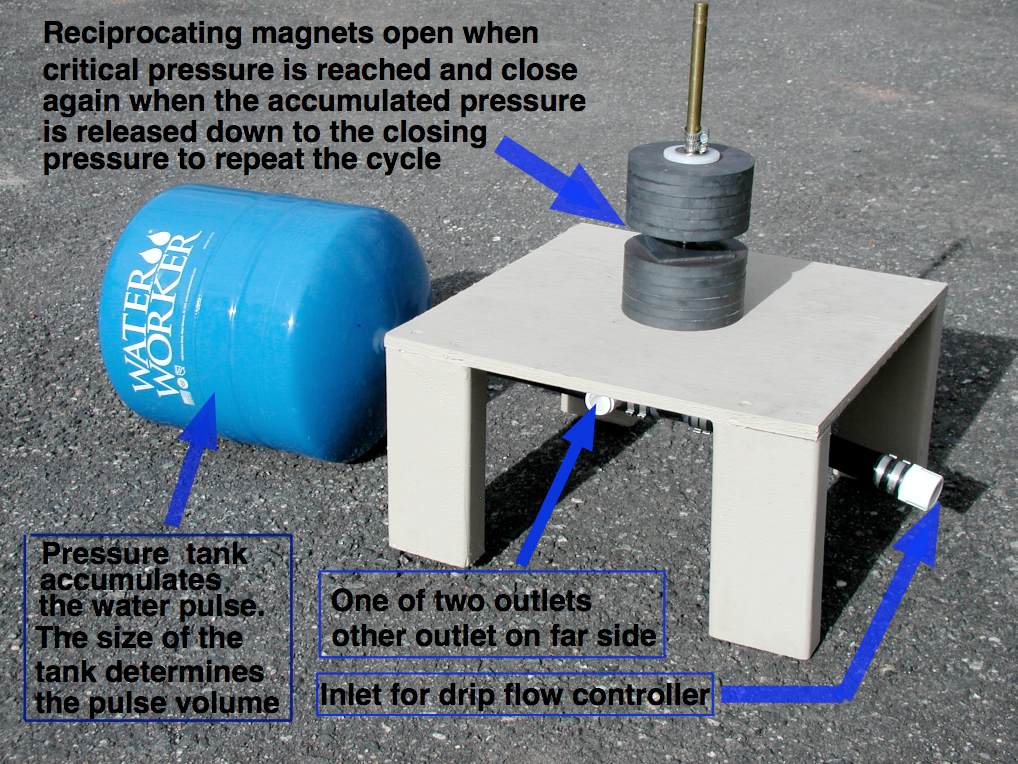
Illustration of a pulse drip irrigation system. Magnets hold the valve closed while water comes in through the inlet and drip flow controller to charge the reservoir. When the building pressure finally overcomes the attractive force of the magnets the top set of magnets are forced upward to open the valve. As the water is released, the pressure decreases to a point where the magnets drop back down and the charging phase begins anew.

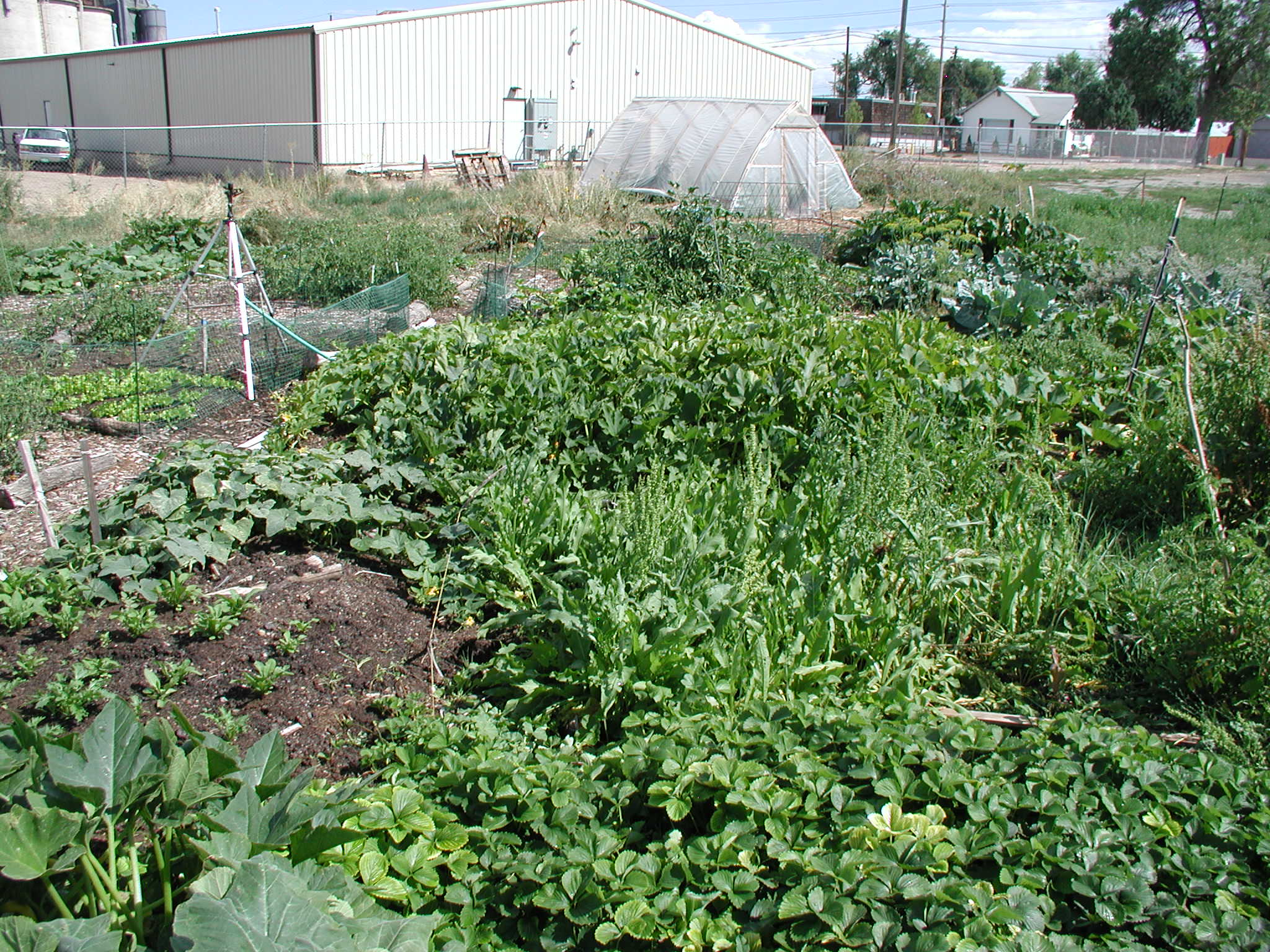
One of two pulsing impact sprinkler at The Crescent Grange in Broomfield, Colorado providing 5,000 square feet (460 m^{2}) of coverage of their permaculture garden. The sprinklers were run continuously, delivering 5-second pulses per minute for the first twelve days to germinate the seeds. Thereafter, it was gradually cut back to 8- to 10-hour watering periods three times a week.

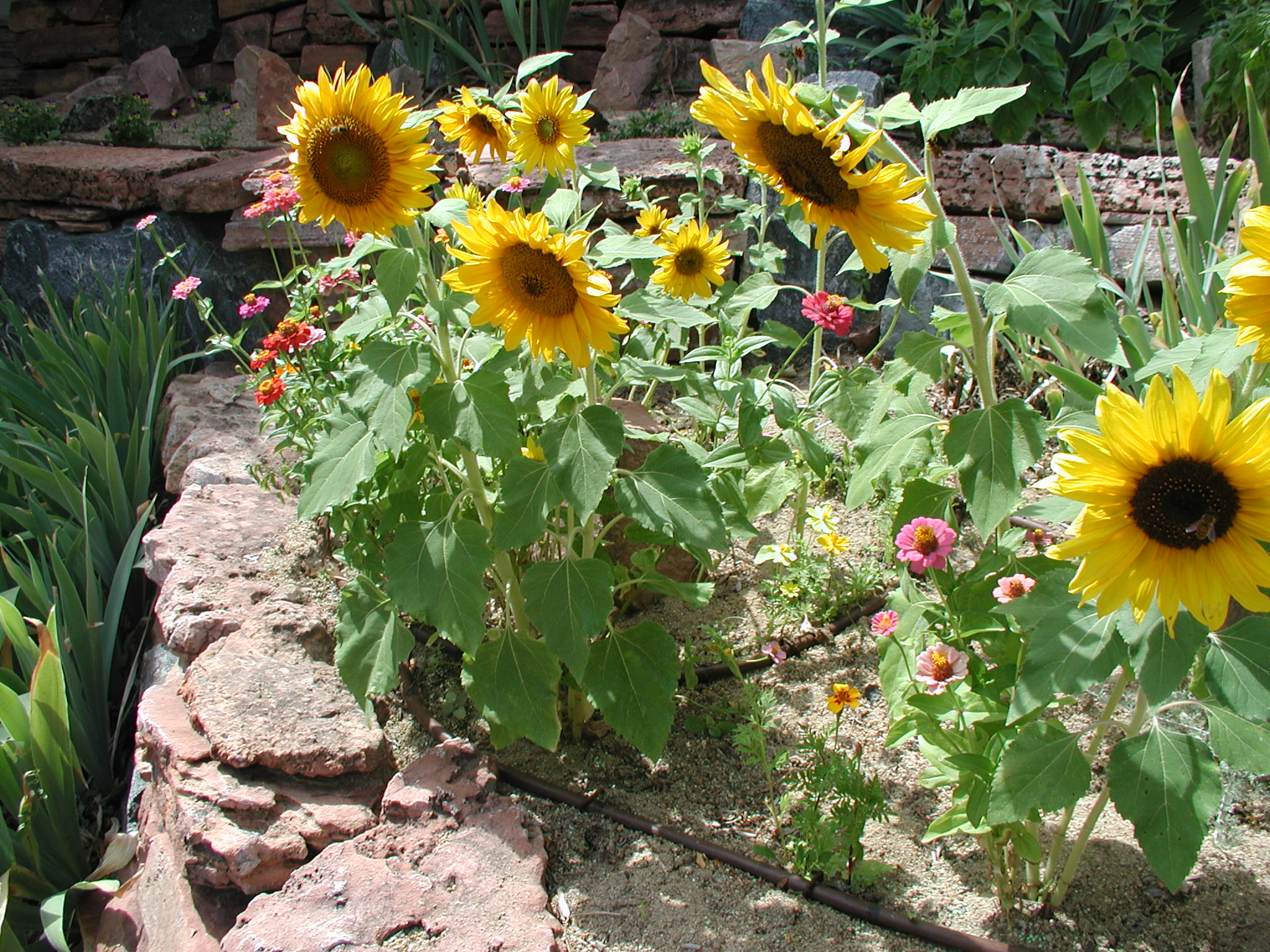
Landscaping in sand with in situ seed germination. A one-US-gallon-per-hour (3.8 L) drip flow controller feeding an 82-foot-long (25 m) drip line with check valves comprising 82 drip points along its length so each drip point is putting out about 1/82 US gallon (46 mL) per hour.

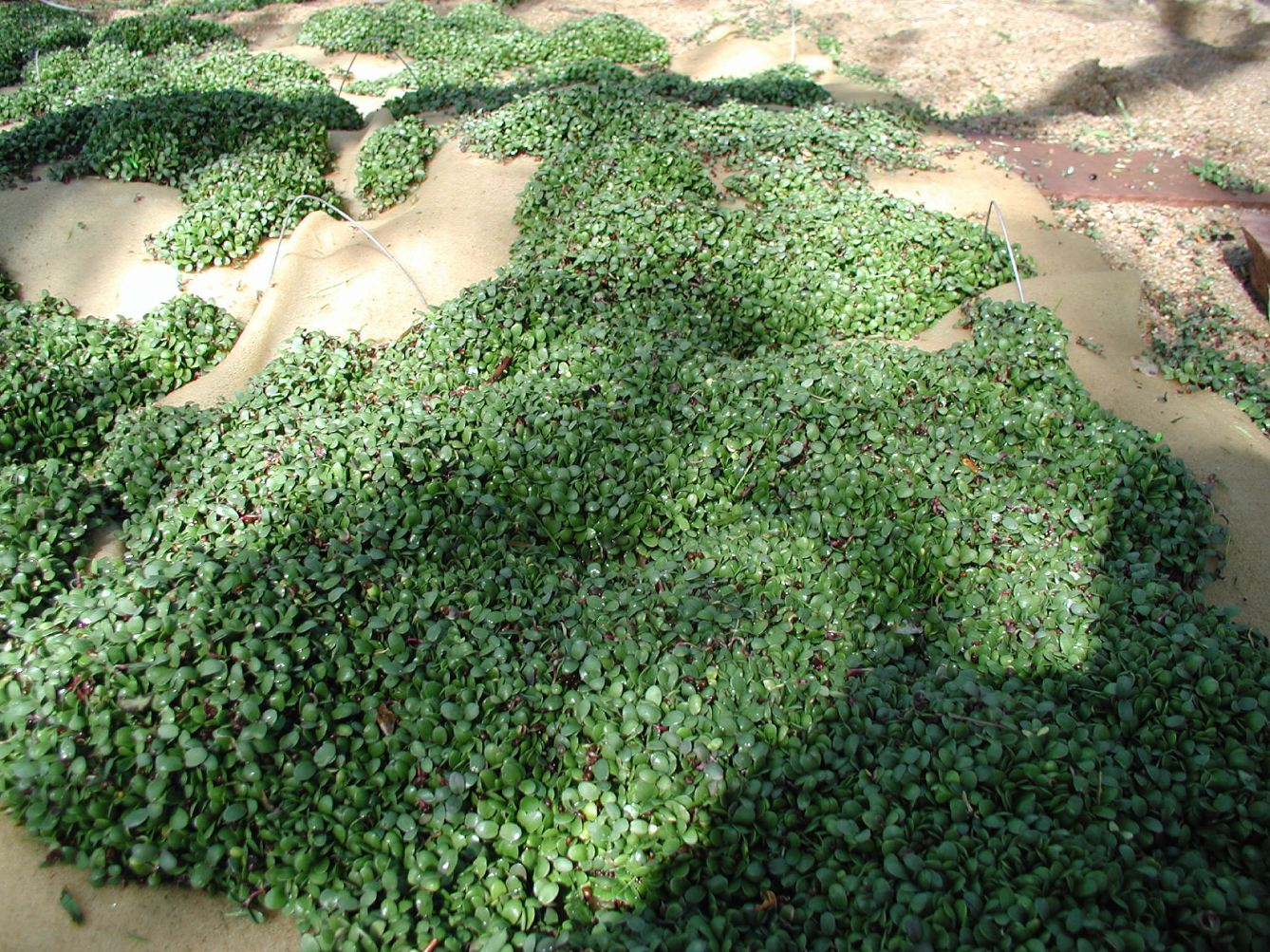
Crimson clover sprouts grown on 1/8-inch (0.32 cm) urethane foam mats and flagstone. Four micro-sprinklers cycle pulsing continuously over a 7-day period, each putting out about 1/2 US gallon (1.9 L) per hour. The four micro-sprinklers were each fitted with an LPD to keep the lines fully charged between pulses.

Pulse drip irrigation is an experimental irrigation technique primarily used with drip irrigation. Maintaining a high level of soil moisture for germination of seed is one reason this technique may be used.

Most conventional drip irrigation systems can be made to pulse by using a timer to reduce the watering duration and increase the watering frequency. Some newer systems have been developed that utilize a pressurized reservoir. When the pressure in the reservoir reaches some predetermined pressure level the valve on the reservoir opens and a portion of the fluid contained within the reservoir is forcefully discharged. While the fluid is discharging, the pressure within the reservoir decreases. When the decrease in water pressure reaches a predetermined level the valve closes to resume the charging phase. The charge-discharge cycling will continue as long as the flow rate coming in through the inlet is less than the expel rate passing out through the outlets while the valve is open. A device called a drip flow controller is placed at the inlet for this purpose to regulate the flow into the inlet.

If properly designed and operated, a low-flow pulse system may be left operating continuously for a period of time without overwatering. Constant and frequent irrigation applications have been cited as one way to reduce water demand. Some literature also cite the benefits of small frequent watering applications to reduce water stress on plants.

Low-flow application rates can be used with different soils and growth media. The water can be applied slowly enough to match the water infiltration rate and prevent water loss from deep percolation or runoff. Mineral nutrients added to media with a high void content, such as coarse grained sand, will provide more oxygen to roots than ordinary soil and share some of the advantages with aeroponics. Sand also has a low water retention potential that makes it easier for plants to extract water by expending less energy due to the sand's relatively large particle size, which consequently does not bind very well to water. This increases the plant's water-use efficiency. Sand is also less hospitable to pathogens that can attack roots.

== Advantages ==
Pulse drip irrigation has the following advantages:

- Less run off on heavy soils.
- Less leaching or water loss in sandy soils.
- Water can be applied more efficiently on shallow soils and in hilly areas.
- Intermittent operation of sprinklers and foggers can provide evaporative cooling for temperature control.
- Size of growing containers in greenhouses may be reduced due to very low discharge rates.
- Low flow inputs may reduce supply system costs because smaller pipes and lower capacity pumps would be needed.

== Disadvantages ==
- The additional expense of buying and maintaining a pulse drip system to a pre-existing irrigation system.
- The system requires a minimum of 170 kPa (25 psi) water pressure to run efficiently.
- Maintaining the integrity of a pressurized water supply is of critical importance. Leaks in the piping can run up substantial costs due to the long duration of the watering periods.
- Close attention to the watering cycles is needed to avoid salt build up in the soil. Light watering can leave salt residues behind as the water evaporates and leave little added moisture to the soil.
- The additional expense of leak prevention devices (LPDs) or check valves are recommended to be fitted at each watering distribution point along the system to ensure even distribution of water. If the lines are allowed to drain between pulses, most of the water will preferentially flow to those at the beginning of the line.

== See also ==
- Drip irrigation
- Drip tape
