= Sprouted bread =

Type of bread

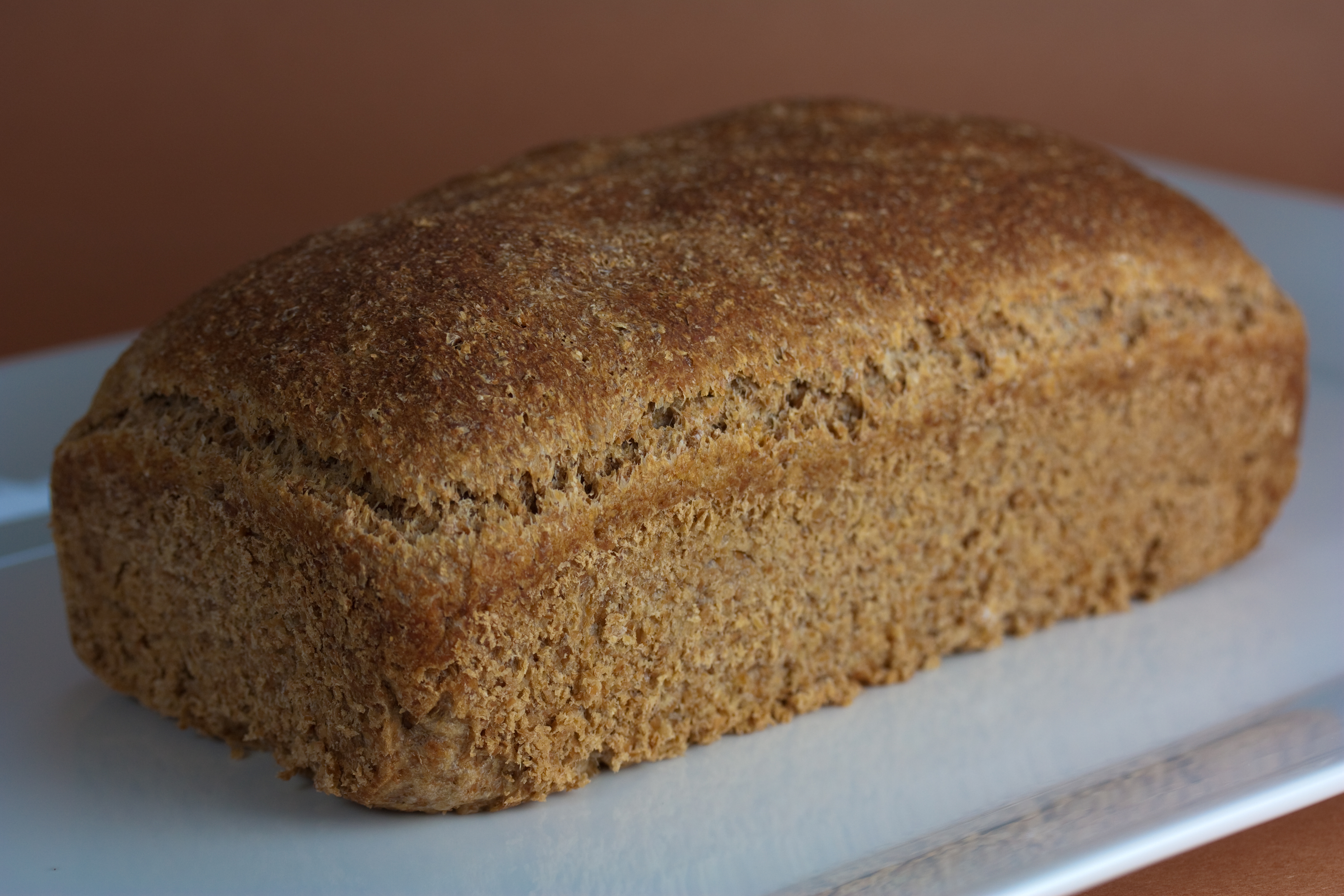
- Vegan flourless sprouted wheat bread.
- Type: Bread
- Main ingredients: Whole grains (sprouted)

Sprouted bread is a type of bread made from whole grains that have been allowed to sprout (germinate) before being milled into flour.

Although sprouted breads like Essene bread (named after the Essenes) and Ezekiel bread (named after an ancient bread recipe found in the Bible in Ezekiel 4:9)) contain few ingredients other than milled sprouted grain and water, some sprouted breads are made with added flour or gluten.

== Overview ==
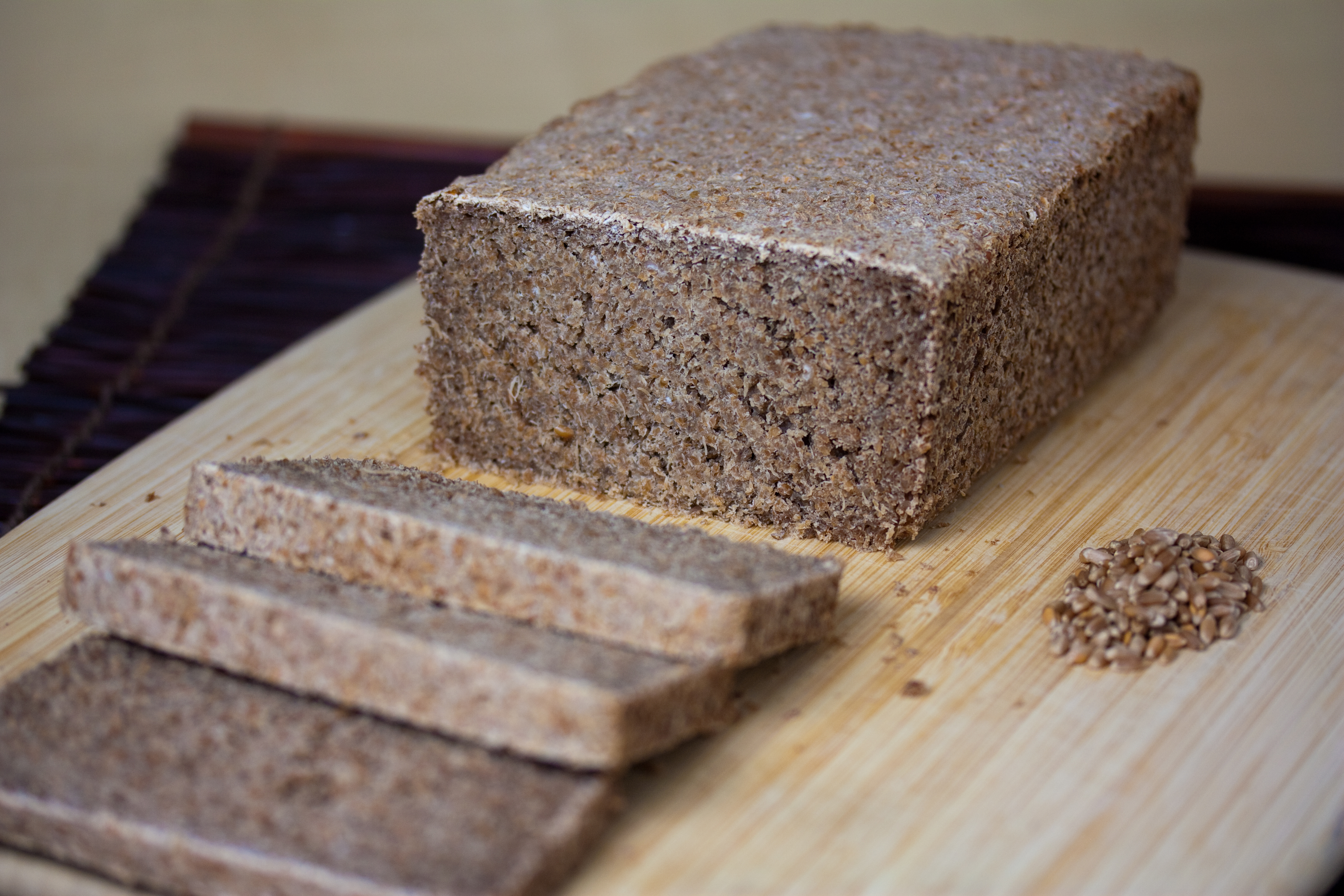
Sprouted wild-yeasted whole wheat bread.

Sprouted breads contain the whole, sprouted grain (the kernel, or berry) of various seeds. They are different from white bread inasmuch as white breads are made from ground wheat endosperm (after removal of the bran and germ). Whole grain breads include the bran, germ, and endosperm, therefore providing more naturally occurring fiber, vitamins and proteins. Sprouted (or germinated) grain breads have roughly the same amount of vitamins per gram, and 47% less gluten than regular bread.

A comparison of nutritional analyses shows that sprouted grains contain about 75% of the carbohydrates, slightly higher protein and about 40% of the fat when compared to whole grains.

In addition to wheat, sprouted breads may contain grains and legumes, such as millet, barley, oat, lentil and soy. Bread that is made from an array of grains and legumes can provide a complete set of amino acids, the building blocks of proteins. Sprouted breads may contain slightly more trace minerals and nutrients than non-sprouted breads. Other than that, they supply much the same advantages as whole grain breads over refined grain breads, such as lowered risk of coronary heart disease.

== Essene bread ==
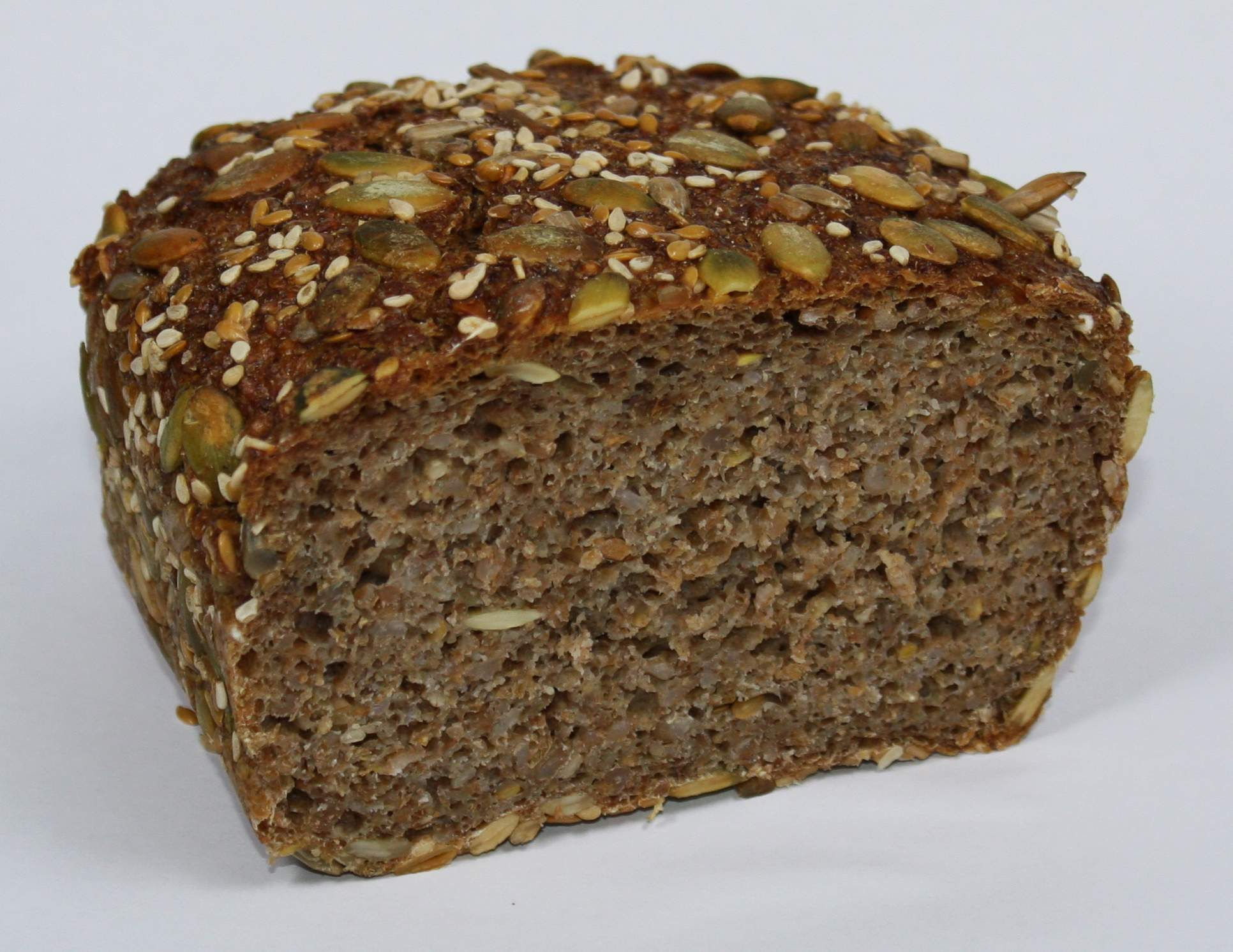
A loaf of Essene bread made from 70% sprouted rye and 30% whole-grain spelt.

Essene bread is a simple form of sprouted grain bread made from sprouted wheat and prepared at a low temperature. Proponents of raw foods often eat it uncooked or slightly heated. The Essenes, an ascetic Jewish sect that flourished from the second century BC through the first century AD, are credited with the technique and basic recipe for Essene bread despite a dearth of scholarly evidence for the claim. Sprouting and low-temperature preparation ensures the maximum possible vitamin content for the foodstuff. Sprouting also breaks down the lectins and other substances that some individuals may be sensitive or allergic to.

== See also ==
- Health food
- List of breads
- Malt
- Malt loaf
- Multigrain bread
- Wheatberry, a whole-wheat kernel before sprouting
