= Germinated brown rice =

Type of unpolished rice

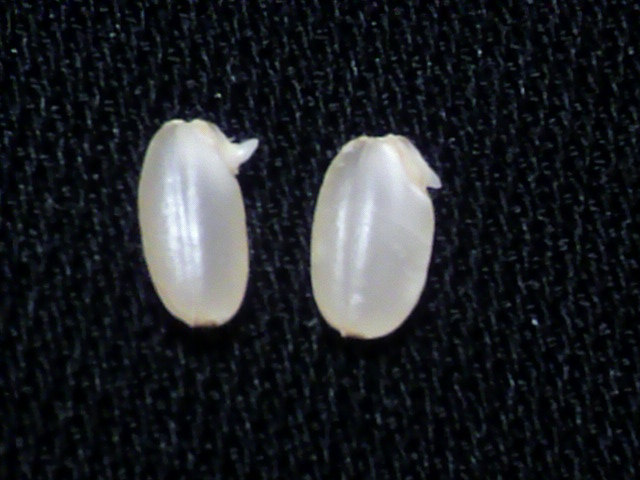

Korean name
- Hangul: 발아 현미
- Hanja: 發芽玄米
Transcriptions
- Revised Romanization: bara hyeonmi
- McCune–Reischauer: para hyŏnmi

Japanese name
- Kanji: 発芽玄米
- Hiragana: はつがげんまい
Transcriptions
- Revised Hepburn: hatsuga genmai

Germinated brown rice (GBR; Korean: 발아 현미; Japanese: 発芽玄米) is unpolished brown rice that has been allowed to germinate to improve the flavor and texture, and to increase levels of nutrients such as GABA (γ-aminobutyric acid). It has been found that germinated grains in general have nutritional advantages. The rice is used in Japanese and Korean cuisine.

Cooked germinated brown rice is softer and less chewy than plain brown rice—it is more acceptable to children in particular—and has additional nutritional advantages.

Germinated brown rice is produced by soaking for 4–20 hours in warm 30–40 °C (86–104 °F) water (or longer at lower temperature), changing water a few times if some smell develops, and rinsing before cooking. This stimulates germination, which activates various enzymes in the rice. By this method, it is possible to obtain a more complete amino acid profile, including GABA.

Although GBR is readily prepared at home, in Japan from 1995 it is sold ready-germinated at a higher price than ordinary rice. In 2004 about 15,000 tonnes were sold, to a value of about ¥15b.

== See also ==
- Germinated wheat
