= Sprouting =

Practice of germinating seeds to be eaten raw or cooked

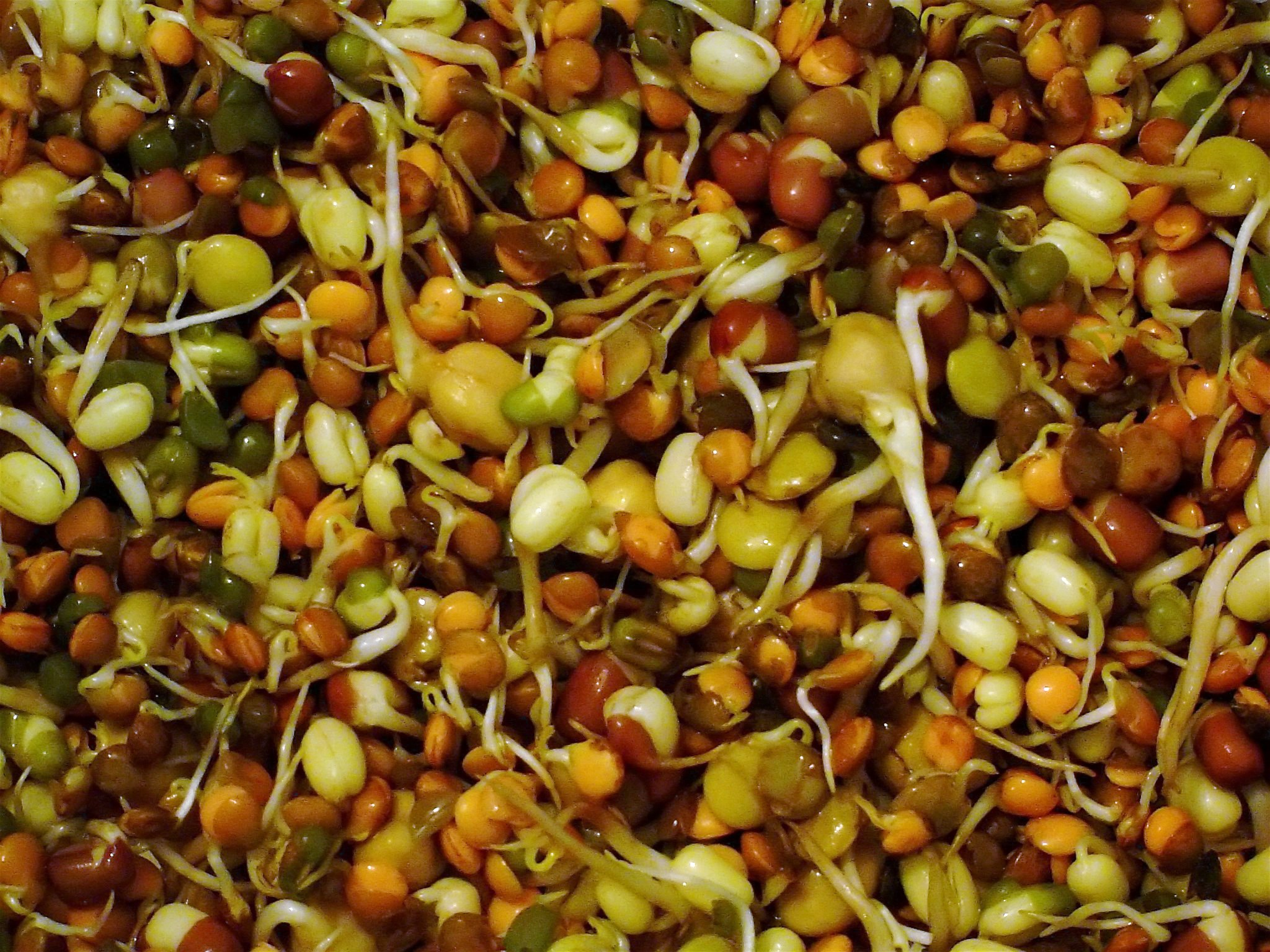
Mixed bean sprouts (shoots)

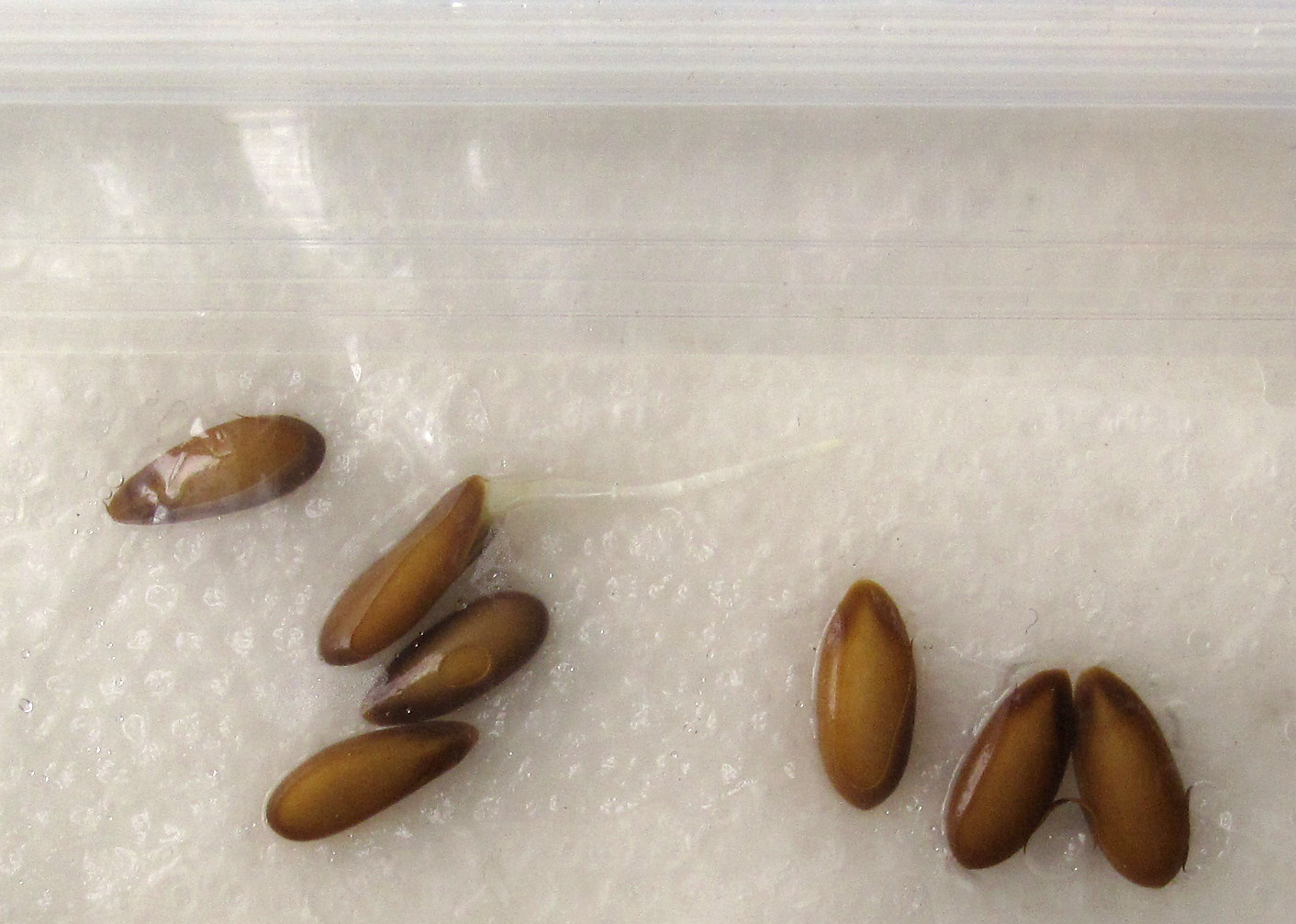
Melon seeds sprouting

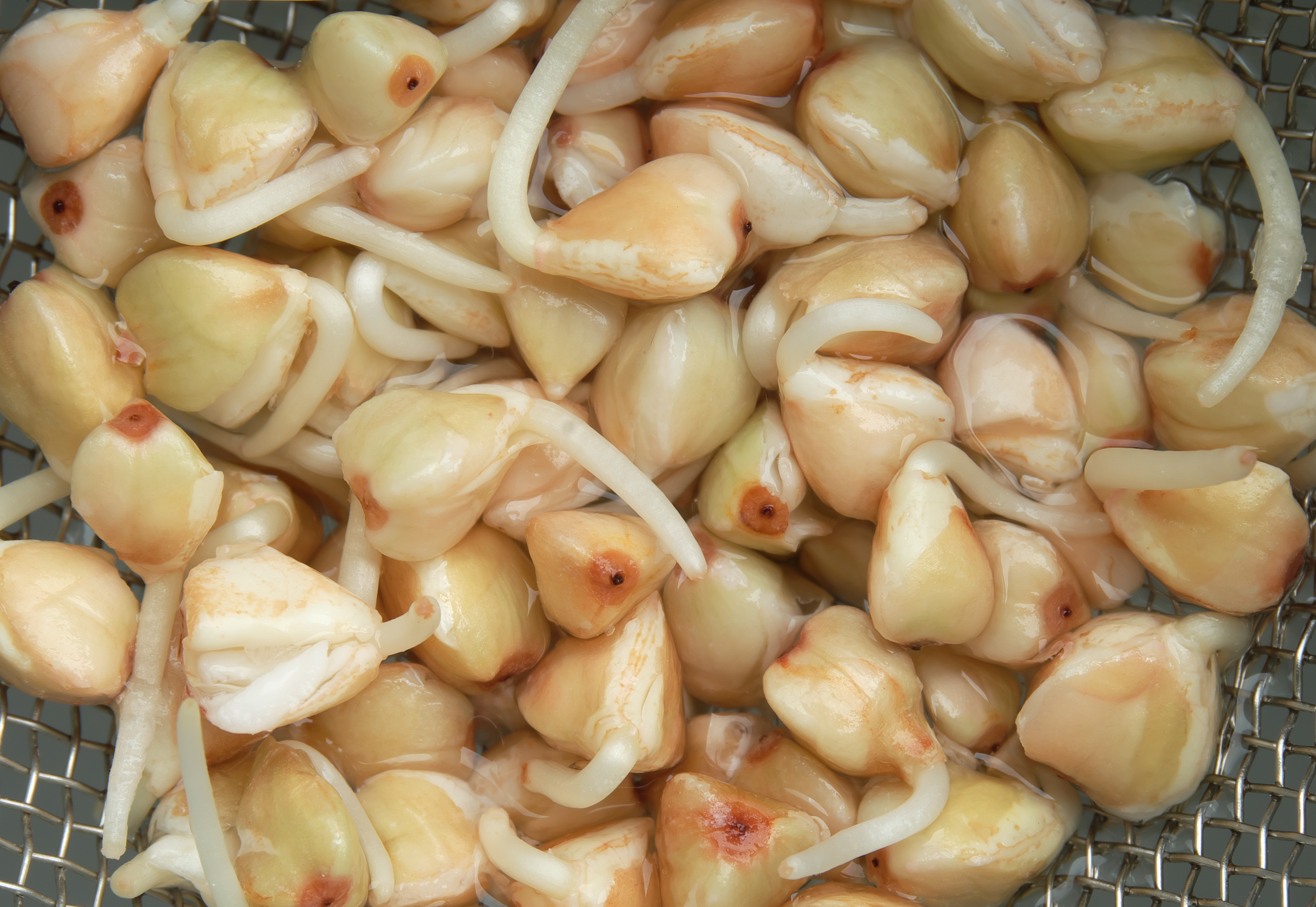
Buckwheat sprouts

Sprouting is the natural process by which seeds or spores germinate and put out shoots, and already established plants produce new leaves or buds, or other structures experience further growth.

In the field of nutrition, the term signifies the practice of germinating seeds (for example, mung beans or sunflower seeds) to be eaten raw or cooked, which is considered more nutritious.

== Suitable seeds ==
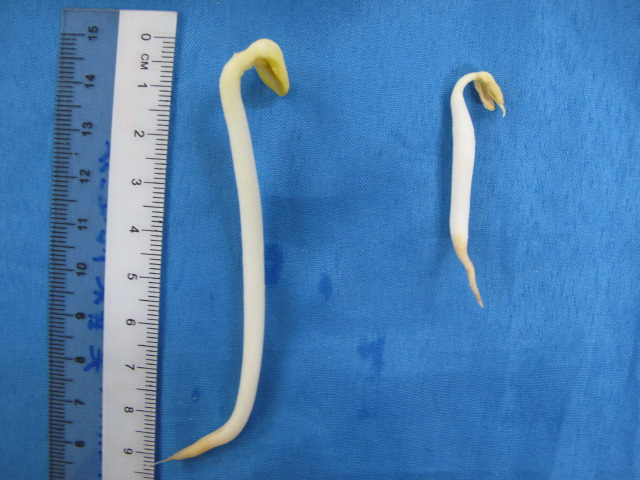
Soybean sprout next to a smaller mung bean sprout

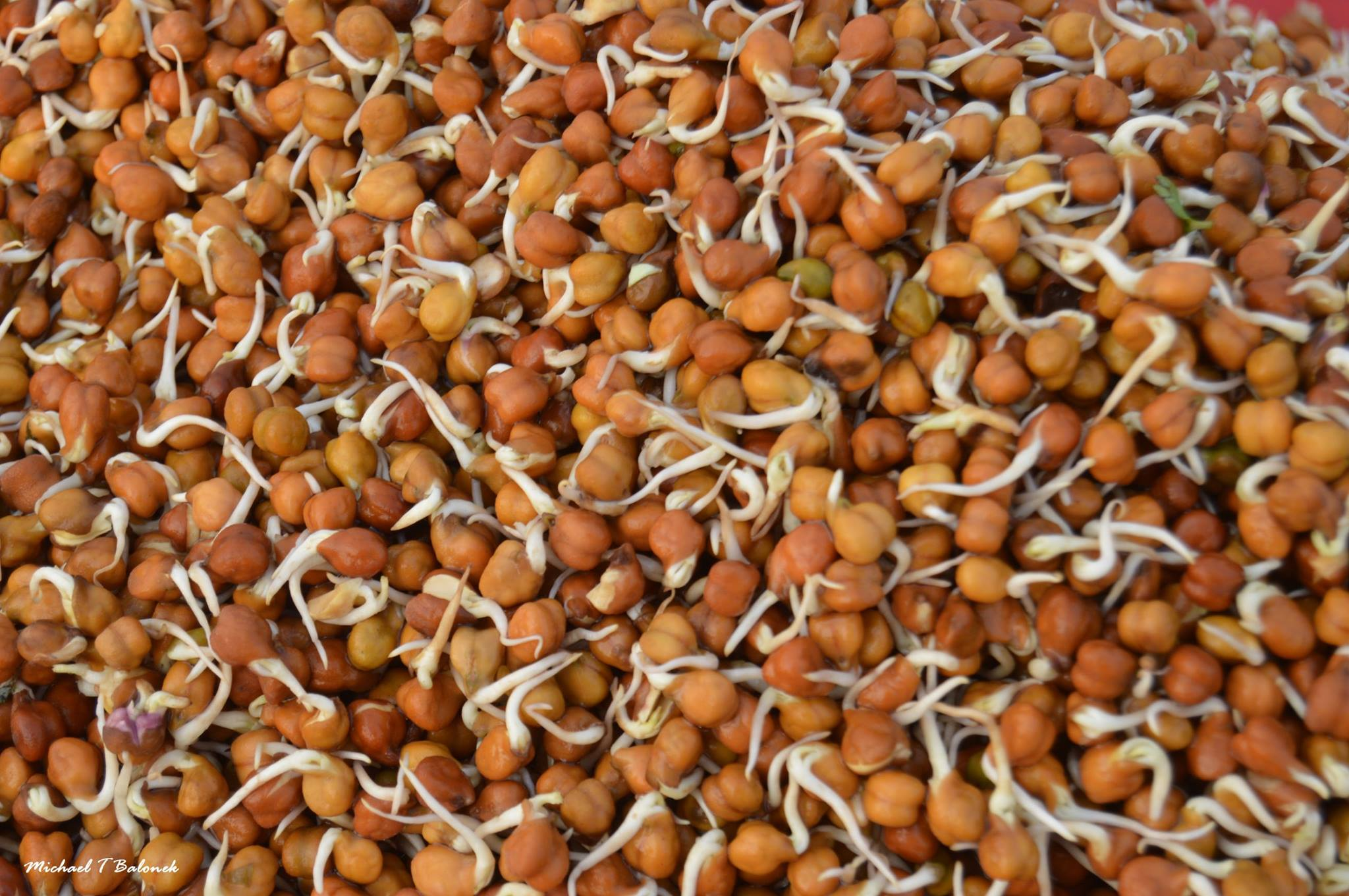
Sprouts sold as snacks during Kumbh Mela festival

All viable seeds can be sprouted, but some sprouts, such as kidney beans, should not be eaten raw.

Bean sprouts are a common ingredient across the world. They are particularly common in Eastern Asian cuisine. It typically takes one week for them to become fully grown. The sprouted beans are more nutritious than the original beans, and they require much less cooking time. There are two common types of bean sprouts:

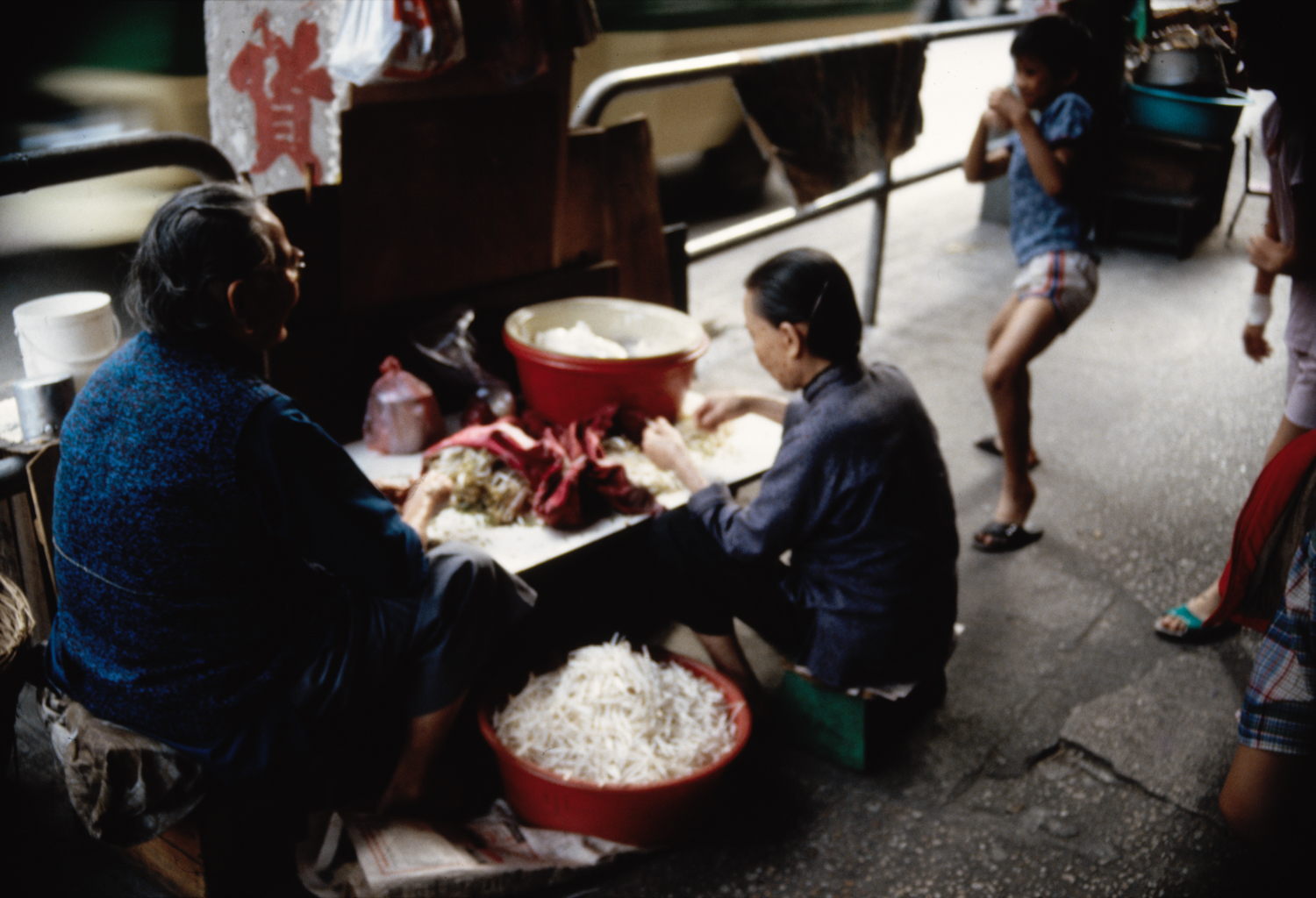
- Women trimming bean sprouts in the street. Photographic slide by Joy Larkhom, 1985
  Mung bean sprouts, made from greenish-capped mung beans
- Soybean sprouts, made from yellow, large-grained soybeans

Common sprouts used as food include:

- Pulses/legumes (pea family) - bean sprouts:
  alfalfa, clover, fenugreek, lentil, pea, chickpea (garbanzo), mung bean, and soy bean
- Cereals (grasses):
  oat, wheat, maize (corn), rice, barley, and rye
- Pseudocereals:
  quinoa, amaranth, and buckwheat
- Oilseeds:
  sesame, sunflower, almond, hazelnut, hemp, linseed, and peanut
- Brassica (cabbage family):
  broccoli, cabbage, watercress, mustard, mizuna, radish, and daikon (kaiware-daikon in Japanese cuisine), arugula, tatsoi, and turnip
- Umbelliferous vegetables (parsley family) - these may be used more as microgreens than sprouts:
  carrot, celery, fennel, and parsley.
- Allium (onion family) - cannot distinguish sprouts from microgreens:
  onion, leek, and green onion (me-negi in Japanese cuisine)
- Other vegetables and herbs:
  spinach, lettuce, milk thistle, and lemon grass

Although whole oats can be sprouted, oat groats sold in food stores, which are dehulled and have been steamed or roasted to prevent rancidity, will not sprout. Whole oats may have an indigestible hull which makes them difficult or even unfit for human consumption. In the case of rice, the husk of the paddy is removed before sprouting. Brown rice is widely used for germination in Japan and other countries, becoming germinated brown rice. Quinoa in its natural state is very easy to sprout, but when polished, or pre-cleaned of its saponin coating (becoming whiter), it loses its power to germinate.

Sprouts of the family Solanaceae (tomato, potato, paprika, and aubergine/eggplant) and the family Polygonaceae (rhubarb) cannot be eaten raw, as they can be poisonous. Some sprouts can be cooked to remove the relevant toxin, while others cannot.

With all seeds, care should be taken that they are intended for sprouting or human consumption, rather than sowing. Seeds intended for sowing may be treated with toxic chemical dressings. Several countries, such as New Zealand, require that some varieties of imported edible seed be heat-treated, thus making it impossible for them to sprout.

=== The germination process ===
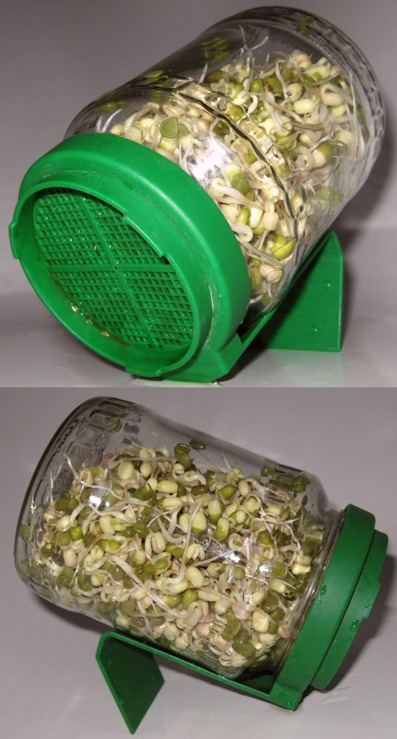
Sprouting mung beans in a glass sprouter jar with a green plastic sieve-lid

The germination process takes a few days and can be done at home manually, as a semi-automated process, or industrially on a large scale for commercial use. The time it takes for germination depends on the type of seed and their environment.

Typically the seeds are first rinsed to remove soil, dirt and the mucilaginous substances produced by some seeds when they come in contact with water. Then they are soaked for from 20 minutes to 12 hours, depending on the type and size of the seed. The soaking increases the water content in the seeds and brings them out of quiescence. After draining and then rinsing seeds at regular intervals, the seeds then germinate, or sprout.

For home sprouting, the seeds are soaked (big seeds) or moistened (small), then left at room temperature (13 to 21 °C or 55 to 70 °F) in a sprouting vessel. Many different types of vessels can be used as a sprouting vessel. One type is a simple glass jar with a piece of cloth or nylon window screen secured over its rim. Tiered clear-plastic sprouters are commercially available, allowing a number of crops to be grown simultaneously. By staggering sowings, a constant supply of young sprouts can be ensured. Any vessel used for sprouting must allow water to drain from it, because sprouts that sit in water will rot quickly. The seeds swell, may stick to the sides of the jar, and begin germinating within a day or two.

Another sprouting technique is to use a pulse drip method. The photo below on the right shows crimson clover sprouts grown on 3 mm (1/8 in) urethane foam mats. It is a one-way watering system with micro-sprinklers providing intermittent pulses of fresh water to reduce the risk of bacterial cross-contamination with Salmonella and E. coli during the sprouting process.

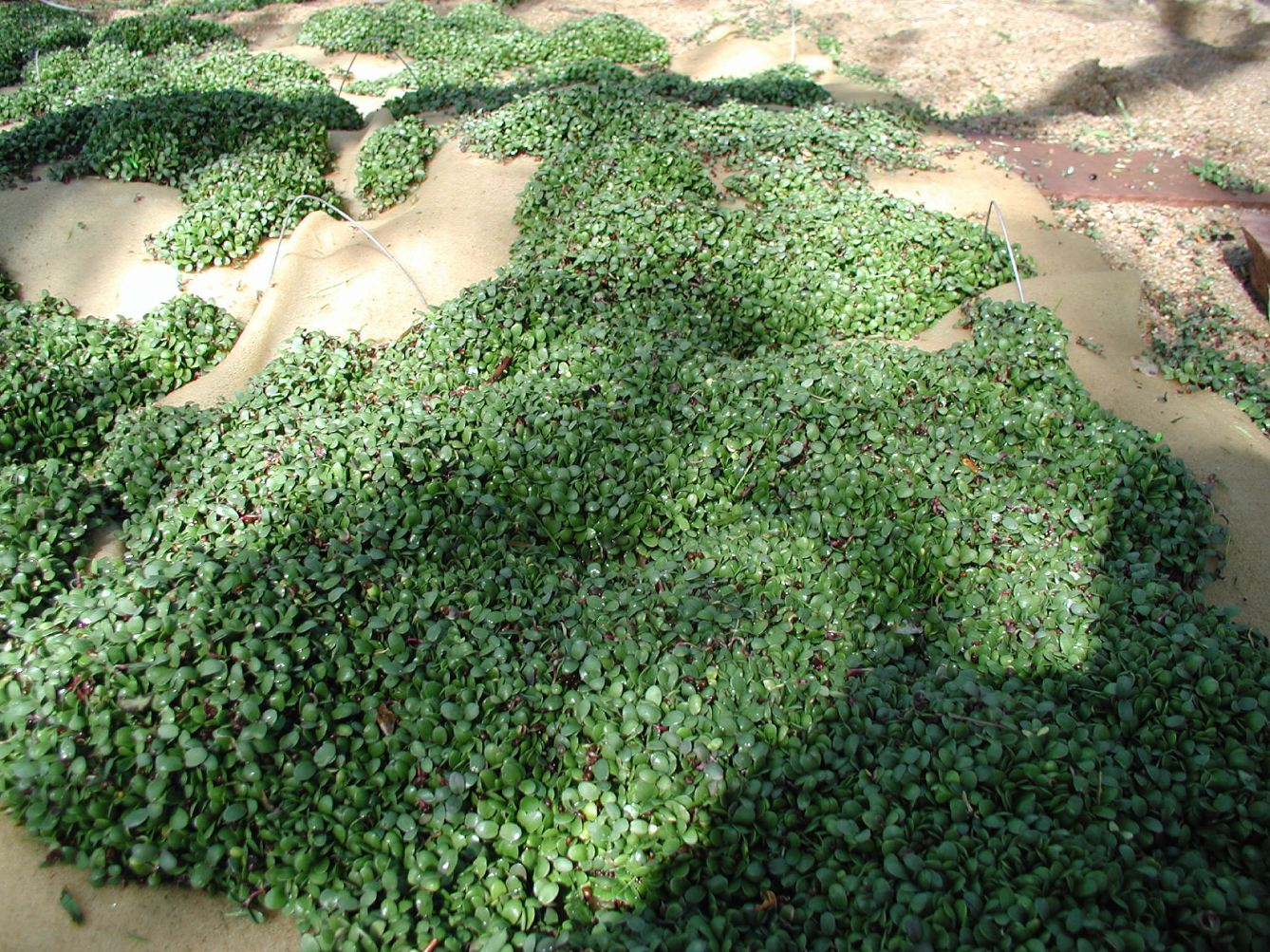
Crimson clover sprouts grown on 3 mm (1/8 in) urethane foam mats with a pulse drip technique. Four micro-sprinklers cycle pulsing continuously over a 7-day period, each putting out about 2 L (1/2 US gal) per hour. The four micro-sprinklers were each fitted with an LPD to keep the lines fully charged between pulses.

Sprouts are rinsed two to four times a day, depending on the climate and the type of seed, to provide them with moisture and prevent them from souring. Each seed has its own ideal sprouting time. After three to five days the sprouts will have grown 5 to 8 centimetres (2 to 3 in) in length and will be suitable for consumption. If left longer they will begin to develop leaves, and are then known as baby greens. A popular baby green is a sunflower after 7–10 days. Refrigeration can be used as needed to slow or halt the growth process of any sprout.

Common causes for sprouts becoming inedible:

- Seeds are not rinsed well enough before soaking
- Seeds are left in standing water after the initial soaking
- Seeds are allowed to dry out
- Temperature is too high or too low
- Dirty equipment
- Insufficient air flow
- Contaminated water source
- Poor germination rate

Mung beans can be sprouted either in light or dark conditions. Those sprouted in the dark will be crisper in texture and whiter, as in the case of commercially available Chinese Bean Sprouts, but these have less nutritional content than those grown in partial sunlight. Growing in full sunlight is not recommended, because it can cause the beans to overheat or dry out. Subjecting the sprouts to pressure, for example, by placing a weight on top of them in their sprouting container, will result in larger, crunchier sprouts similar to those sold in grocery stores.

A very effective way to sprout beans like lentils or azuki is in colanders. Soak the beans in water for about 8 hours then place in the colander. Wash twice a day. The sprouted beans can be eaten raw or cooked.

Sprouting is also applied on a large scale to barley as a part of the malting process. Malted barley is an important ingredient in beer and is used in large quantities. Most malted barley is widely distributed among retail sellers in North America.

Many varieties of nuts, such as almonds and peanuts, can also be started in their growth cycle by soaking and sprouting, although because the sprouts are generally still very small when eaten, they are usually called "soaks".

== Nutrition ==
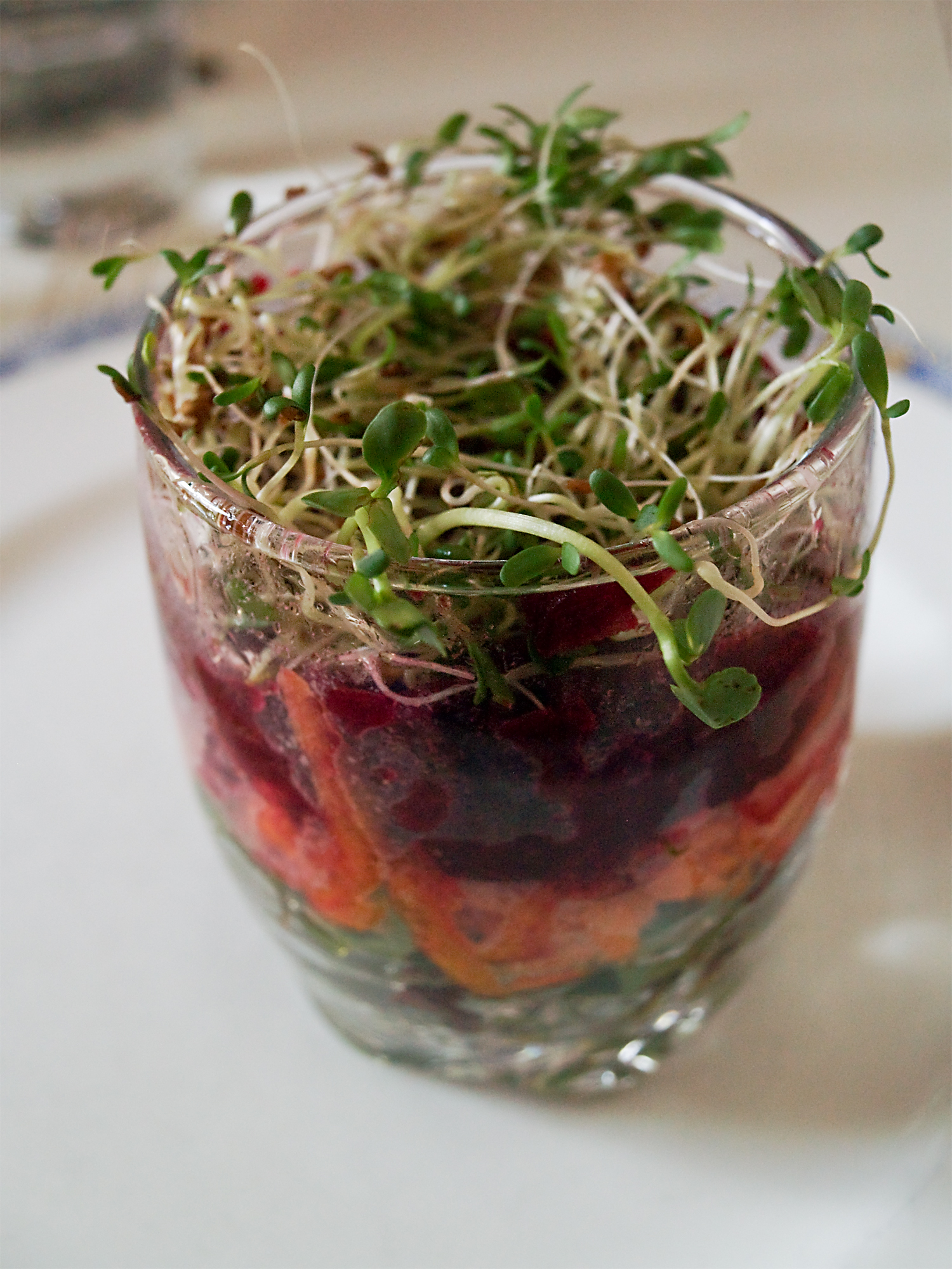
Sprouts served in a verrine

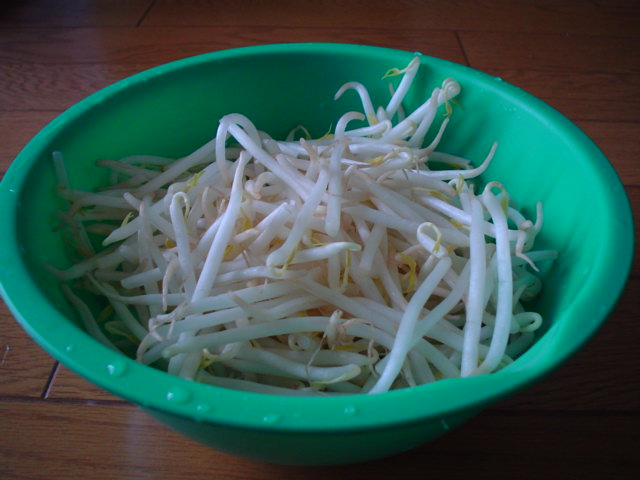
Mung bean sprouts in a bowl, grown without light to maintain their pale colour and reduce bitterness.

Sprouts can be germinated at home or produced industrially. They are a prominent ingredient of a raw food diet and are common in Eastern Asian cuisine and South east Asian cuisine

Raw lentils contain lectins which can be reduced by sprouting or cooking. A downside to consuming raw sprouts is that the process of germinating seeds can also be conducive to harmful bacterial growth.

Sprouts are rich in digestible energy, vitamins, minerals, amino acids, proteins, and phytochemicals, as these are necessary for a germinating plant to grow.

- "The metabolic activity of resting seeds increases as soon as they are hydrated during soaking. Complex biochemical changes occur during hydration and subsequent sprouting. The reserve chemical constituents, such as protein, starch and lipids, are broken down by enzymes into simple compounds that are used to make new compounds."
- "Sprouting grains causes increased activities of hydrolytic enzymes, improvements in the contents of total proteins, fat, certain essential amino acids, total sugars, B-group vitamins, and a decrease in dry matter, starch and anti-nutrients. The increased contents of protein, fat, fibre and total ash are only apparent and attributable to the disappearance of starch. However, improvements in amino acid composition, B-group vitamins, sugars, protein and starch digestibilities, and decrease in phytates and protease inhibitors are the metabolic effects of the sprouting process."

=== Protein ===
"Very complex qualitative changes are reported to occur during soaking and sprouting of seeds. The conversion of storage proteins of cereal grains into albumins and globulins during sprouting may improve the quality of cereal proteins. Many studies have shown an increase in the content of the amino acid lysine with sprouting."

"An increase in proteolytic activity during sprouting is desirable for nutritional improvement of cereals because it leads to hydrolysis of prolamins and the liberated amino acids such as glutamic and proline are converted to limiting amino acids such as lysine."

=== Fiber ===
"In sprouted barley, crude fiber, a major constituent of cell walls, increases both in percentage and real terms, with the synthesis of structural carbohydrates, such as cellulose and hemicellulose."

=== Vitamins ===
Sprouting treatment of cereal grains may improve vitamin value, especially the B-group vitamins. Certain vitamins such as α-tocopherol (vitamin-E) and β-carotene (vitamin-A precursor) are produced during the growth process.

== Health concerns ==
=== Bacterial infection ===
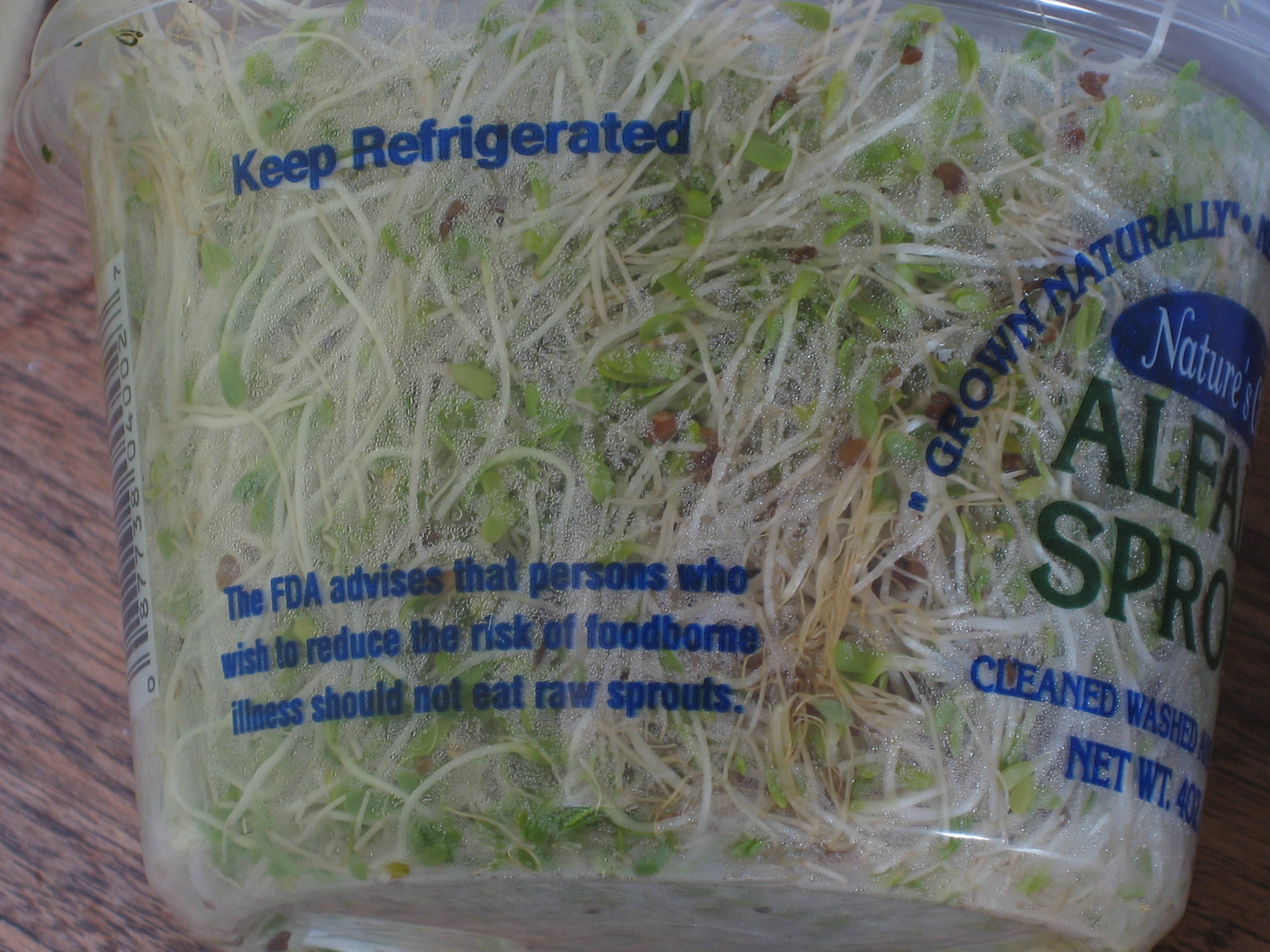
FDA health warning on a sprouts package

Commercially grown sprouts have been associated with multiple outbreaks of harmful bacteria, including salmonella and toxic forms of Escherichia coli. Such infections, which are so frequent in the United States that investigators call them "sproutbreaks", may be a result of contaminated seeds or of unhygienic production with high microbial counts. Sprout seeds can become contaminated in the fields where they are grown, and sanitizing steps may be unable to kill bacteria hidden in damaged seeds. A single surviving bacterium in a kilogram of seed can be enough to contaminate a whole batch of sprouts, according to the FDA.

To minimize the impact of the incidents and maintain public health, both the U.S. Food and Drug Administration (FDA) and Health Canada issued industry guidance on the safe manufacturing of edible sprouts and public education on their safe consumption. There are also publications for hobby farmers on safely growing and consuming sprouts at home. The recommendations include development and implementation of good agricultural practices and good manufacturing practices in the production and handling of seeds and sprouts, seed disinfection treatments, and microbial testing before the product enters the food supply.

In June 2011, contaminated fenugreek sprouts (grown from seed from Egypt) in Germany was identified as the source of the 2011 E. coli O104:H4 outbreak which German officials had at first wrongly blamed on cucumbers from Spain and then on mung bean sprouts. In addition to Germany, where 3,785 cases and 45 deaths had been reported by the end of the outbreak, a handful of cases were reported in several countries including Switzerland, Poland, the Netherlands, Sweden, Denmark, the UK, Canada, and the USA. Virtually all affected people had been in Germany shortly before becoming ill.

=== Anti-nutritional factors ===
Some legumes, including sprouts, can contain toxins or anti-nutritional factors, which can be reduced by soaking, sprouting and cooking. Joy Larkcom advises that to be on the safe side "one shouldn’t eat large quantities of raw legume sprouts on a regular basis, no more than about 550g (20oz) daily".

Phytic acid, an anti-nutritional factor, occurs primarily in the seed coats and germ tissue of plant seeds. It forms insoluble or nearly insoluble compounds with many metal ions, including those of calcium, iron, magnesium, and zinc, reducing their dietary availability. Diets high in phytic acid and poor in these minerals produce mineral deficiency in experimental animals (Gontzea and Sutzescu, 1968, as cited in Chavan and Kadam, 1989). The latter authors state that the sprouting of cereals has been reported to decrease levels of phytic acid. Similarly, Shipard (2005) states that enzymes of germination and sprouting can help decrease the detrimental substances such as phytic acid. However, the amount of phytic acid reduction from soaking is only marginal, and not enough to fully counteract its anti-nutrient effects.

=== Canavanine ===
Alfalfa seeds and sprouts contain L-canavanine, which can cause lupus-like disease in primates.

== European Union regulations ==
In order to prevent incidents like the 2011 EHEC epidemic, on 11 March 2013, the European Commission issued three new, tighter regulations.

- Regulation (EU) No 208/2013 requires that the origins of seeds must always be traceable at all stages of processing, production, and distribution. Therefore, a full description of the seeds or sprouts needs to be kept on record. (see also Article 18 of Regulation (EC) No 178/2002)
- Regulation (EU) No 209/2013 amends Regulation (EC) No 2073/2005 in respect of microbiological criteria for sprouts and the sampling rules for poultry carcasses and fresh poultry meat.
- Regulation (EU) No 211/2013 requires that imported sprouts and seeds intended for the production of sprouts have a certificate, drawn up in accordance with the model certificate in the Annex of the regulation, that serves as proof that the production process complies with the general hygiene provisions in Part A of Annex I to Regulation (EC) No 852/2004 and the traceability requirements of Implementing Regulation (EU) No 208/2013.

== Types of germination ==
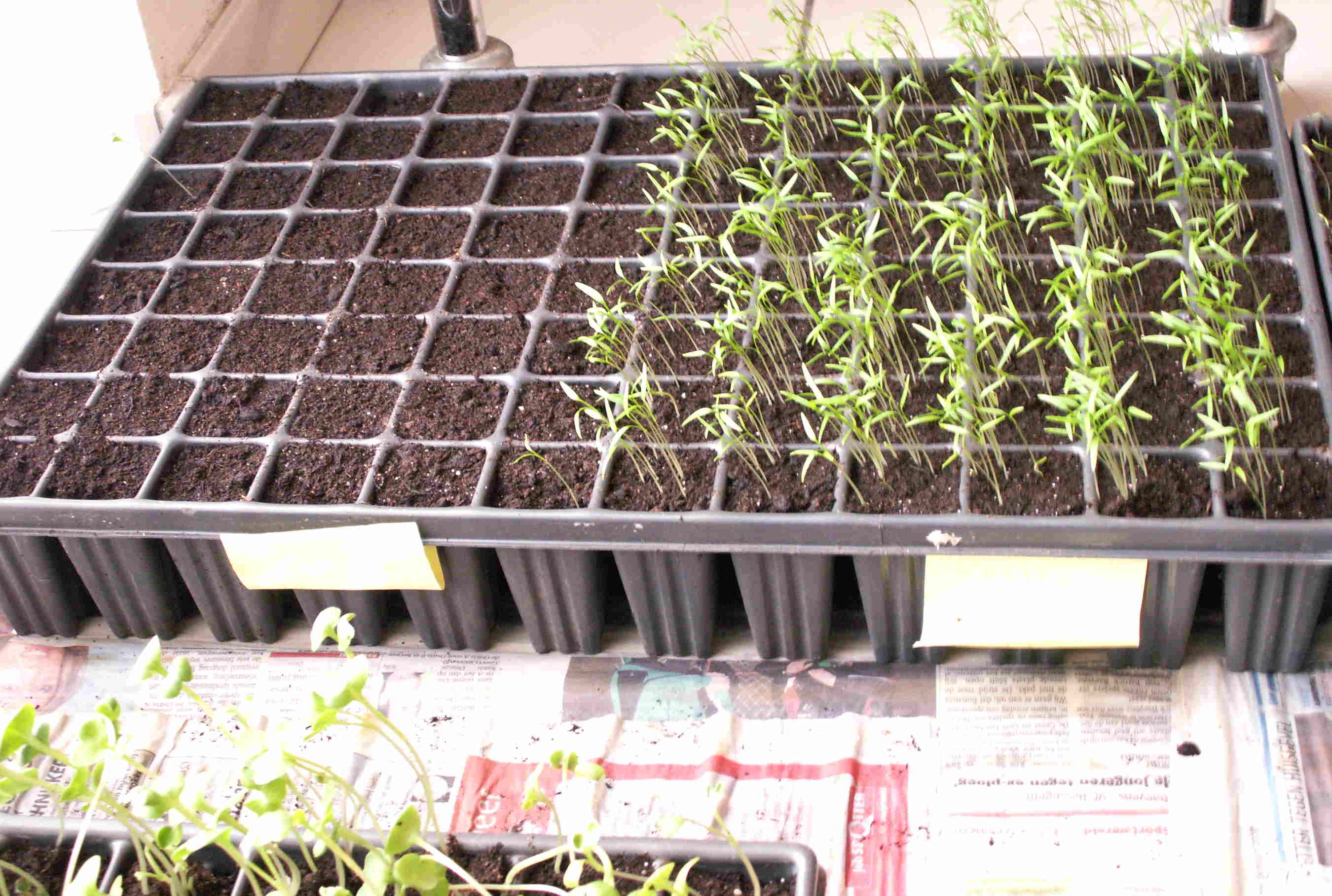
Seed tray

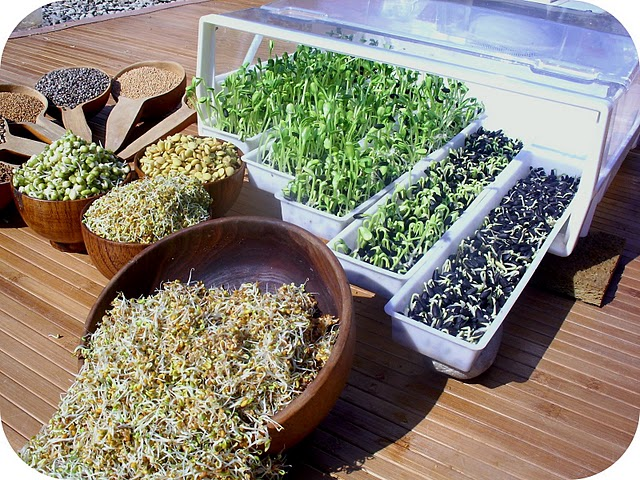
Automatic sprouter (greenhouse)

== See also ==
- Aeroponics
- Container garden
- Gillian McKeith
- Hydroponics
- Pulse drip irrigation
- Seedling
- Seed testing
- Seed tray
- Soybean sprout
- Sprouted bread
- Urban horticulture
- Wheatgrass
- Whole grains
- Germinated brown rice
