= List of military rations =

Overview of military rations by country

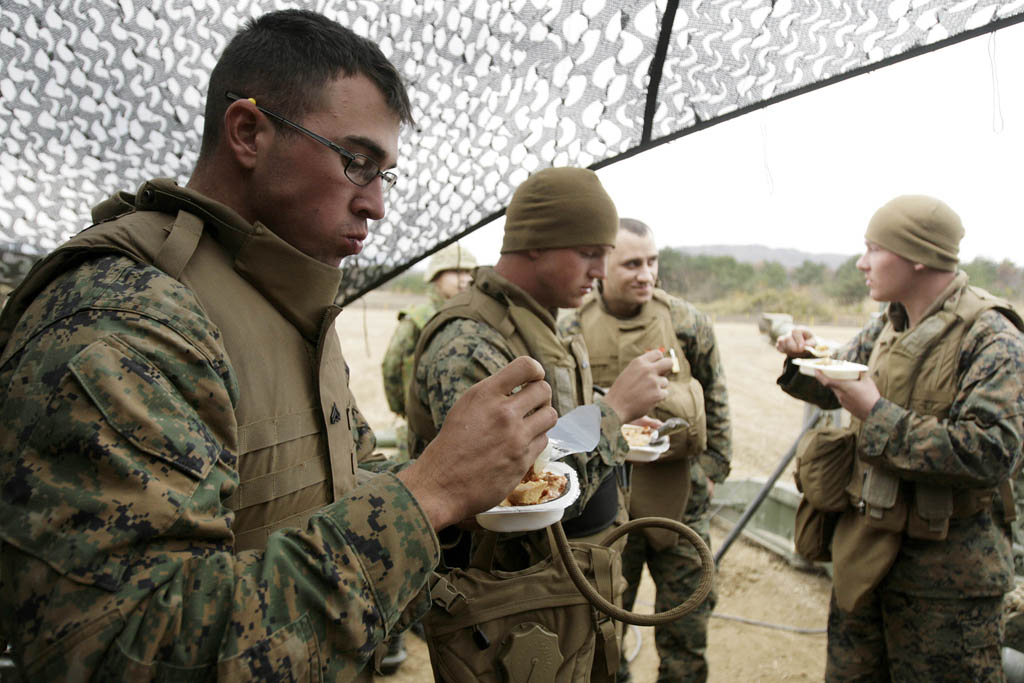
United States Marines eating Japan Ground Self-Defense Force rations in 2010

This is a list of military rations organized by country and region. A majority of the military rations listed here are present-issue field rations.

== Americas ==
=== Argentina ===
The Armed Forces of the Argentine Republic's combat ration (Spanish: Ración de Combate (Individual)) was introduced in 2003, consisting of a gray plastic-foil laminate pouch containing a mix of canned and dehydrated foods, plus minimal supplements, for one soldier for one day. All products in the RC are domestically produced, commercially available items.

Each ration contains canned meat, small can of meat spread, crackers, instant soup, cereal bar with fruit, a chocolate bar with nuts or caramels, instant coffee, orange juice powder, sugar, salt, a heating kit with disposable stove and alcohol-based fuel tablets, disposable butane lighter, resealable plastic bag, cooked rice, and a pack of paper tissues.

Menu #1 contains corned beef, meat pâté, crisp water crackers, and instant soup with fideo pasta.

Menu #2 contains roasted beef in gravy, meat pâté, whole wheat crackers, and quick-cooking polenta in cheese sauce.

=== Brazil ===
The R2 Combat Operation Ration (Portuguese: Ração Operacional de Combate – R2) is the current field & combat ration for the Brazilian Army. It is based on the earlier, but similar, Alternative Combat Ration for 24 Hours (Portuguese: Ração Alternativa de Combate, 24 horas) developed by the Brazilian Navy for use by Naval Infantry units. It contains the food and supplemental items needed by 1 soldier for 24 hours. It is to be used in situations where no other type of ration is available. All foods are packed inside 4-ply plastic and aluminum polylaminate retort pouches and are ready to eat without further preparation.

The ration is packed inside a heavy-duty (.25 mm thick) matte green or olive drab polyethylene bag measuring 300 mm wide by 400 mm long. It is printed with the logo of the Brazilian Army, the name of the ration, and menu information. Inside are 5 thinner (.10 mm) semi-transparent plastic bags, one for each meal and one for the accessories. Each bag is printed with meal information and contents.

Bag number	Portuguese	English	Dimension	Content
#1 (Note: Also called "Morning Coffee" (Portuguese: Café da Manhã).)	Desjejum	Breakfast	130 mm x 200 mm	40 g instant coffee w/milk & sugar; 25 g cereal bar; 2 slices of toast (15 g total); 15 g tub of jelly
#2	Almoço	Lunch	240 mm x 300 mm	250 g retort pouched main meal; 150 g pouch of precooked rice; 40 g pouch of cassava pudding; 10 g instant coffee; 2 x 6 g packets of refined sugar; 25 g bar of pressed raw brown sugar or banana or fruit-flavored sugar; 45 g of fruit juice powder
#3	Jantar	Dinner	240 mm x 300 mm	250 g retort pouched main meal; 100 g can or pouch of precooked sausages; 10 g instant coffee; 2 x 6 g packets refined sugar; 50 g jelly beans or hard candy; 45 g of fruit drink powder.
#4	Ceia	Supper	130 mm x 200 mm	40 g of chocolate milk powder; 25 g cereal bar; 2 slices of toast (15 g total); 15 g tub of jelly
#5	Acessórios	Accessories	160 mm x 260 mm	Disposable ration heater (round, with air holes inside); 120 g can of alcohol-based fuel (or plastic can with about 6 solid alcohol fuel tablets); 1 box or folder of moisture-resistant matches (20 total); A strip of 5 water purification tablets; 55 g envelope of electrolyte replacement beverage powder; 6 sheets of multipurpose paper.

*

The 250 g main meal pouches differ by menu, two provided for each menu (lunch & dinner) as follows:

Menu	Content
#1	1. Shredded beef in gravy 2. Spaghetti w/meat sauce
#2	1. Chicken w/vegetables 2. Rice w/black beans & beef
#3	1. Black bean stew 2. Ground beef w/potatoes
#4	1. Dried beef w/pumpkin 2. Chicken w/mixed vegetables & pasta
#5	1. White beans w/sausage 2. Risotto w/meat & vegetables

Brazil also fields the R3 Emergency Operation Ration (Portuguese: Ração Operacional de Emergência – R3), a 12-hour ration to be used in situations where cooked foods cannot be provided for all meals.

The R3 ration is similar to the R2 and uses the same components, but contains less food. The bag is printed with the emblem of the Brazilian Army, "Emergency Ration R3 (12 hours)" (Portuguese: Ração de Emergência R3 (12 Horas)) and Menu information. Inside are 3 thin plastic bags: 2 meal bags and 1 accessory packet.

=== Canada ===
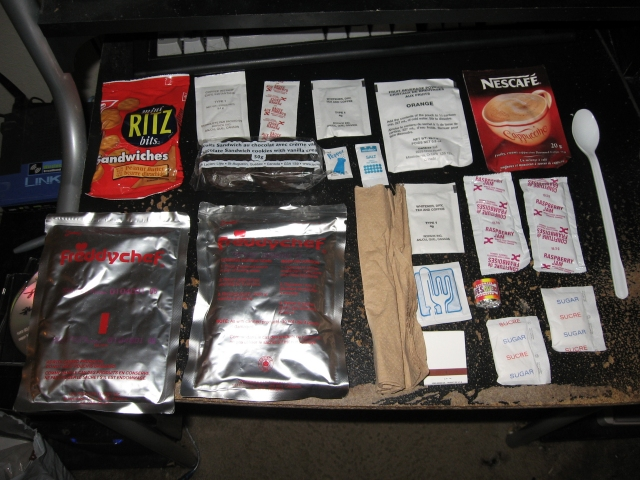
The contents of a cabbage roll IMP

The Canadian Armed Forces provides each soldier with a complete pre-cooked meal known as the Individual Meal Pack (IMP), packaged inside a heavy-duty folding paper bag. There are 5 breakfast menus, 6 lunch menus, and 6 supper menus. Canadian rations provide generous portions and contain a large number of commercially available items. The main meal is precooked and ready-to-eat, packed in heavy-duty plastic-foil retort pouches boxed with cardboard. Typically, the ration contains a meal item (beans and wiener sausages, scalloped potatoes with ham, smoked salmon fillet, macaroni and cheese, cheese omelette with mushrooms, shepherd's pie, etc.), wet-packed (sliced or mashed) fruit in a boxed retort pouch, and depending on the meal a combination of instant soup or cereal, fruit drink crystals, jam or cheese spread, peanut butter, honey, crackers, bread (bun) compressed into a retort pouch, coffee and tea, sugar, commercially available chocolate bars and hard candy, a long plastic spoon, paper towels and wet wipes. Canada also makes limited use of a Light Meal Pack containing dried meat or cheese, dried fruit, a granola bar, a breakfast cereal square, a chocolate bar, hard candy, hot cocoa mix, tea, and two pouches of instant fruit drink. Canadian ration packs also contain a book of cardboard matches.

=== Colombia ===
The Military Forces of Colombia issues the Campaign Ration (Spanish: Ración de Campaña), a dark olive green plastic bag weighing between 1092 and 1205 grams and providing 3,097 to 3,515 kcal (12,960 to 14,710 kJ). Inside are the retort pouch main courses and supplements needed by a soldier for one day. The individual meals, which cater to South American tastes, consist of a breakfast, a lunch, and a main meal (Tamal, envueltos, lentils with chorizo, arvejas con carne, garbanzo beans a la madrileña, arroz atollado, ajiaco con pollo, and sudado con papas y carne). The ration also includes bread products, beverage mixes, candy and accessories. All items except the beverage mixes require no further preparation and can be eaten either hot or cold. The beverage powders must be mixed with hot or cold water before consumption. Each ration also contains raw sugar, a can of condensed milk, sandwich cookies, sweetened and thickened cream spread, hard candy or caramels, peanuts or trail mix or 25 g of roasted almonds, instant coffee, salt, paper towels, a plastic spoon, 2 water purification tablets, and a multivitamin tablet.

=== Mexico ===
The Secretariat of National Defense issues the "Individual Soldiers Daily Combat Meal" box (Spanish: Ración Diaria Individual de Combate). It is packaged in an olive green and black plastic box with the contents printed on the front; the box contains three individual meal packs containing meals providing 3,640 to 4,030 kcal (15,200 to 16,900 kJ) which are meant to sustain a soldier for one day. Each individual meal package contains two main retort pouches which are meant to be eaten with each other. The first retort pouch usually contains a meat product (such as beef, pork, sausage, fish, ham, seafood, chicken, tuna, bacon, or other meats which are usually mixed with a flavoring sauce and vegetables) the second retort pouch contains a staple food (rice, hominy, noodles, beans, pasta, eggs, or more vegetables). Each meal package also contains salt, spices, condensed milk, cream, butter, chorizo spread, dried fruit or preserves, bread, crackers, sugar, custard, cookies, canned fish, cocoa mix, nuts, chocolate or other candies, vitamins, a large pouch of drinking water, a pouch of Jumex fruit juice or Coca-Cola, biodegradable napkins and utensils, and water purification tablets. Some meal packages do not contain the two main retort pouches and instead contain a single larger pouch with a finished meal such as tamales or steak and eggs but, these are usually only available when close to a base or when the military is operating in an urban area.

=== United States ===
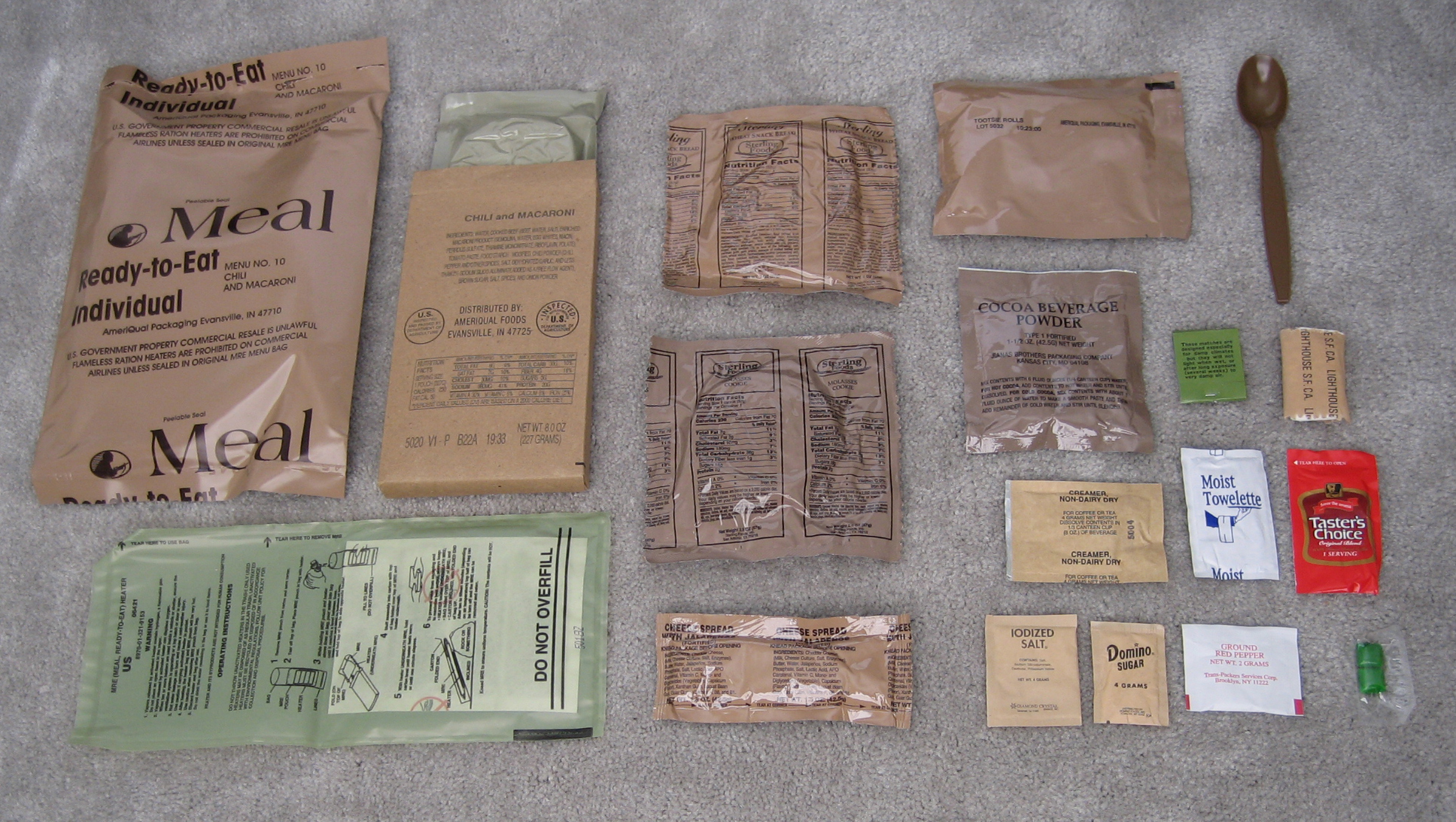
The contents of a chili and macaroni MRE

The United States Armed Forces' Meal, Ready-to-Eat (MRE) is packaged similarly to the Canadian ration. Each sealed plastic bag contains one entire precooked meal, with a number of supplements and accessories. The original 12 menus have been expanded to 24 and now contain a variety of ethnic and special request items as well. Kosher/Halal and Vegetarian menus are also provided. Each meal bag contains an 8-ounce (230 g) main course (packaged in a four-layer plastic and foil laminate retort pouch), 8 hardtack crackers, some form of spread (cheese, peanut butter, or jelly), a fruit-based beverage powder, some form of dessert (cake, candy, cookies, or fruit), and an accessory packet containing coffee or tea, creamer, sugar, salt, matches, a plastic spoon, and toilet paper. A chemical heater is packed with every meal.

The First Strike Ration (FSR) is a compact, eat-on-the-move ration to be used for no more than three days during initial periods of highly intense, highly mobile combat assaults. A single FSR (24 hours food) is about 50% of the size and weight of three MREs. Each FSR provides 2,900 kcal (12,000 kJ) (15% protein, 53% carbohydrates, 34% fat), versus the 3,800 kcal (16,000 kJ) in three MREs, and has a two-year shelf life when stored at 80 °F (27 °C). An FSR is packed in a single trilaminate bag and contains filled pocket sandwiches, a pouch of tuna or chicken, two packets of ERGO high-energy drink mix, two high-energy First Strike Bars, a Soldier Fuel bar, two packets of beef jerky (BBQ or Teriyaki flavored), fortified applesauce, nut and fruit mix, caffeinated gum, and an accessory pack containing a beverage mix, salt, matches, tissues, plastic spoon, and cleansing moist towelettes. The FSR comes in three menus:

Italian pocket sandwich	Honey BBQ beef pocket sandwich	Bacon-cheddar pocket sandwich
Chicken chunks pouch	Albacore tuna pouch	Pepperoni pocket sandwich
Tortillas & hot sauce	Tortillas & mayonnaise	Filled French toast pocket sandwich
Cinnamon & brown sugar toaster pastry	Lemon poppy-seed pound cake	Jalapeño cheese spread & wheat snack bread
Peanut butter and crackers	Cheese spread and crackers	Apple cider mix
Lemon tea mix	Instant coffee, non-dairy creamer and sugar	

Humanitarian daily rations are American rations supplied to civilians and other non-military personnel in humanitarian crises.

The Unitized Group Ration is an American group ration designed to feed groups of personnel. They are divided into four types and can be fully prepared and heated within less than one hour. While most of them are not intended to be eaten in the field, the Unitized Group Ration – Express type can be prepared and eaten in the field.

== Europe ==
=== Belgium ===
The Belgian Armed Forces issues the French Ration de Combat Individuelle Réchauffable (RCIR) to its troops on deployments and exercises.

=== Czech Republic ===
After joining NATO, the Army of the Czech Republic developed a combat ration known as the BDP (Czech: Bojová Dávka Potravin).

The BDP comes in two versions, type I and II, each holding two ready-to-eat main courses packed in large foil "cans" (beef roast with rice, pork goulash with potato, spicy risotto, pork with carrots and vegetables, etc.), a small plastic cup of lunch meat spread, cheese spread, hard bread, cookies, jam, instant coffee, tea bags, fruit-flavored multivitamin drink tablets, vitamin C enriched fruit drink powder, a chocolate bar, sugar, salt, chewing gum, wet napkins, paper towels, a plastic bag, and a menu and instruction sheet.

A modified version of the BDP known as the KDP (Czech: Konzervovaná Dávka Potravin) is also used. This contains the same items as the BDP, but adds an aluminium cup, plastic utensils, a folding stove with fuel tablets and matches, and soap.

=== Denmark ===
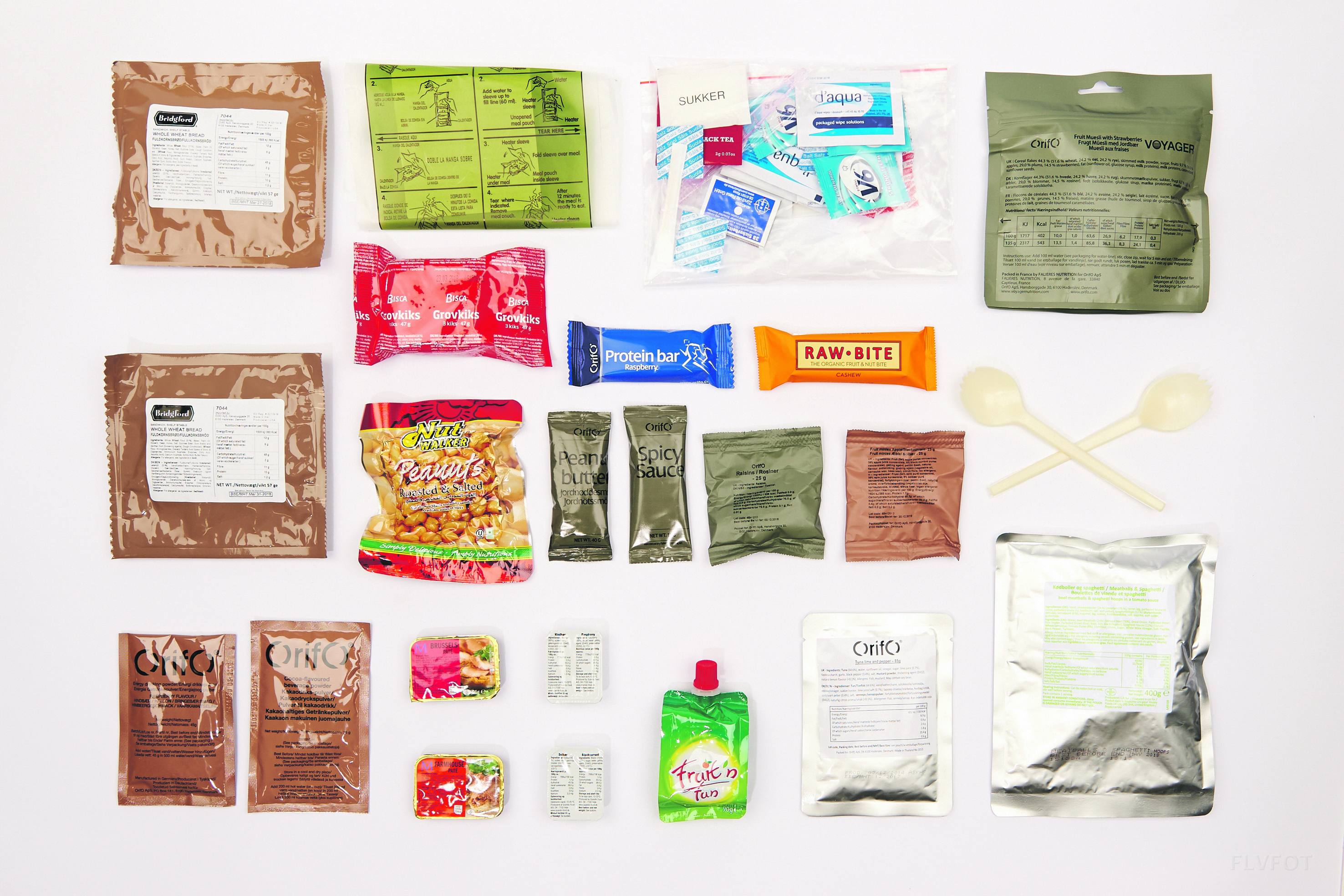
Danish ration

Danish Defence developed a modern field ration inspired by Norwegian and American rations. It consist of Drytech freeze-dried main meals and several additional items such as dried fruits and nuts, energy bars, hard biscuits, meat pâté, etc.

=== Finland ===
During peacetime, when Finnish Defence Forces conscripts are not provided with meals cooked either in garrisons or attached field kitchens, they are provided with rations (colloquially known as sissi rations) packed in a clear plastic bag. Several different menus exist, however all include foil-packed crispbread, coffee and tea, sugar, chocolate, small tins of beef or pork, chewing gum, dry porridge, energy drink powder, etc. Soups and porridges that are meant to be mixed with water and cooked are usually prepared in Trangia-type portable stoves that are shared by the pair in a fire and maneuver team, or in individual mess kits.

=== France ===
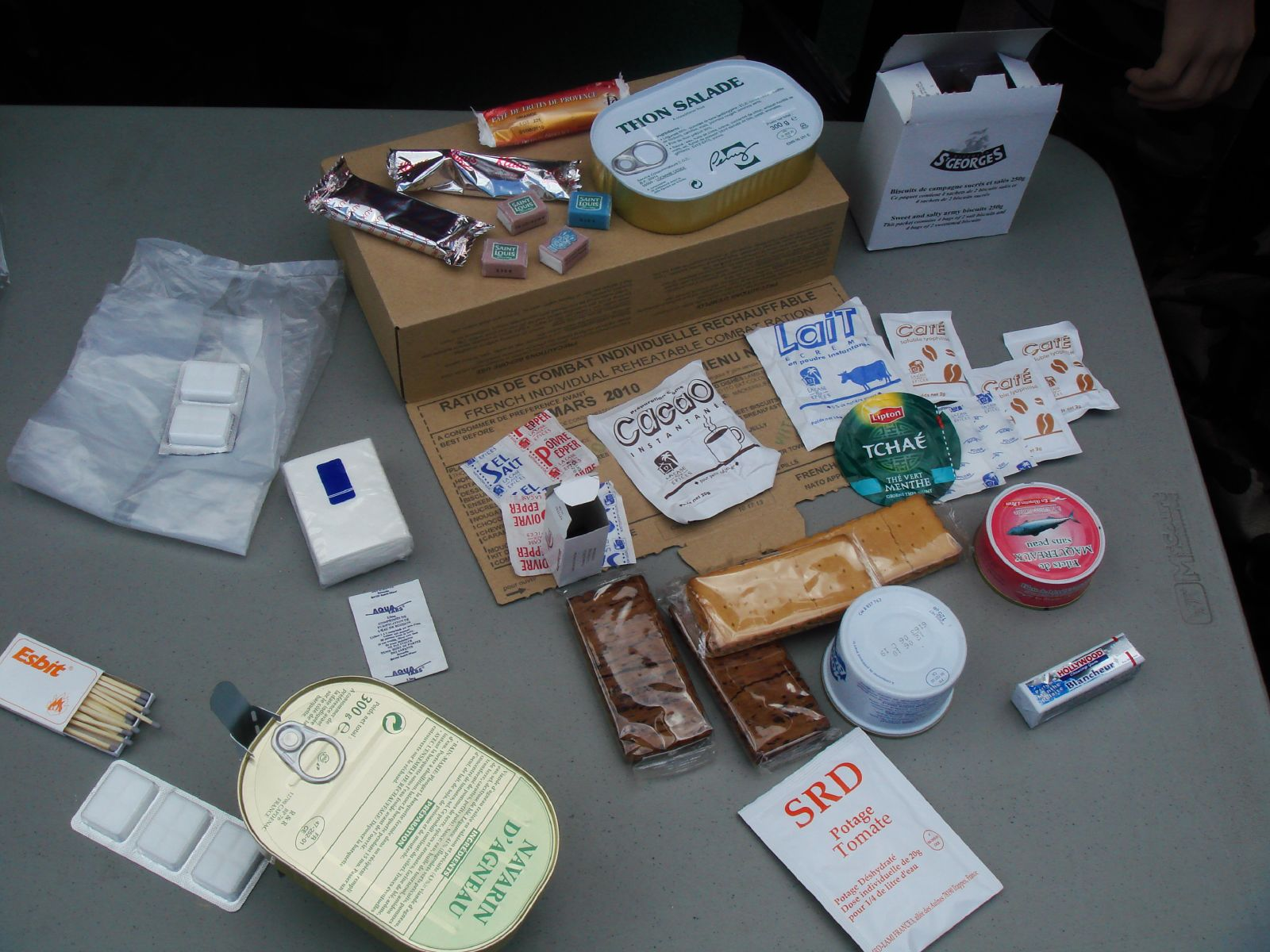
French combat ration

The French Armed Forces 24-hour combat ration, the RCIR (French: Ration de Combat Individuelle Réchauffable) comes in 14 menus packed in a small cardboard box. Inside are two pre-cooked, ready-to-eat meal main courses packed in thin metal cans somewhat like oversized sardine tins, and an hors d'oeuvre in a more conventional can or tin. Current main courses include items such as beef salad, tuna and potatoes, salmon with rice and vegetables, shepherd's pie, rabbit casserole, chili con carne, paella, veau marengo (veal), navarin d'agneau (lamb), poultry and spring vegetables, etc. Hors d'oeuvres include: salmon terrine, chicken liver, tuna in sauce, fish terrine, duck mousse, etc. Each meal box also contains a package of instant soup, hard crackers, cheese spread, chocolate, caramels or boiled sweets, instant café-au-lait, sugar, cocoa powder, matches, a disposable folding ration heater and fuel tablets, and water purifying tablets.

=== Germany ===
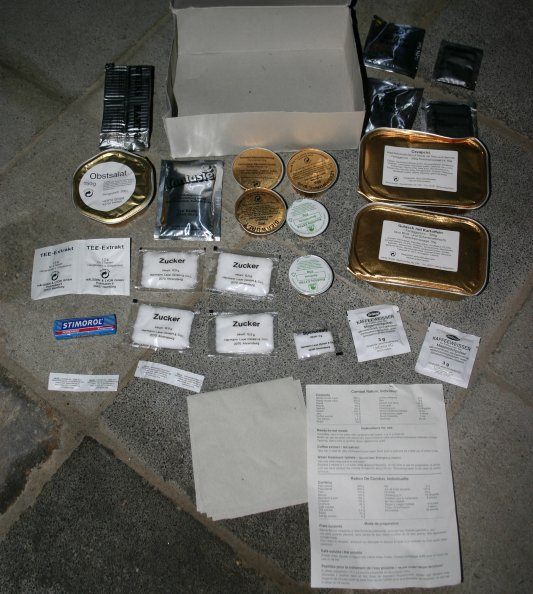
The contents of a German combat ration

The Bundeswehr uses the Einpersonenpackung to provide two substantial meals to each soldier. The standard practice is to provide one hot cooked meal for the other meal whenever possible. A heater or oven is not included since an Esbit cooker is part of each soldier's personal equipment. Enough food items are contained within the Einpersonenpackung to sustain the soldier for 24 hours. Currently there are three menus; each includes two meals out of a selection of 19 meals, with several heavy-duty foil trays containing items such as lentils with sausages, Yugoslav Sausage, Goulash, beef burgers in tomato sauce, Italian pasta, or Tofu stir-fry. There are also three smaller foil "cans" of bread spreads such as cheese spread, liver-sausage, dried-meat sausage, or cheese spread with green peppers. The meal box also includes: thinly sliced rye bread (170 g), hard crackers (1100 kcal), a foil can of fruit salad, instant cream of wheat, instant fruit juice powder, instant coffee, instant tea, powdered cream, a chocolate bar, sugar, salt, gum, jam, water purifying tablets, two plastic bags, matches, paper towels, and a user guide.

The Einpersonenpackung ration is supplied in two types, rations 1 to 5 are packaged in a grey cardboard box with the meals packaged in sealed heavy duty foil trays which may be heated by immersing in hot water. The trays are opened using a knife or other sharp implement. Rations 6 to 19 are packaged in a resealable carry pouch, which are either NATO Olive coloured, desert brown or transparent. The meals are packed in retort pouches.

==== Individual EPa Rations I-V ====
Rations I-V
Field Ration Type I	Field Ration Type II	Field Ration III	Field Ration IV	Field Ration V
Ravioli with mushroom sauce Indian rice dish with chicken sausage patties Semolina dessert with fruits Rye wholemeal bread Bierwurst Beef ham sausage Apricot jam Blackcurrant jam Chocolate Hard biscuits Peppermint gum 2 x Instant coffee 2 x Instant tea 2 x Coffee whitener 2 x Drink powder "Exotic" 2 x Powdered drink "Grapefruit"	Cevapcici with rice and vegetables Stew with potatoes (beef and pork) Fruit salad Rye wholemeal bread Beef ham sausage Sausage, coarse Bierwurst Apricot jam Blackcurrant jam Chocolate Hard biscuits Peppermint gum 2 x Instant coffee 2 x Instant tea 2 x Coffee whitener 2 x Drink powder "Exotic" 2 x Powdered drink "Grapefruit"	South American Vegetable Chilli Semolina Rye wholemeal bread Beef Lyon, coarse Beef ham sausage Sour cherry jam Blackcurrant jam Chocolate Hard biscuits Peppermint gum 2 x Instant coffee 2 x Instant tea 2 x Coffee whitener 2 x Drink powder "Exotic" 2 x Powdered drink "Grapefruit"	Lentil stew with sausage Spiral pasta in meat sauce Granola bars "caramel" Rye wholemeal bread Beef Lyon, coarse Apricot jam Blackcurrant jam Chocolate Hard biscuits Peppermint gum 2 x Instant coffee 2 x Instant tea 2 x Coffee whitener 2 x Drink powder "Exotic" 2 x Powdered drink "Grapefruit"	Tortellini stuffed with pork in tomato sauce Rice with turkey, calamari and prawns Fruit salad Rye wholemeal bread Beef ham sausage Beef Lyon Apricot jam Blackcurrant jam Chocolate Hard biscuits 2 x Instant coffee 2 x Instant tea 2 x Coffee whitener 2 x Drink powder "Exotic" 2 x Powdered drink "Fantasy"
Contents common to all rations
1 x match-book, 1 x refreshing towel, 1 x 3 pocket tissues, 1x Cappuccino "Café", 1 x cappuccino "Choco" 1 x Ceylon tea, 1 x Apple tea, 2 x sugar 6 g, 3 x salt 1 g 1 x pack of gum (12 pieces) 1 x multivitamin effervescent tablet, 1 x Cube Dextro Energy, 8 Water purifying tablets

Rations 6 to 19 are packaged in a resealable carry pouch, which is NATO Olive, desert brown or transparent. The meals are packed in retort pouches.

Rations V-XIV
Field Ration Type VI	Field Ration Type VII	Field Ration Type VIII
Ready meal Pork goulash stew with noodles 300 g Ready meal "Mexico Hacksteak": Salisbury steak with potatoes and vegetables 300 g Bread 170 g Wheat biscuits 100 g Spread-Bierwurst 50 g Spread-poultry Lyon 48 g Jam 2 x 25 g Swiss Muesli 80 g Yogurt dessert with berries 80 g Salted peanuts, roasted 30 g Energy Bars "Chocolate" 60 g Energy bars "Apple Cinnamon" 50 g Hypo Tonic drink powder 4 x 37.5 g	Ready meal rice with meat sauce 300 g Ready meal noodles with meatballs 300 g Biscuit 125 g Tuna in Mayonnaise 85 g Wholemeal Fruit Muesli 80 g Dessert cream "Lemon" 80 g Salted peanuts, roasted 30 g Energy bars "Cookies'n'Cream" 60 g Energy bars "Caramel" 50 g Chocolate 50 g Hypo Tonic drink powder 4 x 37.5 g	Ready meal pea stew with sausage 300 g Ready meal Currywurst 300 g Bread 170 g Wheat biscuits 100 g Spread-Bierwurst 50 g Spread poultry Jagdwurst 48 g Jam 2 x 25 g Oatmeal with raisins, Apples and milk 80 g Dessert cream "Cappuccino" 80 g Peanuts, salted, roasted 30 g Energy Bars "Chocolate" 60 g Energy bars "Cranberry" 50 g Hypo Tonic drink powder 4 x 37.5 g
Type IX	Type X	Type XI
Ready meal "Bifteki-plate": Greek beef patties with vegetables 300 g Ready meal "Casserole": Pasta with meatballs and sauce chasseur 300 g Biscuit 125 g Tuna "Pepper & Lime" 85 g Chocolate muesli 80 g Dessert cream "Orange" 80 g Salted peanuts, roasted 30 g Energy bars "Cookies'n'Cream" 60 g Energy bars "Apple Cinnamon" 50 g Chocolate 50 g Hypo Tonic drink powder 4 x 37.5 g	Ready meal elk gourmet pot 100 g Ready meal "Pasta Primavera" 100 g Wholemeal bread in a tin (8 slices) 250 g Extra jam "Sour Cherry" 20 g Extra Jam "Strawberry" 20 g Turkey Lyon 25 g Homemade sausage 25 g Vegetable Spreads "herbs" 25 g Whole grain cereal with milk 150 g Energy bars "Caramel" 50 g Energy bars "Apple Cinnamon" 50 g Cookies (12 pieces) 125 g Chocolate 50 g Sweets (Vivil, cream Life) Black tea 1.75 g Peppermint 2.25 g Espresso 2 g Cappuccino 11 g Energy drink "lemon" 25 g Energy Drink "Peach" 25 g Sugar 4 g Spice shaker Spoon 1 piece	Ready meal Chicken in Creamy Pasta 100 g Ready meal fried rice "Balkanart" 125 g Wholemeal bread in a tin (8 slices) 250 g Extra jam "Sour Cherry" 20 g Extra jam "Apricot" 20 g Ham sausage 25 g Poultry sausage 25 g Vegetable Spreads "Puszta" 25 g Fruit muesli with orange juice 150 g Energy bars "Caramel" 50 g Energy bars "Cranberry" 50 g Cookies (12 pieces) 125 g Chocolate 50 g Sweets (Vivil, cream Life) 5 piece Black tea 1.75 g Peppermint 2.25 g Espresso 2 g Cappuccino 11 g Energy drink "lemon" 25 g Energy Drink "Peach" 25 g Sugar 4 g Spice Shaker 1 piece Spoon 1 piece
Type XII	Type XIII (Vegetarian)	Type XIV (Vegetarian)
Ready meal Casserole with beef and noodles 100 g Ready meal potato stew with fried onions 100 g Wholemeal bread in a tin (8 slices) 250 g Extra jam "Sour Cherry" 20 g Extra jam "Strawberry" 20 g Turkey paste 25 g Kalbsleberwurst 25 g Vegetable Spreads "mushroom" 25 g Whole grain cereal with milk 150 g Energy bars "Cranberry" 50 g Energy bars "Apple Cinnamon" 50 g Cookies (12 pieces) 125 g Chocolate 50 g Sweets (Vivil, cream Life) 5 piece Black tea 1.75 g Peppermint 2.25 g Espresso 2 g Cappuccino 11 g Energy drink "lemon" 25 g Energy Drink "Peach" 25 g Sugar 4 g Spice Shaker 1 piece Spoon 1 piece	Ready meal mushrooms and soy sauce with noodles 100 g Ready meal noodles in soy Bolognese 100 g Wholemeal bread in a tin (8 slices) 250 g Extra jam "Sour Cherry" 20 g Extra jam "Apricot" 20 g Vegetable Spreads "herbs" 25 g Vegetable Spreads "Puszta" 25 g Vegetable Spreads "mushroom" 25 g Whole grain cereal with milk 150 g Energy bars "Caramel" 50 g Energy bars "Apple Cinnamon" 50 g Cookies (12 pieces) 125 g Chocolate 50 g Sweets (Vivil, cream Life) 5 piece Black tea 1.75 g Peppermint 2.25 g Espresso 2 g Cappuccino 11 g Energy drink "lemon" 25 g Energy Drink "Peach" 25 g Sugar 4 g Spice Shaker 1 piece Spoon 1 piece	Ready meal Garden Vegetable soy Risotto 125 g Ready meal Chilli soy stew with noodles 100 g Wholemeal bread in a tin (8 slices) 250 g Extra Jam "Sour Cherry" 20 g Extra Jam "Strawberry" 20 g Vegetable Spreads "herbs" 25 g Vegetable Spreads "Puszta" 25 g Vegetable Spreads "mushroom" 25 g Fruit muesli with orange juice 150 g Energy bars "Apple Cinnamon" 50 g Energy bars "Cranberry" 50 g Cookies (12 pieces) 125 g Chocolate 50 g Sweets (Vivil, cream Life) 5 piece Black tea 1.75 g Peppermint 2.25 g Espresso 2 g Cappuccino 11 g Energy drink "lemon" 25 g Energy Drink "Peach" 25 g Sugar 4 g Spice Shaker 1 piece Spoon 1 piece
Items common to rations VI to IX
1 x match-book, 1 x refreshing towel, 1 x 3 pocket tissues, 1x Cappuccino "Café", 1 x cappuccino "Choco" 1 x Ceylon tea, 1 x Apple tea, 2 x sugar 6 g, 3 x salt 1 g 1 x pack of gum (12 pieces) 1 x multivitamin effervescent tablet, 1 x Cube Dextro Energy, 8 Water purifying tablets

==== Day Rations XV-XIX ====
Like other German rations, is packed in a resealable carry pouch with the meals in retort pouches.

Individual Day Rations XV-XIX
Day Ration EPA XV	Day Ration EPA XVI	Day Ration EPA XVII	Day Ration EPA XVIII	Day Ration EPA XIX
Chocolate muesli with whole milk Potato Stew with Beef Pasta "Bella Italia" Rice pudding Nutri "strawberry" Cappuccino Lemon powder Xiss "Grapefruit" Wheat germ biscuits Chocolate 2 x K4 sesame bars	Oatmeal with raisins, apples and milk Chicken in Curry Vegetable risotto Mousse "stracciatella" Nutri "vanilla" Cappuccino Lemon juice powder Xiss "lemon" Banana chips 2 x K4 sesame bars	Fruit Muesli "Tropic" "Beef Stroganoff" Noodles in herb cream Orange cream Nutri "Hazel" Cappuccino Lemon juice powder Xiss "cherry" Wheat germ biscuits Chocolate 2 x K4 sesame bars	Nut cereal Fischtopf "Rügen" Couscous Hazelnut pudding Nutri "banana" Cappuccino Lemon juice powder Xiss "cherry" Wheat germ biscuits Apple Chips 2 x K4 sesame bars	Yogurt muesli Chervil Kartoffeltopf Pasta "Siciliana" Chocolate mousse Nutri "chocolate" Cappuccino Lemon juice powder Xiss "cherry" Wheat germ biscuits Chocolate 2 x K4 sesame bars
Items common to rations XV to XIX
Tea, salt, sugar, towelette

==== Earlier German rations ====
In the field, the Wehrmacht were provided rations from field kitchens based on the garrison ration. However additional classes of ration were available. The march ration was a cold food ration issued for not more than three or four consecutive days to units in transit either on carrier or by foot. It consisted of approximately 700 grams of bread, 200 grams of cold meat or cheese, 60 grams of bread spreads, 9 grams of coffee (or 4 grams of tea), 10 grams of sugar, and six cigarettes. The ration had a total weight of about 980 grams. An iron ration consisted of 250 grams of biscuits, 200 grams of cold meat, 150 of preserved vegetables, 25 of coffee, and 25 of salt. The total weight of the iron ration was 650 grams without packing and 825 grams with packing. An iron half-ration was composed of 250 grams of biscuits and 200 grams of preserved meat; thus its total weight was 450 grams without packing and 535 grams with packing.

=== Greece ===
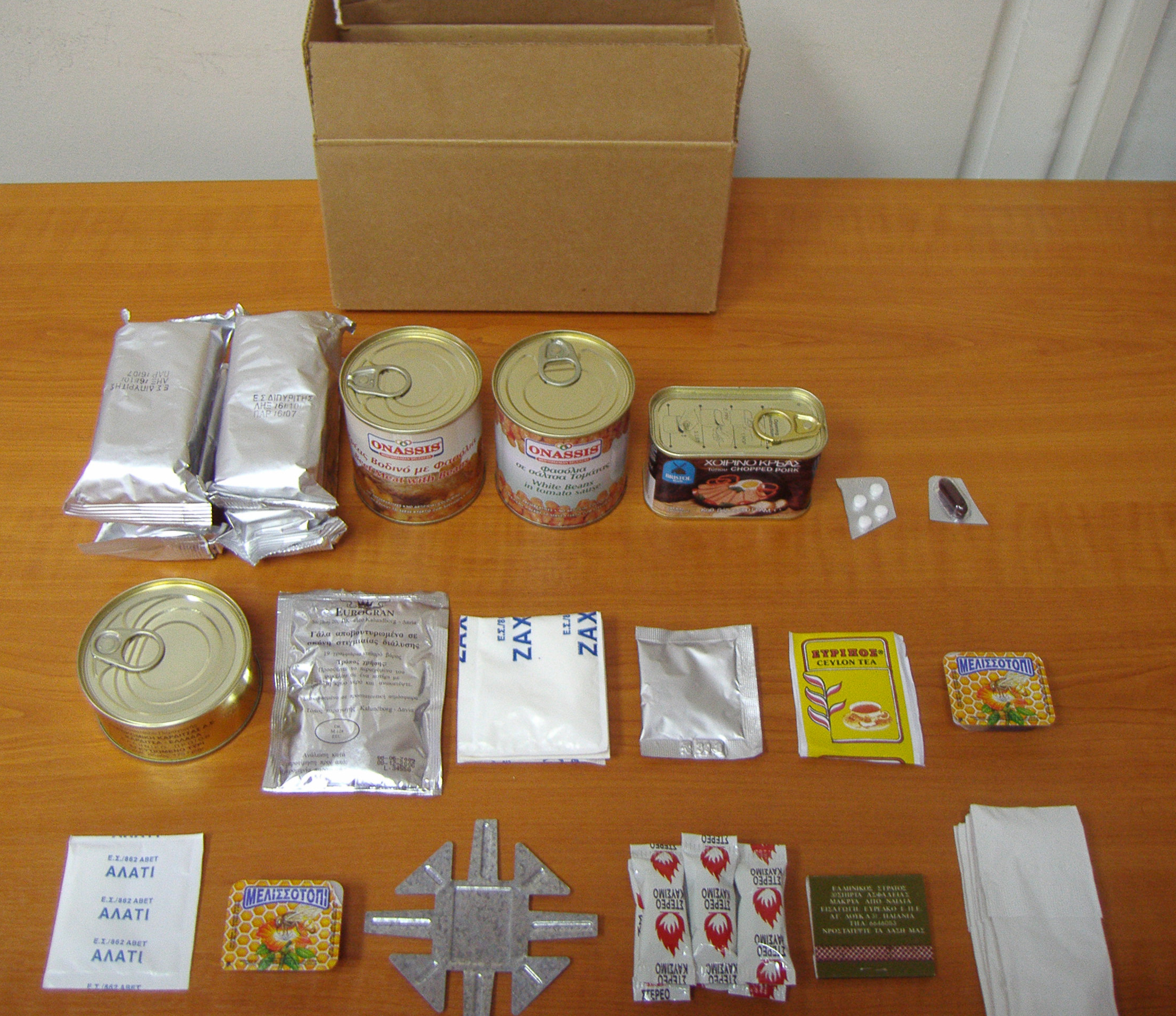
Greek combat ration

The primary operational ration used by the Hellenic Armed Forces is the Merida Eidikon Dynameon (Special Forces' Ration, also known as a 4B-ration), a 24-hour ration pack inside a cardboard box measuring 240 mm × 140 mm × 130 mm (9.4 in × 5.5 in × 5.1 in) and weighing 1 kg (2.2 lb). Most items are commercially procured, with the main meals in round pull-ring cans. Typical contents include: a 200 g canned meat ("SPAM"); 280 g can of meat with vegetables (beef and potatoes, etc.) (termed Prepared Food With Meat or ΠΦΜΚ); a 280 g can of cooked vegetables (green peas, etc.) (Prepared Food Without Meat or ΠΦΑΚ); an 85 g can of cheese; 6 hard biscuits; 40 g honey; three 50 g packages of raisins or chocolate; 30 g sugar; 1.5 g black tea, 2 g instant coffee; 19 g instant milk powder; two small packets of salt; a multivitamin tablet; 4 water purification tablets; a pack of tissues; a disposable ration heater with 5 fuel tablets; and a box of matches. In wartime, packs of locally commandeered cigarettes may also be issued.

=== Ireland ===
The Irish Defence Forces fields a 24-hour ration pack somewhat similar to that used by the British. It is packed in a large ziplock plastic bag and contains two pre-cooked main meals and items to be eaten throughout the day. Included are: instant soup, ramen noodles, an oatmeal block, a high-energy protein bar, both brown and fruit biscuits, sweets, and a selection of beverage mixes. Breakfast (bacon and beans or sausage and beans) is packaged in a retort pouch while dinner (Beef Casserole, Irish Stew, Chicken Curry, or a vegetarian main course) comes in either a flat tin or microwaveable plastic tray. Desserts consist of a retort-pouched dessert (chocolate pudding, syrup pudding, fruit dumplings), a Kendal mint cake, and a roll of fruit lozenges. Beverages include tea bags, instant coffee, hot cocoa, and a powdered isotonic drink mix. Also included are a pack of tissues, a small scouring pad, matches, water purification tablets, salt and pepper packets, sugar, dry cream powder, moist towelettes, and individual packets of foot powder.

=== Italy ===
The Italian Armed Forces use the "Razione Viveri Speciali da Combattimento", consisting of a heavy duty brownish-green plastic bag with three thin white cardboard cartons inside (one for breakfast, one for lunch and one for dinner), each containing meal items plus accessories. There are seven menus, called "modules", identified by colors: yellow, red, grey, green, white, pink and blue.

Typically, breakfast consists of: a chocolate bar, fruit candy, crackers or sweet bread, instant coffee, sugar, and a tube of sweetened condensed milk. Lunch has: two pull-ring cans with precooked foods (Tortellini al Ragù, Pasta e Fagioli, Wurstel, Tacchino in Gelatina, Insalata di Riso, etc.), a small can of fruit cocktail, a multivitamin tablet, energy and fiber tablets, instant coffee, sugar, and a plastic spoon wrapped with a napkin. Dinner consists of two more meal cans plus crackers, an energy bar, instant coffee, and sugar.

Accessories are: a folding stove, fuel tablets, water purification tablets, toothpick, matches, and three small disposable toothbrushes with pre-applied tooth powder.

=== Lithuania ===
Lithuanian Armed Forces field rations are based on the American MRE. They come in 10 menus packed in a dark green plastic bag, and besides the main meal in a retort pouch they also include two small dark chocolate bars, honey or jam, four hard-tack biscuits, a handful of almonds or hazelnuts, instant drink mix, tea or coffee, sugar, an antiseptic wipe, matches, solid fuel tablets, a flat disposable stove, a flameless heater (similar to the US one) and a cable-tie used to seal waste packaging back into the outer bag after use.

=== Netherlands ===
The Netherlands Armed Forces version of the 24-hour ration (Dutch: Gevechtsrantsoen, lit. 'combat ration') includes canned or retort pouched items, plus hard biscuits, jam, cheese spread, 3 cans of meat spread and 1 can of tuna spread, a chocolate bar, a roll of mints, instant coffee, tea, hot chocolate, lemon-flavour energy drink powder, instant soup, a vitamin pill, and supplementary items. The canned main course is packed in a thin aluminium can rather like a large sardine tin, containing 400 g of a precooked item such as rice with vegetables and beef, chicken with rice and curry, potatoes with sausage and green vegetables, or sauerkraut with sausage and green vegetables. The newer retort-pouches contain a 350 g serving of dishes such as brown beans with pork, chili con carne, corned beef hash, or chicken and pasta in tomato sauce. The ration pack provides breakfast and lunch only; the two canned or pouched main meals are issued separately.

=== Norway ===
The Norwegian Armed Forces use a 24-hour ration pack (Norwegian: feltrasjon) designed by Drytech, consisting of 2 freeze-dried main meals, a packet of compressed breakfast cereal, packets of instant soup, and supplements. These are packed in 3 green polylaminate bags labelled "Breakfast", "Lunch", or "Dinner", overwrapped in clear plastic and issued as one day's ration. Depending on the soldiers activity, the rations are delivered in two different sizes of either 3800 kcal or 5000 kcal. Included are a substantial assortment of beverages (cocoa mix, instant coffee, energy drink powder, and herbal teas), plus thin sliced rye bread and chocolate, chewing gum, a vitamin tablet, and litter bags. There are 7 completely different menus, and ongoing development to meet different nations requirements. The main meals are for example Chili con carne, different pasta dishes, Beef Stew, Beef and Potato Casserole, Lamb Mulligatawny, Cod and Potato Casserole, Pasta Bolognese, Wolf-fish with Prawns and Dill, Sweet and Sour Chicken, Rice in Basil Sauce etc. Small tins of fish are often provided separately.

=== Poland ===
The current Polish Armed Forces combat ration (Polish: Zestaw Żywnościowy Indywidualnej Racji Suchej) is packed in a green plastic-foil bag containing: 2 small cans of meat or meat spread or cheese, 2 packages of hard crackers, a tube of sweetened condensed milk, 2 packets of instant coffee, a packet of instant tea, 3 sugar packets, an individually wrapped Vitamin C fortified boiled sweets, a stick of chewing gum, safety matches, a menu and instruction sheet, a plastic bag, and 2 paper towels.

Field ration (24h) "RB1" / "RB2" / "RB3"

Meal A (breakfast): - goulash 400 g / beans with sausage and meat in tomato sauce 400 g / pork shoulder with rice and vegetables 400 g - pâté 100 g - jam 25 g - crispbread 50 g - instant tea 30 g - fruit bar - flameless heater - sachet water 45 ml

Meal B (lunch): - chicken with rice and vegetables 400 g / spaghetti with meat 400 g / bogracz (Hungarian dish densely packed with beef) 400 g - crackers 45 g - instant tea 30 g - condensed milk tube 100 g - dark chocolate 50 g - flameless heater - sachet water 45 ml

Meal C (dinner): - canned meat 100 g - crackers 45 g - honey 25 g - instant tea 30 g - fruit bar

Accessories: - sugar 10 g x3 - coffee candy x3 - vitamin C candy x3 - chewing gum x3 - salt, pepper x3 - dried fruits 50 g - instant tea - instant borsch - plastic bag - matches - toilet paper - wet wipe tissue x3 - cutlery

Energy value 3496,15kcal / 3693,82 kcal / 3459,6 kcal Weight 1.85 kg (4.1 lb)

=== Russia ===
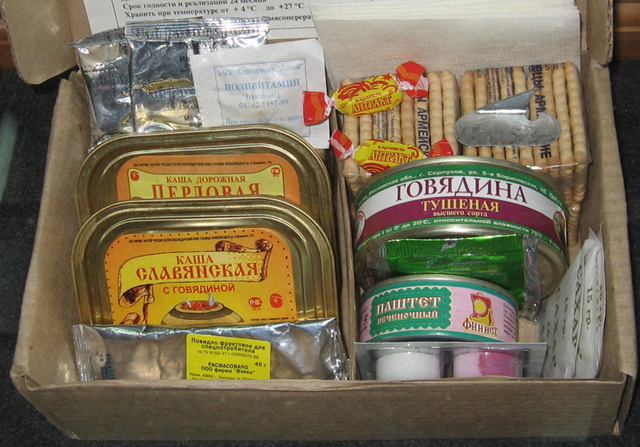
An IRP-P Russian Navy combat ration, with main courses, meat spreads, crackers and drinks

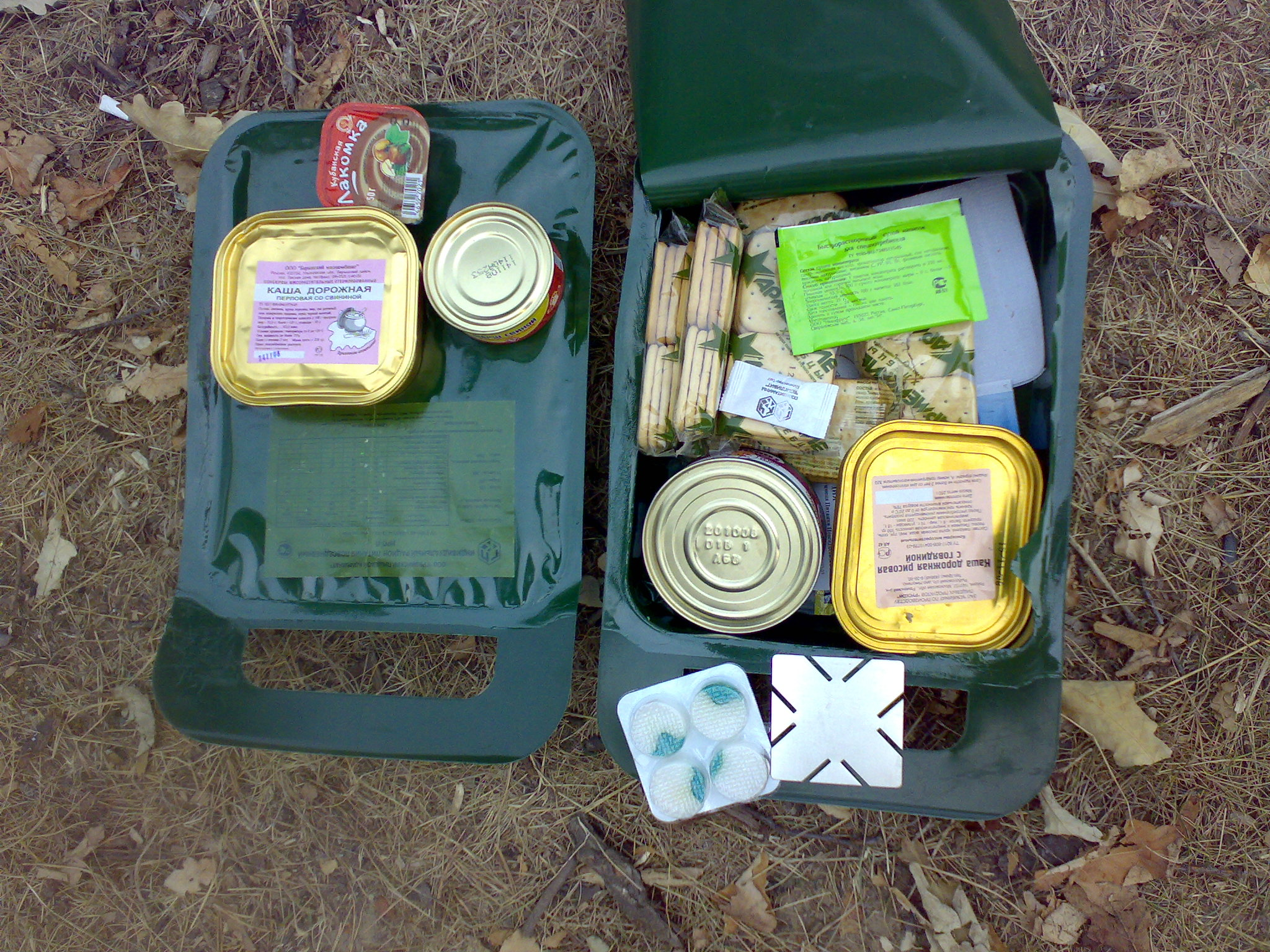
Russian combat ration IRP-P (other version, the so-called "Frog")

Since the turn of the millennium, the Russian Armed Forces have been issued the Individual Food Rations (Russian: Индивидуальный рацион питания/ИРП, romanized: Individual'nyi Ratsion Pitaniya (IRP)), a new self-contained ration, containing the whole daily food intake for an individual soldier in the field. However, in its most frequent form it is not dietary complete, and is intended only as a stop-gap measure to be issued until the normal supply lines (with their field kitchens) are established and the hot food delivery started, to be issued for no more than six days straight. The Ministry of Defence does not strictly prescribe the contents of the ration, only some basic packaging and inventory requirements, so every producer issues their own version.

Most commonly it is packaged into a sturdy plastic blister box (nicknamed "The Frog" in the field for its olive-green color), or plastic-sealed cardboard box that contains five to six entrees in laminated foil cans or retort pouches, four to six pack of crackers or preserved bread, two to three dessert items in form of a spread or fruit bar, four beverage concentrate pouches, some seasonings (salt, pepper, sugar, ketchup), and various sundry items like sanitizing wipes/paper towels, spoons, can opener, four hexamine fuel tablets, folding heater, matches and water purifier tablets. The types of entrees vary with the producer and the issued menu (of which there are usually 7 to 12), but the common set is based on a traditional Russian outdoorsmen fare, is largely formed out of the commercially available canned food, and usually includes 1 portion of stewed beef or pork, two meat-with-vegetables dishes, like various porridges, stews or canned fish, and one or two spreads, such as liver pâté, sausage stuffing or processed cheese. Desserts may include fruit jams, chocolate and/or walnut spreads, chocolate bars, sweetened condensed milk, etc., but baked goods are usually avoided out of concerns about their shelf life. Other variants may add canned speck and/or dried fish or exchange the hexamine tablets for the flameless heater.

=== Spain ===
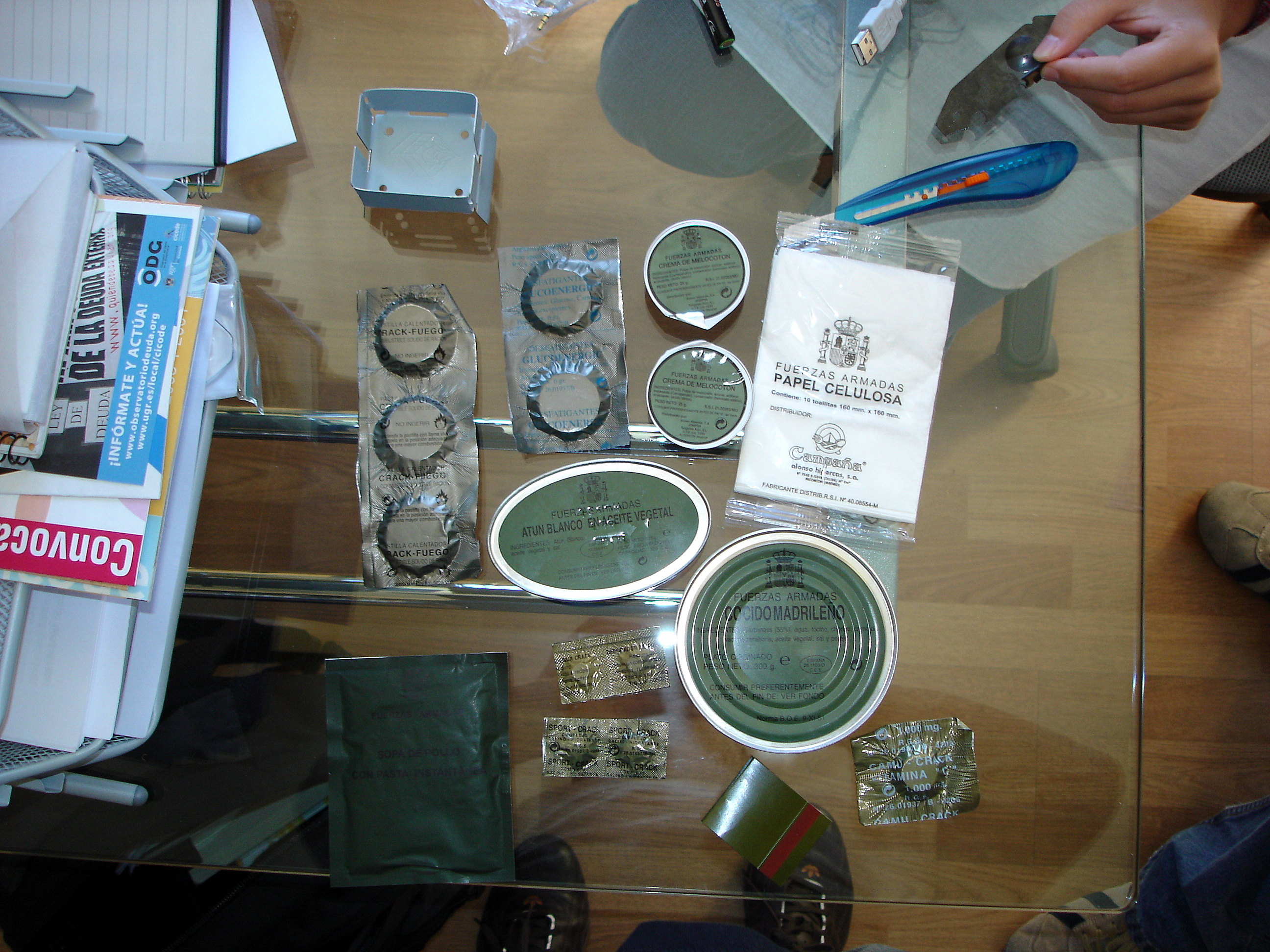
Spanish military ration

The Spanish Armed Forces issues an individual meal pack, available in 5 different menus, comprising a small cardboard box overwrapped with drab green polyethylene. Inside are 3 canned meals, plus accessories. Typical contents (Menu B) include: stewed steak, pickled mackerel, liver pâté with red peppers, an envelope of instant soup, a can of fruit, 2 salt tablets, 2 water purification tablets, a large multivitamin tablet, 10 sheets of general purpose paper, a book of matches, a folding can opener, a small folding ration heater and 2 fuel tablets, and an instruction sheet in three languages (Spanish, English and French). Crackers or bread are issued separately.

=== Sweden ===
The Swedish Armed Forces use ration packs from the Swedish-developed 24 hour meals. 24 hour meals have a long range of menus (approx. 200) and can deliver both freezedried and wet meals. The Swedish concept (combat edition) consists of several versions for different use, in all climate zones, and various types of missions. Examples of different types of rations: 1-course (patrolration), 2-course, 3-course and 4-course versions with a variation of 40 different meals, both wet and dry. The rations varies from 1300 kcal to 5000 kcal. The ration is packed in a transparent durable plastic bag that is resealable with a ziplock. The contents are 1–4 main meals with energy bars, protein bars, nuts, energy drinks, whole wheat bread, peanut butter, desserts and spices for example. The durable bag change size depending on the version for optimal space usage in cartons and soldiers' backpacks. 24 hour meals have been developed at a rapid pace and are currently producing their 5th generation (first in 2008). R&D are working close with soldiers in Scandinavia and various missions around the world.

=== United Kingdom ===
==== 12 Hour Operational Ration Pack ====
The British Armed Forces' 12 hour operational ration pack (ORP) is designed for patrolling for durations of 4–12 hours and is suitable for remote guard posts, drivers and as a supplement to normal rations for where daily calorie expenditure is likely to exceed 6000 kcal (25,120 kJ), for instance, troops undergoing arduous duties.

The 12 hour ORP contains a main meal packed in a retort pouch, a number of snack items, drink powders and a flameless ration heater (FRH). However it does not contain any hot beverage items.

There are 10 menu choices including one vegetarian.

12 Hour Ration Menu
Menu 1	Menu 2	Menu 3	Menu 4	Menu 5	Menu 6 (Vegetarian)	Menu 7	Menu 8	Menu 9	Menu 10
Lunch
BBQ beef sandwich	Italian sausage sandwich	Apple turnover	Maple syrup bun	Cinnamon bun	Marinara soy sandwich	Maple syrup bun	Spicy Chinese soy sandwich	Apple turnover	Plain white bread
Main meal
Spaghetti bolognese	Beef & Cassava	Pork & beef tortellini	Halal chicken & dhal	Chicken tomato pasta	Vegetarian tomato noodle	Beef ravioli in mushroom sauce	Chicken arabbiata	Steak & vegetables	Yellow chicken curry & rice
Snacks
Beef jerky original	Frankfurter sausage	Beef jerky teriyaki	Energize bar vanilla	Beef jerky pepper	Energize bar cherry/cranberry	Energize bar cookies & cream	Energize bar berry	Frankfurter sausage	Frankfurter sausage x 2
Fruity oatie biscuit	Ginger crunch biscuit	Golden oatie biscuit	Oatmeal block	Oreo cookies	Dark choc chip biscuit	Fruity oatie biscuit	Ginger crunch biscuit	Golden oatie biscuit	Oreo cookies
Fruit and nut mix 1	Nuts mix	Vine fruit mix	Salted almonds	Fruit mix	Salted peanuts	Tropical fruit mix	Stone fruit mix	Fruit and nut mix 2	Fruit and nut mix 3
Fruit & nut snack bar	Golden oat bar	Fruit & nut snack bar	Caramel bar	Golden oat bar	Fruit & nut snack bar	Golden oat bar	Fruit & nut snack bar	Golden oat bar	Cranberry bar
Lime sweets	Grapefruit sweets	Blackcurrant sweets	Strawberry sweets	Tootie Frooties	Apple & cinnamon bar Polo mints	Lemon sweets	Apple sweets	Cherry sweets	Lime sweets
Drinks
Raspberry isotonic drink	Orange isotonic drink	Raspberry isotonic drink	Cherry isotonic drink	Exotic isotonic drink	Raspberry isotonic drink	Exotic isotonic drink	Cherry isotonic drink	Orange isotonic drink	Exotic isotonic drink
Peach energy drink	Tropical energy drink	Orange energy drink	Raspberry energy drink	Apple energy drink	Orange energy drink	Lemon energy drink	Apple energy drink	Tropical energy drink	Orange energy drink
Lemon energy drink	Apple energy drink	Blackcurrant energy drink	Sweet cherry energy drink	Raspberry energy drink	Blackcurrant energy drink	Sweet cherry energy drink	Raspberry energy drink	Blackcurrant energy drink	Sweet cherry energy drink
Water flavour orange & cranberry	Water flavour blackcurrant	Water flavour orange & cranberry	Water flavour berry	Water flavour strawberry	Water flavour berry	Water flavour blackcurrant	Water flavour orange & cranberry	Water flavour berry	Water flavour blackcurrant
Water flavour berry	Water flavour raspberry	Water flavour strawberry	Water flavour raspberry	Water flavour blackcurrant	Water flavour orange & cranberry	Water flavour raspberry	Water flavour strawberry	Water flavour raspberry	Water flavour strawberry
Common components
Flameless ration heater ration pouch, Steri tabs x 6, chewing gum-spearmint or peppermint or menthol, reusable polybags x 2, tissues, spoon, wet wipes

The 12 hour ORP provides a minimum of 2000 kcals (8,374 kJ).

==== 24 Hour Operational Ration Pack ====
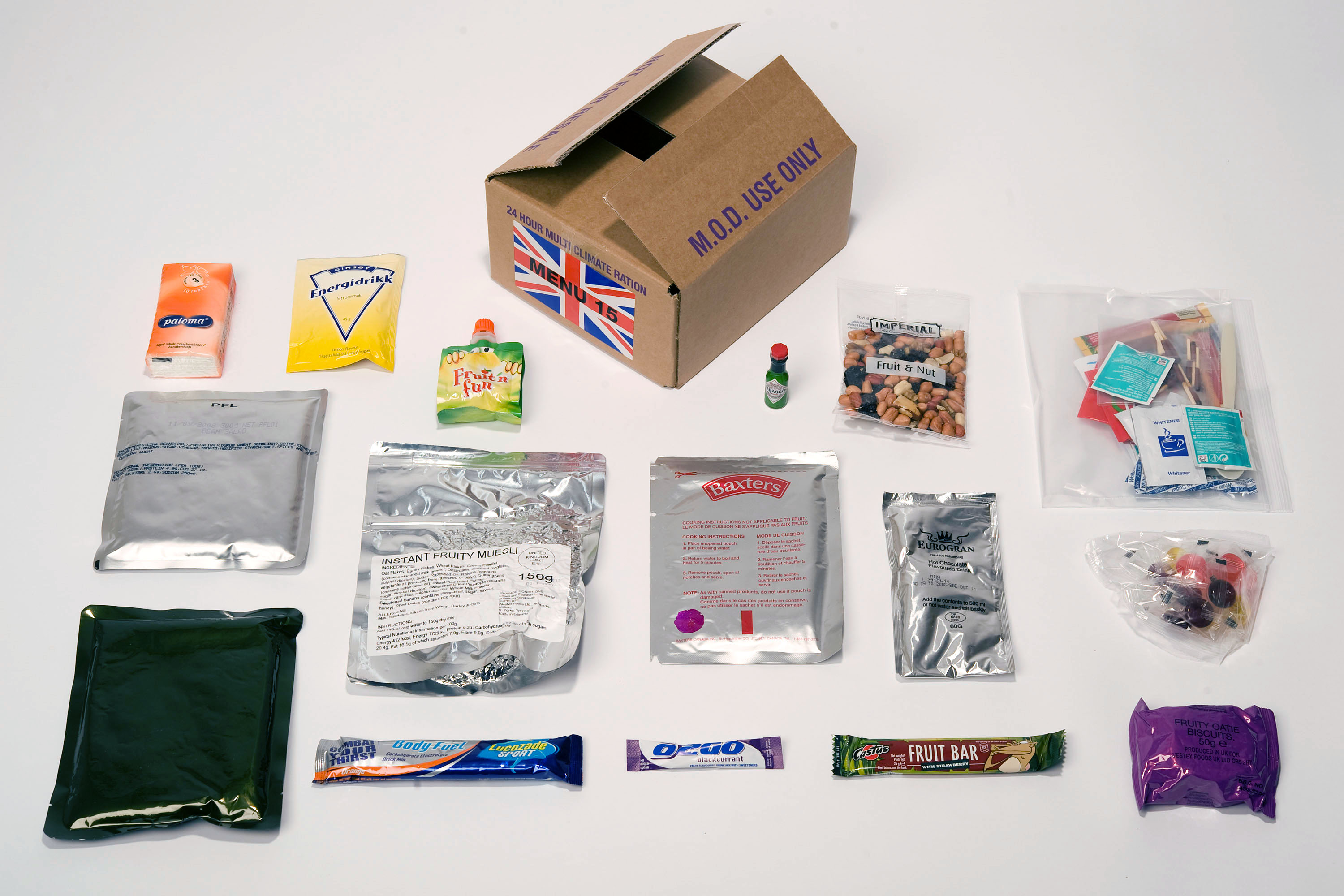
24-hour Multi-Climate Ration Pack for British troops in the Iraq War and War in Afghanistan, 2009

The UK provides the Operational Ration Pack, General Purpose. Packed inside a small cardboard box, each ration has enough retort-pouched and canned foods to feed one soldier for 24 hours. Seven menus (plus vegetarian and religious variants) provide two precooked meals (Breakfast and Main Meal) plus a midday snack. Example (Menu A) Breakfast: Hamburger and beans, Instant Porridge. All ration packs also contain Oatmeal Block, Fruit Biscuits, Biscuits Brown (a more compact alternative to bread), a sachet of instant soup and jam or yeast extract (a Marmite like spread) for a lunchtime snack, and chocolate (in the form of a specially made Yorkie bar which is flatter than civilian bars, or, more recently, a simple unbranded bar of milk chocolate), though this has been phased out with the introduction of the more recent multi-climate ration packs, and boiled sweets (hard candy) for snacking whilst on patrol, or in free time. Main Meal: Instant soup, Chicken with Mushroom and Pasta, Treacle Pudding. Each pack also contains instant coffee, tea bags, creamer, sugar, hot cocoa mix, beef/vegetable stock powder, lemon/orange powder or Lucozade electrolyte powder, matches, packet of tissues, chewing-gum, a small bottle of Tabasco sauce, and water purifying tablets. They sometimes also contain chicken and herb pâté. Also available are Kosher/Halal, Vegetarian, and Hindu/Sikh specific menus. Regardless of their contents, these ration packs are referred to as Rat-Packs or Compo (short for Composite Rations) by the soldiers who eat them. In addition to containing the 24-hour ration, the outside of the cardboard box has a range card printed on its side for use by the soldier to record key features and their range from their position. Other variations designed for specific environments exist.

The rations are issued with a new folding cooker and fire-lighting fuel called FireDragon made in Wales by BCB International Ltd.

==== 24 Hour Multi Climate Ration Box A ====
24 Hour Multi Climate Ration Box A
Menu 1	Menu 2	Menu 3	Menu 4	Menu 5	Menu 6	Menu 7	Menu 8	Menu 9	Menu 10
Breakfast
Strawberry Porridge	Oat Breakfast	Pork Sausage Omelette & Beans	All Day Breakfast	Chicken Sausage & Beans	Natural Muesli	Fruity Muesli	Strawberry Porridge	Fruity Muesli	Toasted Muesli
Main Meal
Steak & Vegetables	Chicken Tikka Masala	Chilli Con Carne	Paella	Beef Ravioli in Mushroom Sauce	Yellow Chicken Curry	Sweet & Sour Chicken	Vegetable Korma	Beef & Cassava	Chicken Arrabbiata
	Pilau Rice	Pilau Rice			Pilau Rice	Pilau Rice	Pilau Rice		
Tabasco Red	Tabasco Green	Tabasco Red	Tabasco Green	Tabasco Red	Tabasco Green	Tabasco Red	Tabasco Green	Tabasco Red	Tabasco Green
Pudding
Fruit Cocktail in Pineapple	Lemon Sponge Pudding	Choc Chip Cake	Rice Pudding w. Jam Sachet	Fruit Cocktail in Light Syrup	Pineapple Tidbits	Sliced Peaches with Syrup	Sliced Pears in Syrup	Sliced Apples	Fruit Cocktail in Pineapple
Snacks
Fruit and Nut Mix		Fruit and Nut Mix	Fruit and Nut Mix	Fruit and Nut Mix			Fruit and Nut Mix	Fruit and Nut Mix	Fruit and Nut Mix
Fruit and Oat Bar	Fruit Mix Bar	Mixed Fruit Grains	Mixed Fruit Grains	Golden Oat Bar	Biscuit & Sultana Flapjack	Caramel Snack Bar	Golden Oat Bar	Cranberry Energy Bar	Strawberry Fruit Bar
Western Tuna Pasta	Chicken & Vegetable Soup	Mexican Tuna Pasta	Ham & Tomato Noodle	Western Tuna Pasta	Pasta Salad	Italian Tuna Pasta	Western Tuna Pasta	Salmon Pasta Salad	Mixed Bean Pasta Salad
Apple Raspberry Blackcurrant Fruit Puree	Strawberry Banana Apple Fruit Puree	Apple Peach Fruit Puree	Kiwi Passion Apple Fruit Puree	Mango Banana Apple Fruit Puree	Mango Banana Apple Fruit Puree	Kiwi Passion Apple Fruit Puree	Apple Peach Fruit Puree	Strawberry Banana Apple Fruit Puree	Apple Raspberry Blackcurrant Fruit Puree
Jammie Dodgers	Oat & Fruit Biscuit	Oreo Cookies	Ginger Biscuits	Ginger Biscuits	Oreo Cookies	Oat & Fruit Biscuit	Jammie Dodgers	Jammie Dodgers	Oat & Fruit Biscuit
Drinks
Exotic Isotonic	Exotic Isotonic	Cherry Isotonic	Lucozade Lemon Isotonic	Lucozade Orange Isotonic	Lucozade Orange Isotonic	Lucozade Lemon Isotonic	Cherry Isotonic	Lemon & Lime Isotonic	Exotic Isotonic
Raspberry Flavour	Berry Flavour	Orange & Cranberry Flavour	Strawberry Flavour	Blackcurrant Flavour	Blackcurrant Flavour	Strawberry Flavour	Orange & Cranberry Flavour	Berry Flavour	Raspberry Flavour
Lemon Energy	Raspberry Energy drink	Lemon Energy	Raspberry Energy drink	Lemon Energy	Lemon Energy	Raspberry Energy drink	Lemon Energy	Raspberry Energy drink	Lemon Energy
Hot Chocolate Original	Hot Chocolate Mint	Hot Chocolate Orange	Hot Chocolate Original	Hot Chocolate Mint	Hot Chocolate Orange	Hot Chocolate Original	Hot Chocolate Mint	Hot Chocolate Orange	Hot Chocolate Original
Common Items
Sugar x 4, Whitener x 4, Kenco Coffee x 2 (sticks), Teabags x 2, Boiled Sweets, Matches, Tissues, Steri Tabs, Wet Wipes x 2, Dental Chewing Gum, Reusable poly bag, Spoon

==== 24 Hour Multi Climate Ration Box B ====
24 Hour Multi Climate Ration Box B
Menu 11	Menu 12	Menu 13	Menu 14	Menu 15	Menu 16	Menu 17	Menu 18	Menu 19	Menu 20
Breakfast
Pork Sausage & Beans	Toasted Muesli	Fruitful Muesli	Bacon Omelette Beans	Fruity Muesli	Natural Muesli	Chicken Sausage & Beans	All Day Breakfast	Sausage Omelette & Beans	Oat Breakfast
Main Meal
Tuna Rigatoni	Chunky Chicken Chilli	Chicken Tomato Pasta	Lamb Curry	Sweet & Sour Chicken	Thai Green Curry - Vegetable (W)	Beef Stroganoff	Green Chicken Curry	Beef Rib & Cassava	Paella
	Pilau Rice		Pilau Rice		Pilau Rice	Pilau Rice	Pilau Rice		
Tabasco Green	Tabasco Red	Tabasco Green	Tabasco Red	Tabasco Green	Tabasco Red	Tabasco Green	Tabasco Red	Tabasco Green	Tabasco Red
Pudding
Lemon Sponge Pudding	Exotic Fruit Cocktail	Sliced Pears in Syrup	Sliced Peaches in Syrup	Pineapple Tidbits	Sliced Apple	Rice Pudding w. Jam Sachet	Chocolate Chip Cake	Fruit cocktail in light syrup	Exotic Fruit Cocktail
Snacks
Fruit and Nut Mix		Fruit and Nut Mix		Fruit and Nut Mix		Fruit and Nut Mix	Fruit and Nut Mix	Fruit and Nut Mix	Fruit and Nut Mix
Caramel Energy Bar	Golden Oat Bar	Cranberry Energy Bar	Caramel Snack Bar	Strawberry Fruit Bar	Apricot Snack Bar	Golden Oat Bar	Caramel Energy Bar	Biscuti & Sultana Flapjack	Fruit & Oat Snack Bar
Tuna Chilli Pasta	Tomato & Basil Soup	Chicken & Vegetable Soup	Tomato & Basil Soup (D)	Bean Pasta Salad	Pasta Salad (B)	Salmon Pasta Salad	Ham & Tomato Noodle	Mexican Tuna Pasta	Italian Tuna Pasta
Apple Raspberry Blackcurrant Fruit Puree	Strawberry Banana Apple Fruit Puree	Apple Peach Fruit Puree	Kiwi Passion Apple Fruit Puree	Mango Banana Apple Fruit Puree	Mango Banana Apple Fruit Puree	Kiwi Passion Apple Fruit Puree	Apple Peach Fruit Puree	Strawberry Banana Apple Fruit Puree	Apple Raspberry Blackcurrant Fruit Puree
Oreo Cookies	Ginger Biscuits	Ginger Biscuits	Oreo Cookies	Oat & Fruit Biscuit	Oreo Cookies	Jammie Dodgers	Jammie Dodgers	Jammie Dodgers	Ginger Biscuits
Drinks
Exotic Isotonic	Lemon & Lime Isotonic	Cherry Isotonic	Lucozade Lemon Isotonic	Lucozade Orange Isotonic	Lucozade Orange Isotonic	Lucozade Lemon Isotonic	Cherry Isotonic	Lemon & Lime Isotonic	Lemon & Lime Isotonic
Raspberry Flavour	Berry Flavour	Orange & Cranberry Flavour	Strawberry Flavour	Blackcurrant Flavour	Blackcurrant Flavour	Strawberry Flavour	Orange & Cranberry Flavour	Berry Flavour	Raspberry Flavour
Lemon Energy Drink	Raspberry Energy drink	Lemon Energy Drink	Raspberry Energy drink	Lemon Energy Drink	Lemon Energy Drink	Raspberry Energy drink	Raspberry Energy drink	Raspberry Energy drink	Lemon Energy Drink
Hot Chocolate Original	Hot Chocolate Mint	Hot Chocolate Orange	Hot Chocolate Original	Hot Chocolate Mint	Hot Chocolate Orange	Hot Chocolate Original	Hot Chocolate Mint	Hot Chocolate Orange	Hot Chocolate Original
Common Items
Sugar x 4, Whitener x 4, Kenco Coffee x 2 (sticks), Teabags x 2, Boiled Sweets, Matches, Tissues, Steri Tabs, Wet Wipes x 2, Dental Chewing Gum, Reusable poly bag, Spoon

==== 24 Hour Multi Climate Ration Sikh/Hindu ====
24 Hour Multi Climate Ration Sikh/Hindu
Menu S1	Menu S2	Menu S3	Menu S4	Menu S5	Menu S6
Breakfast
Meat Free Sausage & Beans	Non meat mini burgers & beans	Potato & Beans	Vegetarian All Day Breakfast	Mushroom Omelette	Toasted Muesli
Main Meal
Mexican Bean Feast	Tortellini in Tomato Sauce	Spicy Vegetable Rigatoni	Mexican Rice	Spicy Vegetable Ditallini	Thai Green Vegetable Curry Pilau Rice
Tabasco Red	Tabasco Red	Tabasco Red	Tabasco Red	Tabasco Red	Tabasco Red
Pudding
Sliced Peaches in Syrup	Sliced Apple	Choc Chip Cake	Lemon Sponge Pudding	Sliced Pears	Fruit Cocktail
Snacks
Fruit and Nut Mix	Fruit and Nut Mix	Fruit and Nut Mix	Fruit and Nut Mix	Fruit and Nut Mix	Fruit and Nut Mix
Nut Mix	Nut Mix	Nut Mix	Nut Mix	Nut Mix	Nut Mix
Fruit Grains	Fruit Grains	Oat Bar	Oat Bar	Oat Bar	Fruit Grains
Tomato & Basil Soup	Pasta Salad	Mixed Bean Pasta salad	Vegetarian Ham & Tomato Noodle	Mixed Bean Pasta salad	Pasta Salad
Strawberry Fruit Bar	Apricot Fruit Bar	Mixed Fruit Grains	Berry Fruit Grains	Berry Fruit Grains	Biscuit & Sultana Flapjack
Apple Raspberry Blackcurrant Fruit Puree	Strawberry Banana Apple Fruit Puree	Apple Peach Fruit Puree	Kiwi Passion Apple Fruit Puree	Mango Banana Apple Fruit Puree	Apple Raspberry Blackcurrant Fruit Puree
Jammie Dodgers	Oat & Fruit Biscuit	Oreo Cookies	Ginger Crunch	Ginger Crunch	Oreo Cookies
Drinks
Exotic Isotonic	Lemon & Lime Isotonic	Cherry Isotonic	Lucozade Lemon Isotonic	Lucozade Orange Isotonic	Lucozade Orange Isotonic
Blackcurrant Flavour	Strawberry Flavour	Orange & Cranberry Flavour	Berry Flavour	Raspberry Flavour	Raspberry Flavour
Lemon Energy	Raspberry Energy drink	Lemon Energy	Raspberry Energy drink	Lemon Energy	Raspberry Energy drink
Hot Chocolate Original	Hot Chocolate Mint	Hot Chocolate Orange	Hot Chocolate Original	Hot Chocolate Mint	Hot Chocolate Orange
Common Items
Sugar x 4, Whitener x 4, Kenco Coffee x 2 (sticks), Teabags x 2, Boiled Sweets, Matches, Tissues, Steri Tabs, Wet Wipes x 2, Dental Chewing Gum, Reusable poly bag, Spoon

==== 24 Hour Multi Climate Ration Halal/Kosher ====
24 Hour Multi Climate Ration Halal/Kosher
Menu H1	Menu H2	Menu H3	Menu H4	Menu H5	Menu H6
Breakfast
Meat Free Sausage & Beans	Non meat mini burgers & beans	Potato & Beans	Vegetarian All Day Breakfast	Mushroom Omelette	Toasted Muesli
Main Meal
Chicken & dumpling Casserole	Steak & Vegetables	Lamb Stew	Chicken with Dahl	Lamb Tagine	Thai Green Vegetable Curry Pilau Rice
Tabasco Red	Tabasco Red	Tabasco Red	Tabasco Red	Tabasco Red	Tabasco Red
Pudding
Sliced Peaches in Syrup	Sliced Apple	Choc Chip Cake	Lemon Sponge Pudding	Fruit Cocktail	Sliced Pears
Snacks
Fruit and Nut Mix	Fruit and Nut Mix	Fruit and Nut Mix	Fruit and Nut Mix	Fruit and Nut Mix	Fruit and Nut Mix
Nut Mix	Nut Mix	Nut Mix	Nut Mix	Nut Mix	Nut Mix
Strawberry Fruit Bar	Fruit Grains	Oat Bar	Oat Bar	Cranberry Energy Bar	
Fruit Grains					Fruit Grains
Tomato & Basil Soup	Pasta Salad	Mixed Bean Pasta salad	Vegetarian Ham & Tomato Noodle	Mixed Bean Pasta salad	Pasta Salad (B)
Strawberry Fruit Bar	Apricot Fruit Bar	Mixed Fruit Grains	Berry Fruit Grains	Berry Fruit Grains	Biscuit & Sultana Flapjack
Kiwi Passion Apple Fruit Puree	Apple Peach Fruit Puree	Strawberry Banana Apple Fruit Puree	Apple Raspberry Blackcurrant Fruit Puree	Apple Raspberry Blackcurrant Fruit Puree	Strawberry Banana Apple Fruit Puree
Oat & Fruit Biscuit	Jammie Dodgers	Jammie Dodgers	Oat & Fruit Biscuit	Oreo Cookies	Ginger Crunch
Drinks
Lucozade Lemon Isotonic	Cherry Isotonic	Lemon & Lime Isotonic	Exotic Isotonic	Exotic Isotonic	Lemon & Lime Isotonic
Berry Flavour	Orange & Cranberry Flavour	Strawberry Flavour	Blackcurrant Flavour	Blackcurrant Flavour	Strawberry Flavour
Lemon Energy Drink	Lemon Energy Drink	Raspberry Energy drink	Lemon Energy Drink	Lemon Energy Drink	Raspberry Energy drink
Hot Chocolate Original	Hot Chocolate Mint	Hot Chocolate Orange	Hot Chocolate Original	Hot Chocolate Original	Hot Chocolate Mint
Common Items
Sugar x 4, Whitener x 4, Kenco Coffee x 2 (sticks), Teabags x 2, Boiled Sweets, Matches, Tissues, Steri Tabs, Wet Wipes x 2, Dental Chewing Gum, Reusable poly bag, Spoon

==== 24 Hour Multi Climate Ration Vegetarian ====
24 Hour Multi Climate Ration Vegetarian
Menu V1	Menu V2	Menu V3	Menu V4	Menu V5	Menu V6
Breakfast
Meat Free Sausage & Beans	Non meat mini burgers & beans	Potato & Beans	Vegetarian All Day Breakfast	Mushroom Omelette	Toasted Muesli
Main Meal
Mexican Bean Feast	Tortellini in Tomato Sauce	Spicy Vegetable Rigatoni	Mexican Rice	Spicy Vegetable Ditallini	Thai Green Vegetable Curry Pilau Rice
Tabasco Red	Tabasco Red	Tabasco Red	Tabasco Red	Tabasco Red	Tabasco Red
Pudding
Sliced Peaches in Syrup	Sliced Apple	Choc Chip Cake	Lemon Sponge Pudding	Sliced pears	Fruit Cocktail
Snacks
Fruit and Nut Mix	Fruit and Nut Mix	Fruit and Nut Mix	Fruit and Nut Mix	Fruit and Nut Mix	Fruit and Nut Mix
Nut Mix	Nut Mix	Nut Mix	Nut Mix	Nut Mix	Nut Mix
Strawberry Fruit Bar	Fruit Grains	Oat Bar	Oat Bar	Cranberry Energy Bar	
Tomato & Basil Soup	Pasta Salad	Mixed Bean Pasta salad	Vegetarian Ham & Tomato Noodle	Mixed Bean Pasta salad	Pasta Salad (B)
Strawberry Fruit Bar	Apricot Fruit Bar	Mixed Fruit Grains	Berry Fruit Grains	Berry Fruit Grains	Biscuit & Sultana Flapjack
Apple Peach Fruit Puree	Kiwi Passion Apple Fruit Puree	Mango Banana Apple Fruit Puree	Mango Banana Apple Fruit Puree	Kiwi Passion Apple Fruit Puree	Apple Peach Fruit Puree
Ginger Crunch	Oreo Cookies	Oat & Fruit Biscuit	Jammie Dodgers	Jammie Dodgers	Oat & Fruit Biscuit
Drinks
Cherry Isotonic	Lucozade Lemon Isotonic	Lucozade Orange Isotonic	Lucozade Orange Isotonic	Lucozade Lemon Isotonic	Cherry Isotonic
Orange & Cranberry Flavour	Berry Flavour	Raspberry Flavour	Berry Flavour	Orange & Cranberry Flavour	Strawberry Flavour
Lemon Energy Drink	Raspberry Energy drink	Lemon Energy Drink	Lemon Energy Drink	Raspberry Energy drink	Raspberry Energy drink
Hot Chocolate Orange	Hot Chocolate Original	Hot Chocolate Mint	Hot Chocolate Orange	Hot Chocolate Original	Hot Chocolate Mint
Common Items
Sugar x 4, Whitener x 4, Kenco Coffee x 2 (sticks), Teabags x 2, Boiled Sweets, Matches, Tissues, Steri Tabs, Wet Wipes x 2, Dental Chewing Gum, Reusable poly bag, Spoon

==== 24 Hour Jungle Ration (no longer available) ====
The 24 Hour Jungle ration is based on the standard 24 Hour ration with additional supplements and a Flameless Ration Heater (FRH). The Jungle ration is designed for use by the special forces and other specialist units.

The 24 Hour Jungle Ration provides a minimum of 4500 kcals (18,840 kJ) a day.

==== Cold Climate Ration ====
The Cold Climate Ration (CCR) is a specialist and lightweight, high calorie 24 hour ration designed for use by troops above the snow line or in the high Arctic. It comprises mainly dehydrated main meals with a range of snacks designed to be eaten on the go.

There are 8 menu choices available.

The cold climate ration provides a minimum of 5500 kcals (23,030 kJ) a day.

==== 10 Man Operational Ration Pack ====
The UK also fields a larger pack of rations intended to feed ten soldiers for 24 hours from centralised but basic preparation; generally similar in content to the single issue ORP but tending to contain larger quantities of food in cylindrical tin cans to be divided up on preparation, rather than individual retort pouches or packets. Even dry materials like sugar or biscuits are often packed in these cans. They contain ingredients for baking bread and tinned food, including vegetables, corned beef and sausages in lard. Also included are chocolate, pre-cooked chicken or beef in gravy and soya mince. Ten boxed one-man ORPs are supplied in larger boxes identical in shape to the single ten-man pack.

==== 10 Man Operational Ration Pack Menus A-E ====
10 Man Operational Ration Pack Menus A-E
Menu A	Menu B	Menu C	Menu D	Menu E
Breakfast
Porridge Oats Bacon Grill Baked Beans In Tomato Sauce Sausages In Veg Oil Egg Substitute Strawberry Jam	Porridge Oats Bacon Grill Baked Beans In Tomato Sauce Sausages In Veg Oil Egg Substitute Wild Berry Jam	Porridge Oats Bacon Grill Baked Beans In Tomato Sauce Sausages In Veg Oil Egg Substitute Apricot Jam	Porridge Oats Bacon Grill Baked Beans In Tomato Sauce Sausages In Veg Oil Egg Substitute Orange Marmalade Jam	Porridge Oats Bacon Grill Baked Beans In Tomato Sauce Sausages In Veg Oil Egg Substitute Raspberry Jam
Main Meal
Chicken In White Sauce Long Grain Rice Potato Flakes Garden Peas Whole Carrots Fruit Cocktail Instant Custard	Pasta Spirals Minced Beef With Gravy Potato Flakes Garden Peas Sweetcorn Strawberry Sponge Cake Instant Custard	Minced Beef With Gravy Potato Flakes Long Grain Rice Chopped Tomatoes Red Kidney Beans Fruit Cocktail Instant Custard	Stewed Steak In Gravy Potato Flakes Pasta Spaghetti Chopped Tomatoes Sweetcorn Chocolate Sponge Cake Instant Custard	Chicken In White Sauce Potato Flakes Long Grain Rice Whole Carrots Mushrooms Pineapple Slices Instant Custard
Snacks
Beef Noodles Tuna Chunks In Veg Oil Cheddar Cheese Fruit & Nut Mix Milk Chocolate Bar Mixed Fruit Sweets	Tuna Chunks In Veg Oil Cheddar Cheese Sweet & Sour Rice Tropical Fruit Mix Milk Chocolate Bar Mixed Fruit Sweets	Pork Luncheon Meat Chicken & Mushroom Pasta Cheddar Cheese Fruit Mix Milk Chocolate Bar Mixed Fruit Sweets	Cheddar Cheese Balti Rice Corned Beef Milk Chocolate Bar Castus Bar Apricot Mixed Fruit Sweets	Chicken Noodles Cheddar Cheese Canned Ham Milk Chocolate Bar Castus Bar Strawberry Mixed Fruit Sweets
Drinks
Freeze Dried Coffee Tropical Drink Powder Drinking Chocolate Original Milk Powder Semi Skimmed Tea Bags Granulated Sugar Lemon Drink Powder	Freeze Dried Coffee Tropical Drink Powder Drinking Chocolate Original Milk Powder Semi Skimmed Tea Bags Granulated Sugar Orange Drink Powder	Freeze Dried Coffee Tropical Drink Powder Drinking Chocolate Orange Milk Powder Semi Skimmed Tea Bags Granulated Sugar Lemon Drink Powder	Freeze Dried Coffee Tropical Drink Powder Drinking Chocolate Mint Milk Powder Semi Skimmed Tea Bags Granulated Sugar Orange Drink Powder	Freeze Dried Coffee Tropical Drink Powder Drinking Chocolate Mint Milk Powder Semi Skimmed Tea Bags Granulated Sugar Orange Drink Powder
Sauces/Soups
Balti Sauce Beef & Tomato Soup	Bolognaise Sauce Mulligatawny Soup	Chilli Sauce Chicken Soup	Bourgignon Sauce Thick Veg Soup	Jerk Sauce Mushroom Soup
Chef's Pack Ingredients
Bicarbonate Of Soda, Strong White Flour – 500 g, Garlic Powder, Pepper, Salt, Tomato Puree/ Powder, Soya Mince, Yeast, Margarine, Dried Onions, Mixed Herbs

==== Emergency Flying Rations (EFR) Mark 4 ====
The Mark 4 EFR is designed for crews of fast jets. It consists of a flat tin it contains 100 g of fruit flavoured sweets, (9 to be eaten each day) 2 spring handles and a plastic bag. The container can be used for boiling water and hot drinks can be made by dissolving the sweets in hot water. The Mark 4 EFR is built into ejector seats.

==== Emergency Flying Rations (EFR) Mark 9 ====
The Mark 9 EFR is designed for crews of multi-engine aircraft. It consists of a two-piece aluminium container, four wire spring handles, two emergency food packs (eight portions per pack), one packet of beef stock drinking cubes (six cubes per pack), two packets of sugar cubes (twelve cubes per pack), one beverage pack (containing seven sachets of instant coffee, four sachets of instant tea and seven sachets of vegetable creamer), two spatulas, one polythene bag and an instruction leaflet.

==== Costs of rations ====
The cost of a 10-man ration pack is £55.00. The cost of a 24-hour operational ration pack is £10.00

==== Earlier British rations ====
===== 1940s =====
In 1943, the 24 Hour Ration was devised as a direct replacement to the 48 Hour Mess tin ration. It contained only dried goods (no tins), to save weight and tinplate, which was the criticism of the earlier mess tin ration. It was first issued to troops on D-Day to provide interim food prior to supply lines being established which would permit 14 Man Composition Rations being brought ashore.

There were two packs (contents identical), the standard 24 Hour Ration and the 24 Hour Ration (Assault), the former fitting into the larger portion of the mess tin and the latter fitting into the smaller portion. The pack provided approximately 4000 calories. The contents of the ration pack were as follows, most of which were wrapped in either cellophane or in white, heat-sealed wax paper with royal blue writing:

1 block of dried meat (beef or lamb), 2 sweetened oatmeal blocks, tea, milk and sugar cubes, 10 biscuits (plain, service), 2 bars of raisin chocolate, 1 bar of vitamin enriched chocolate (vit. A, B, C, D and calcium), 4 ounces (110 g) of boiled sweets, 2 packets of peppermint chewing gum, 4 meat extract cubes, 4 cubes of sugar, salt, 4 sheets of latrine paper.

===== 1970s =====
The 24 hour GS (General Service) ration pack was supplied with the contents in cans or packets.

24 Hour GS Ration Pack
Menu A	Menu B	Menu C	Menu D
Breakfast
Oatmeal block Sausage & beans Biscuits AB* Jam Tea and sugar	Oatmeal block Bacon grill Biscuits AB Jam Tea and sugar	Oatmeal block Sausage & beans Biscuits AB Jam Tea and sugar	Oatmeal block Baconburger Biscuits AB Jam Tea and sugar
Snack
Biscuits AB Cheese Chocolate Spangles Coffee Sugar	Biscuits AB Beef Spread Chocolate Boiled sweets Coffee Sugar	Biscuits AB Cheese Chocolate Confectionery bar Coffee Sugar	Biscuits AB Beef spread Chocolate Spangles Coffee Sugar
Main meal
Onion soup Chicken curry Pre-cooked rice Apple flakes Tea and sugar Biscuits AB	Oxtail soup Steak & kidney pudding Spaghetti in tomato sauce Fruit salad Tea and sugar Biscuits AB	Oxtail soup Corned beef Beans in tomato sauce Ginger pudding Tea and sugar Biscuits AB	Mock turtle soup Minced steak Macedoine Chocolate pudding Tea and sugar Biscuits AB
Sundries
Condensed milk (in tube), chewing gum, toilet paper, salt, matches, can opener, margarine (in tube)

*Biscuits AB stands for "Biscuits-Alternative Bread", these were called more colourful names by members of the British Army due to the fact they caused constipation.

===== 1980s =====
The 24 hour GS (General Service) ration pack was supplied with the contents in cans or packets.

24 Hour GS Ration Pack
Menu A	Menu B	Menu C	Menu D
Breakfast
Porridge Bacon Grill Biscuits Brown Chocolate Drink	Porridge Bacon Burger Biscuits Brown Chocolate Drink	Porridge Bacon Grill Biscuits Brown Chocolate Drink	Porridge Bacon Burger Biscuits Brown Chocolate Drink
Snack
Biscuits Brown Ham Spread Chocolate Full Cream Spangles Chocolate Covered Caramel Dextrose Tablets (Lemon)	Biscuits Brown Beef Spread Chocolate Full Cream Boiled Sweets Chocolate Covered Caramel Dextrose Tablets (Orange)	Biscuits Brown Chicken Spread Chocolate Full Cream Confectionery Bar Chocolate Covered Caramel Dextrose Tablets (Lemon)	Biscuits Brown Chicken & Bacon Spread Chocolate Full Cream Spangles Chocolate Covered Caramel Dextrose Tablets (Orange)
Main Meal
Biscuit Fruit Filled Instant Soup Chicken Curry Pre-cooked Rice Apple Flakes	Biscuit Fruit Filled Instant soup Steak & kidney Pudding Spaghetti in Tomato Sauce Apple & Apricot Flakes	Biscuit Fruit Filled Instant Soup Steak & Onion Casserole Beans in Tomato Sauce Fruit Salad	Biscuit Fruit Filled Instant Soup Minced Steak Mixed vegetables Mixed Fruit Pudding
Drinks
Instant Skimmed Milk, Sugar, Tea, Coffee, Beef Stock Drink and Orange/ Lemon Powder.
Sundries
Chewing Gum, Toilet Paper, Salt, Book matches, Waterproof matches, Can Opener, Water Purification tablets and Menu Sheet

===== Arctic Rations =====
Arctic rations were dehydrated and issued to troops serving in arctic areas where snow could be melted to rehydrate the dehydrated contents.

24 Hour Arctic Ration Pack
Menu A	Menu B	Menu C	Menu D
Breakfast
Porridge Chocolate Drink	Porridge Chocolate Drink	Porridge Chocolate Drink	Porridge Chocolate Drink
Snack
Beef Spread Biscuits Brown Biscuit Fruit Filled Chocolate Full Cream Chocolate Covered Caramel Nuts & Raisins Dextrose Tablets (Lemon) Chocolate Fruit & Nuts	Chicken Spread Biscuits Brown Biscuit Fruit Filled Chocolate Full Cream Chocolate Covered Caramel Nuts & Raisins Dextrose Tablets (Orange) Chocolate Fruit & Nuts	Chicken & Ham Spread Biscuits Brown Biscuit Fruit Filled Chocolate Full Cream Chocolate Covered Caramel Nuts & Raisins Dextrose Tablets (Lemon) Chocolate Fruit & Nuts	Beef Spread Biscuits Brown Biscuit Fruit Filled Chocolate Full Cream Chocolate Covered Caramel Nuts & Raisins Dextrose Tablets (Orange) Chocolate Fruit & Nuts
Main Meal
Instant Soup Beef Granules Potatoes Peas Apple Flakes	Instant Soup Curried Beef Granules Rice Peas Apple & Apricot Flakes	Instant Soup Mutton Granules Potatoes Peas Apple Flakes	Instant Soup Chicken Supreme Granules Rice Peas Apple & Apricot Flakes
Drinks
Instant Skimmed Milk, Sugar, Tea, Coffee, Beef Stock Drink and Orange/Lemon Powder.
Sundries
Chewing Gum, Toilet Paper, Paper Tissues, Salt, Wooden Spatula, Book matches, Matches Waterproof, Can Opener, Water Purification tablets and Menu Sheet

===== 1990s =====
In the 1990s cans were replaced with retort pouches and menu options improved and expanded. The ration was redesignated as the 24 Hour General Purpose (GP) Ration Pack.

24 Hour GP Ration Pack
Menu A	Menu B	Menu C	Menu D	Menu E	Menu F	Menu G
Breakfast
Instant Oats Hamburger & Beans	Instant Oats Corned Beef Hash	Instant Oats Pork Sausage & Beans	Instant Oats Hamburger & Beans	Instant Oats Bacon & Beans	Instant Oats Beefburger & Beans	Instant Oats Pork Sausage & Beans
Snack
Oatmeal Block Fruit Biscuits Brown Biscuits Cheese Spread Milk Chocolate Kendal Mint Cake Boiled Sweets	Oatmeal Block Fruit Biscuits Brown Biscuits Meat Pate Milk Chocolate Mint Flavour Boiled Sweets	Oatmeal Block Fruit Biscuits Brown Biscuits Cheese Spread Chocolate, Biscuit & Fruit Kendal Mint Cake Boiled Sweets	Oatmeal Block Fruit Biscuits Brown Biscuits Meat Pate Milk Chocolate Orange Flavour Chocolate Boiled Sweets	Oatmeal Block Fruit Biscuits Brown Biscuits Cheese Spread Chocolate Orange Crisp Chocolate, Biscuit & Fruit Boiled Sweets	Oatmeal Block Fruit Biscuits Brown Biscuits Meat Pate Chocolate, Biscuit & Fruit Chocolate Mint Crisp Kendal Mint Cake Chocolate, Biscuit & Fruit Boiled Sweets	Oatmeal Block Fruit Biscuits Brown Biscuits Cheese Spread Chocolate Rum & Raisin Boiled Sweets
Main Meal
Soup Chicken, Mushroom and Pasta Treacle Pudding	Soup Beef Stew and Dumplings Chocolate Pudding in Chocolate Sauce	Soup Lamb stew and Potatoes Dumplings in Butterscotch Sauce	Soup Pork Cassoulet Rice Pudding	Soup Lancashire hot Pot Mixed Fruit Pudding	Soup Steak & Vegetable with Potatoes Dumplings in Butterscotch Sauce	Soup Chicken stew with Dumplings Treacle Pudding
Drinks
Chocolate Drink, Beverage Whitener, Sugar, Tea, Coffee, Beef Stock Drink, Orange or Lemon Powder
Sundries
Chewing Gum, Waterproof Matches, Paper Tissues, Paper Tissues, Water Purification Tablets, Menu Sheet

=== Ukraine ===
The Armed Forces of Ukraine's combat ration was based on a previous Russian version, consisting of commercially available cans and dried foods packed together in a sectioned box (resembles a takeout tray) made of very thin green plastic. Inside were: two 250 g mmin meal cans (boiled buckwheat groats and buckwheat w/beef); two 100 g cans of meat spread (liver pâté and beef in lard); a 160 g can of herring or mackerel; six 50 g packages small, hard crackers (resemble oyster crackers); two foil pouches (20 g each) of jam or jelly; six boiled sweets two tea bags; an envelope of instant cherry juice powder; a chicken flavour bouillon cube; two packets of sugar; and three dining packets, each with a plastic spoon, a napkin, and a moist towelette.

In 2018, the Ukrainian military improved their ration contents to be more in line with NATO standards, with different menus for each day in a week. By the Russian invasion of Ukraine, according to a BBC News correspondent who received a field ration from a Ukrainian soldier, the contents of a typical Ukrainian field rations included "wheat porridge with beef; rice and meat soup; beef stew; chicken with vegetables; pork and vegetables; crackers; biscuits; tea bags; coffee; blackcurrant drink; honey; sugar; black pepper; chewing gum; bar of dark chocolate; plastic spoons; [and] moist wipes".

=== Portugal ===
The Portuguese Armed Forces developed and fields the RIC (Portuguese: Ração Individual de Combate). Packed in a camouflage cardboard box measuring 265 mm × 160 mm × 90 mm (10.4 in × 6.3 in × 3.5 in) and weighing 2 kg (4.4 lb), the ration provides 3 meals per day. Maximum use is made of off-the-shelf commercial items, including canned main menu items (still with their original labels). A typical RIC (menu 4) contains: two 415 g "poptop" cans (beef with vegetables and chili con carne), a flat 115 g can of sardines, round 65 g can of liver paste, sweet bread, crackers, packaged bread, 2 pouches of fruit jam, pouch of quince cream, hot chocolate or instant coffee, isotonic drink mix, instant milk powder, chewing gum, boiled sweets, sugar, salt, water purification tablets, matches, 6 fuel tablets, a folding stove, plastic cutlery, a pack of tissues, a plastic bag, and an instruction/menu sheet.

== Middle East ==
=== Iran ===
Regular army and IRGC MREs include canned meat, wheat soup, haleem and halvardeh.

=== Israel ===
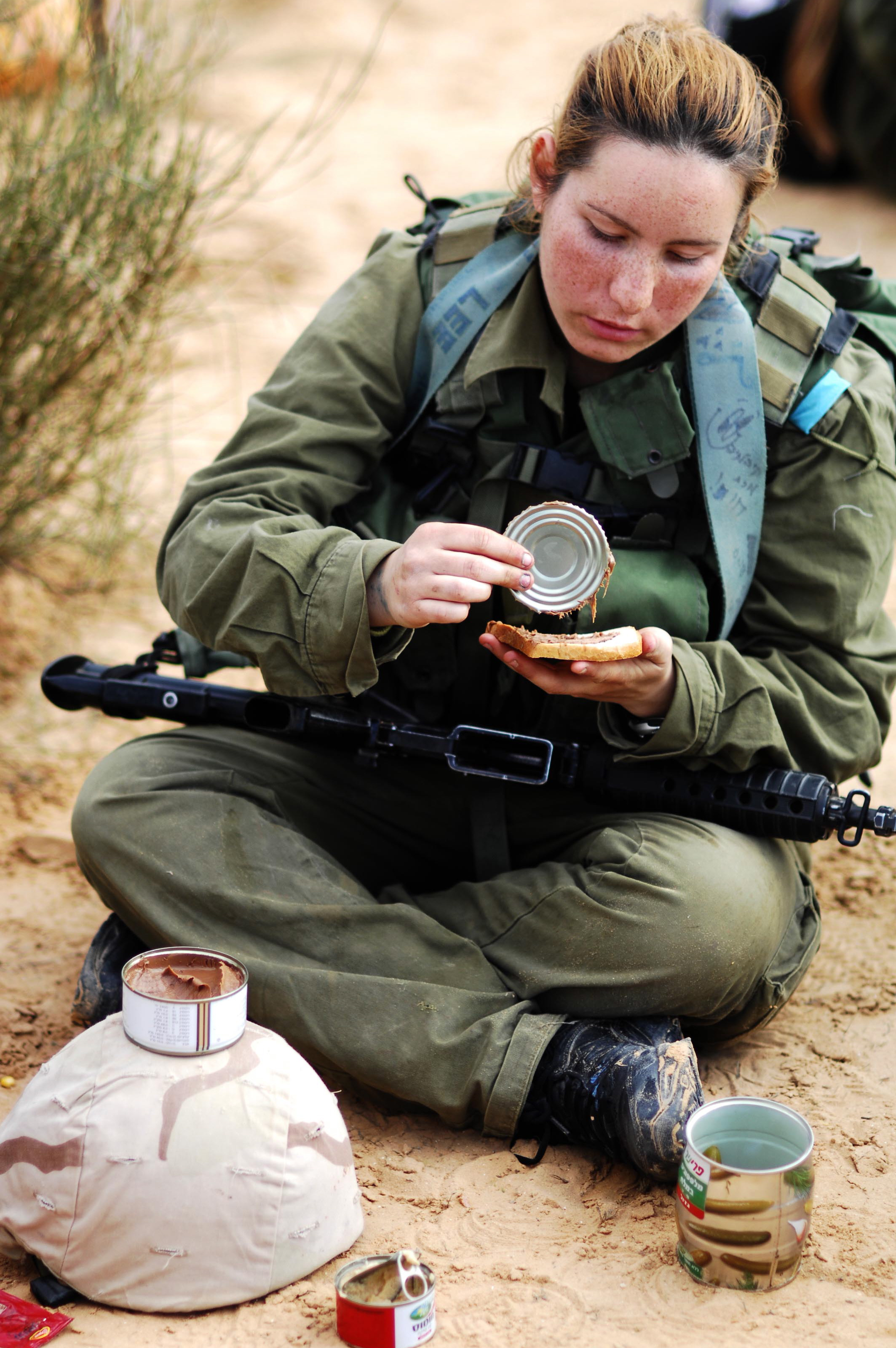
An IDF soldier eating a battle ration

The Israel Defense Forces "battle ration" (Manat Krav) is designed to be shared by four soldiers. It contains 1 can of rice filled vine leaves, 8 small cans of tuna, canned olives, a can of sweet corn, a can of pickled cucumbers, 1 can of halva spread and 1 chocolate spread, a can of peanuts, fruit flavored drink powder, and bread or matzoh crackers. There is also an "ambush pack" of candy and high-energy protein bars.

In 2008, Israel introduced a new field ration to supplement the traditional Manat Krav. Unlike previous rations, the new Battle Ration consists of individual, self-heating, ready-to-eat meals packed inside plastic-aluminum trays. They are designed to be carried and used by infantry troops for up to 24 hours, until regular supply lines can be established. Ten menus are available, including chicken, turkey and kebab; each meal pack is supplemented with dry salami, dried fruit, tuna, halva, sweet roll, and preserved dinner rolls. However, as of 2012, the older rations were still in use.

In 2011, as a result of the manufacturer going bankrupt, the IDF phased out the can of corned beef (known as 'Loof'), which had been part of the battle ration since the nation's founding. It would be replaced by "ground meat with tomato sauce".

Many different recipes and different ways of serving the rations have developed in Israel. With the can of tuna, for example, traditionally cooked using toilet paper soaked in oil.

=== Saudi Arabia ===
The Armed Forces of Saudi Arabia uses a combat meal that is packed inside a brown plastic bag about the size and shape of an American MRE pouch. It contains a small can of tuna, a small can of sardines or salmon or beef, a small can of cheese or thickened cream, an envelope of instant noodle soup, hard crackers and dry toast (like Zwieback), a small bag of raisins or dried fruit, a small package of dates, a small bag of nuts, plus instant coffee, tea bags, sugar packets, matches, and a bag of spiced dried chickpea powder.

=== United Arab Emirates ===
The United Arab Emirates Armed Forces uses a European-style combat ration pack containing food and accessories for one soldier for 24 hours. Packed in the UAE using imported components, the ration box measures 245 mm × 195 mm × 115 mm and weighs 2.0 kg. Inside are 4 resealable (ziplock type) plastic bags, labeled in both Arabic & English, containing Breakfast, Lunch, Dinner, and Miscellaneous.

A typical Breakfast bag has 2 foil-wrapped packages of hard brown biscuits, 1 small jar of apricot jam, a can of tuna, and an accessory pack (plastic spoon, salt, pepper, and napkin).

Lunch contains a retort pouch of precooked rice, a retort pouch of chicken curry, a pouch of date pudding, and another accessory pack.

Dinner has a retort pouch of pasta rigatoni, an envelope instant soup, and a third accessory pack.

The Miscellaneous bag contains a small bag of hard candy, 4 packets of sugar, 4 tea bags, 2 small envelopes of milk powder, and 3 foil envelopes of instant orange juice powder.

Also included are: a can of fruit, a package of ramen noodles, 2 flameless chemical ration heaters, a menu/instruction sheet, 1 pack of dried hummus powder, and a book of matches.

== Oceania ==
=== Australia ===
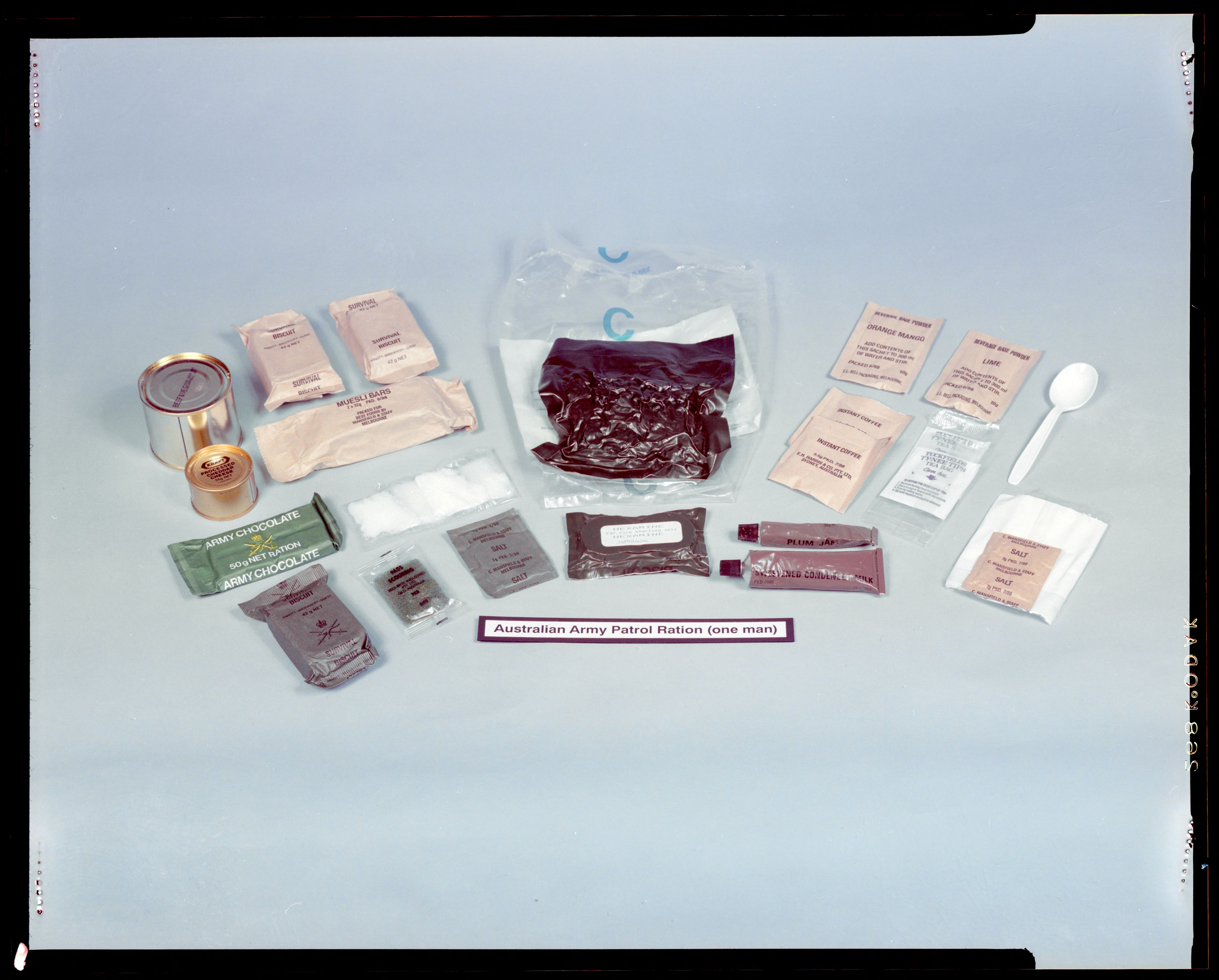
An Australian Patrol Ration One Man, pictured by the U.S. Army Natick Soldier Systems Center in the 1980s or 1990s

The Australian Defence Force currently supplies three different types of military ration packs – Combat Ration One Man, Combat Ration Five Man and Patrol Ration One Man.

Combat Ration One Man is a complete 24-hour ration pack that provides two substantial meals per day and a wide variety of drinks and snacks for the remainder of the day. Most items, such as Beef Kai Si Ming, Dutch-style Beef with Vegetables, Beef with Spaghetti, Baked Beans, Sausages with Vegetables, or Chicken with pasta and vegetables, are packed in 250 gram sized plastic-foil retort pouches. Included with every meal pack is a pouch of instant rice or instant mashed potatoes, a fruit and grain bar, 2 envelopes of instant drink powder, some biscuits, an "Anzac Biscuit", a chocolate bar, M&M's, coffee, tea, sugar, crackers, cheese spread, jam, sweetened condensed milk, hard sweets, and Vegemite. It is packed in a tough clear polyethylene bag and weighs around 1.5–1.7 kg (3.3–3.7 lb). In practical use, these packs are "stripped" by removing and trading with other soldiers, those components that are unlikely to be consumed by the person carrying the pack. This also reduces the weight of the packs, allowing more to be carried. There are eight menu choices, one of which is vegetarian. None of them are allergen free since Defence Force members are typically selected, among many other attributes, for their no known allergy status.

Combat Ration Five Man contains a similar array of components as the Combat Ration One Man. However, it is provided in a tough fibreboard carton rather than in individual unitised polyethylene bags. It is a group feeding solution, and it is impractical to use on an individual basis for main meals. There are a multiple of group-sized retort pouches – 500 gram as opposed to 250 gram, several of which are required to be heated in order to provide a complete meal. Examples include Beef & Blackbean Sauce, Chicken Satay. Common elements include rice and vegetables such as corn, potatoes and carrots. The accessories such as snacks are consumable and can be carried individually. There are five menu choices, and each Combat Ration Five Man weighs around 10 kg (22 lb).

Patrol Ration One Man is a complete 24-hour ration pack that contains freeze dried main meals, meaning that the total weight of each pack is reduced, however a correspondingly higher quantity of water must be carried in order to reconstitute the main meal. Otherwise, it is similar to the Combat Ration One Man. It is packed in tough clear polyethylene bags and is available in five menu choices.

=== New Zealand ===
The New Zealand Defence Force issues an Operational Ration Pack designed to provide one soldier with three complete meals. Based around two ready-to-eat retort pouches (e.g. Lamb Casserole, Chicken Curry), the ORP comes in 4 menus. Also included are: Anzac biscuits, chocolate bars, URC fruit grains, muesli bars, instant soup powder, instant noodles, muesli cereal, a tube of condensed milk, hard crackers, tinned cheese, cocoa powder, instant coffee, tea bags, instant sport drink powder, sugar, salt, pepper, glucose sweets, Marmite, jam, ketchup, onion flakes, waterproofed matches, a resealable plastic bag, and a menu sheet.

==== Operational Ration Pack 1 Man-24 Hours ====
Operational Ration Pack 1 Man-24 Hours
Menu A	Menu B	Menu C	Menu D
Lamb Casserole 1 x 300 g Beef Ragu 1 x 300 g Anzac Biscuits 1 x 35 g Jam 2 x 13 g Tomato Ketchup 1 x 15 g	Beef Teriyaki 1 x 300 g Chicken Curry 1 x 300 g Chocolate Chip Biscuits 1 x 35 g Marmite 1 x 15 g Tomato Ketchup 1 x 15 g	Chicken Italiano 1 x 300 g Chilli Con Carne 1 x 300 g Anzac Biscuits 1 x 35 g Jam 2 x 13 g Sweet Chilli 1 x 10 g	Mexican Chicken 1 x 300 g Chickpea Curry 1 x 300 g Chocolate Chip Biscuits 1 x 35 g Marmite 1 x 15 g Sweet Chilli 1 x 10 g
Common to all menus
Salt 2 x 1 g, Milk (Tube) 1 x 85 g, Matches Waterproof 1 x vial Tea Bags 3 x bags, Coffee Instant 3 x 1.5 g, Chocolate Drink 2 x 11 g, Pad Scouring 1 x pad, Cheese Canned 1 x 56 g, Muesli Cereal 1 x 100 g, Sports Drink 1 x 16 g, Cabin Bread 1 x 34 g, Soup Powder 1 x 25 g, Pepper 2 x 1 g, Instant Noodles 1 x 85 g, Menu Sheet 1 x ea, Bags Plastic 1 x bag, Sugar 6 x 7 g, Recaldent Gum 1 x pkt, Chocolate 2 x 40 g, Towelettes 6 x wipes, Onion Flakes 1 x 7 g, Glucose Sweets 1 x 35 g, Peanuts and Raisins 1 x 35 g, Muesli Bar 1 x 32 g, Fruit Bar 1 x 30 g,

The Patrol Ration Pac (PRP) is a shelf-stable product that provides an efficient, flexible and nutritionally robust feeding method. The PRP is designed to cover activities when you have access to other food sources during the day and is ideal to replace a single meal or provide snack options. The PRP provides approximately one-third of the energy and nutrient requirements of most military personnel during moderate, prolonged-intensity physical activity, in a temperate environment. Therefore, it is desirable that all of the food in the pack is eaten.

Menus A, B and C contain main meals that can be heated using a flameless ration heater along with other ready to eat foods and a beverage powder. Menu D provides ready to eat snack foods and no beverage powder.

== Asia ==
=== Brunei ===
The Royal Brunei Armed Forces uses a 24-hour ration pack that provides a soldier with an entire day's supply of food, plus a limited number of health and hygiene items. Maximum use is made of plastic-foil laminate pouches, and most items can be eaten without further preparation. Currently, four menus are fielded, and all menus are compatible with Muslim dietary restrictions. Example Menu (F): 5 x 170-gram retort pouches (Biriani Chicken, Beef Stir Fry, Sardines in Tomato Sauce, Bubur Jagong/ Corn Porridge, Pineapple Pajeri); plus individual servings of pineapple jam, instant coffee, teabags, sugar, salt, pepper, steminder powder, hot chili sauce, MSG, a multivitamin energy tablet, tissue paper, scouring pad with soap, and matches.

=== India ===
The Indian Armed Forces issues a host of rations including the One Man Combo Pack Ration, Mini Combo Pack, Survival Ration, and Main Battle Tank Rations. The shelf-life of the ration is 12 months. India has adopted retort processing technology for combat rations.

The rations use pre-cooked thermostabilized entrees in a plastic-foil laminate retort pouch. The ration does not require cooking and the contents may be eaten cold, though warming is preferred. An entire day's worth of food, plus accessory items, is packed inside a heavy-duty olive green plastic bag with pasted on label. The menu consists of several different Vegetarian and Non-Vegetarian products that cater to Indian tastes, such as sooji halwa, chapatis, tea mix, chicken biryani, chicken curry, Kebab, Tandoori, Panneer, Organic Egg, Butter naan, mutton biryani, Mutton curry, Vegetable biryani, rajma curry, dal fry, jeera rice, Dal makhani, vegetable pulav and mixed vegetable curry, alongside pickled hot seasoning, in small plastic pouches.

The One Man Combo Pack consists of early morning tea, breakfast, mid morning tea, lunch, evening tea, and dinner. The menus feature both dehydrated and ready-to-eat products, and include a folding stove and hexamine fuel tablets. The ration weighs 880 grams and provides 4,100 kcal (17,000 kJ). The Mini Combo Pack is a simplified version of the One Man Combo Pack, weighing 400 g and providing 1,520 kcal (6,400 kJ).

The Survival Ration consists of a soft bar and chikki. The daily survival ration per man consists of: Soft bar 100 g x 2, Chikki (sugar base) 50 g x 3, Chikki (Jaggery base) 50 g x 3. This provides around 2,400 kcal (10,000 kJ), which is 1,520 kcal (6,400 kJ) more than the normal survival ration used by most nations.

The Main Battle Tank Ration is specifically designed for armored vehicle crews. Designed to sustain four soldiers for 72 h in closed-in battle conditions, the MBT ration is based on instant/ready to eat foods and ration/survival bars. First and second day ration packs weigh 2 kg each and provide 4,000 kcal (17,000 kJ) per soldier, while the third day ration pack weighs 1.5 kg and supplies 3,000 kcal (13,000 kJ).

=== Indonesia ===
The Indonesian National Armed Forces (TNI) has introduced the "TNI ration" (Indonesian: Ransum TNI) in the mid-1970s in order to standardize nutrition for soldiers in field. There are three types of ration and each daily ration consist of three menus (breakfast, lunch, and dinner), a pack of supplementary drinks, providing approximately 2,700 kcal (11,000 kJ) in total. The main course are usually meat-based meals (fish, beef, chicken, etc.) with cooked rice. The supplementary drinks are instant coffee, powdered fruit juice or vitamin supply, tea bags and powdered milk. The rations should be heated for 10–15 minutes with the included portable stove and solid fuel tablets (for canned meals), or by submerging in boiling water (for meals packed in retort pouches). All products are made in Indonesia and manufactured according to Indonesian military standard.

=== Japan ===
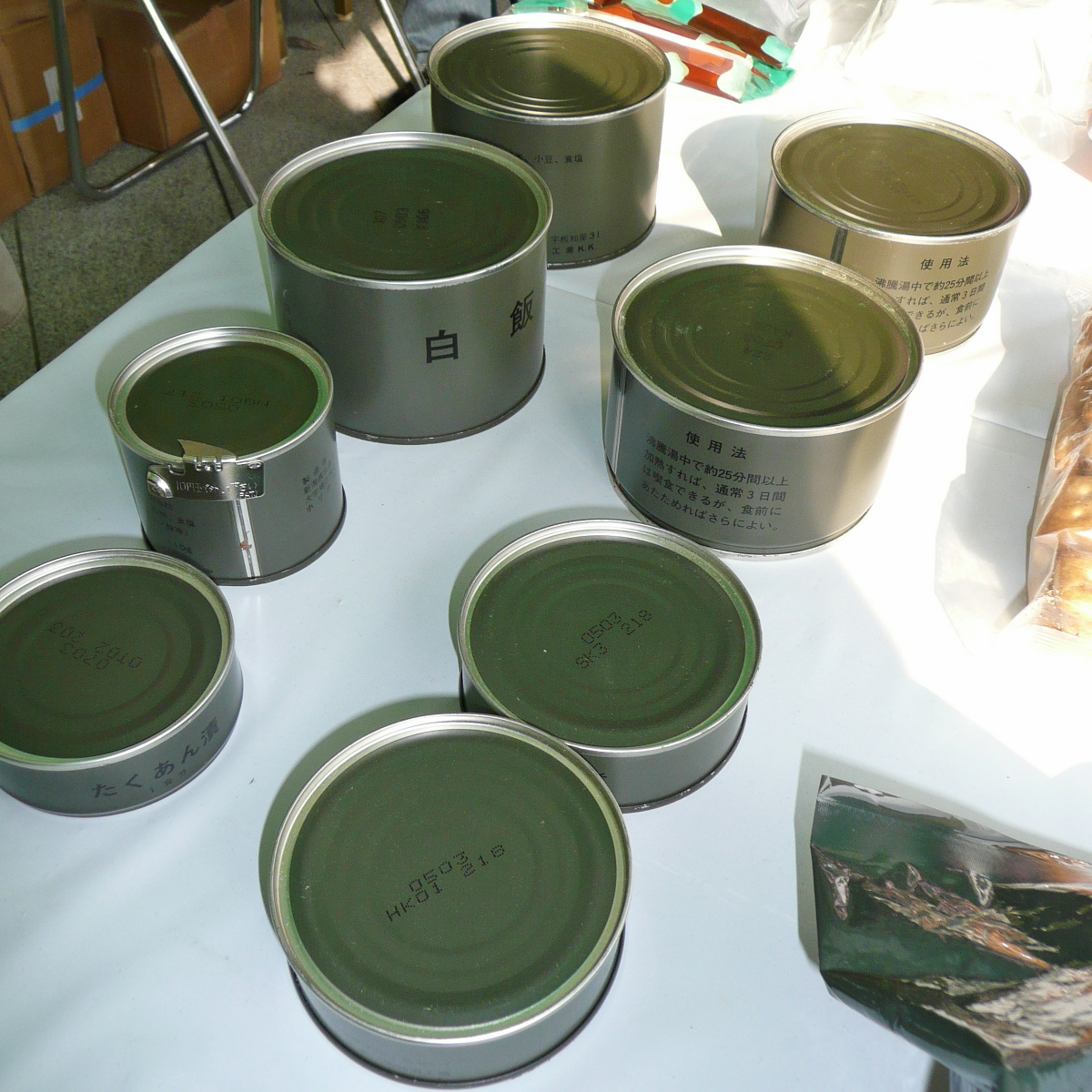
A variety of Type I rations

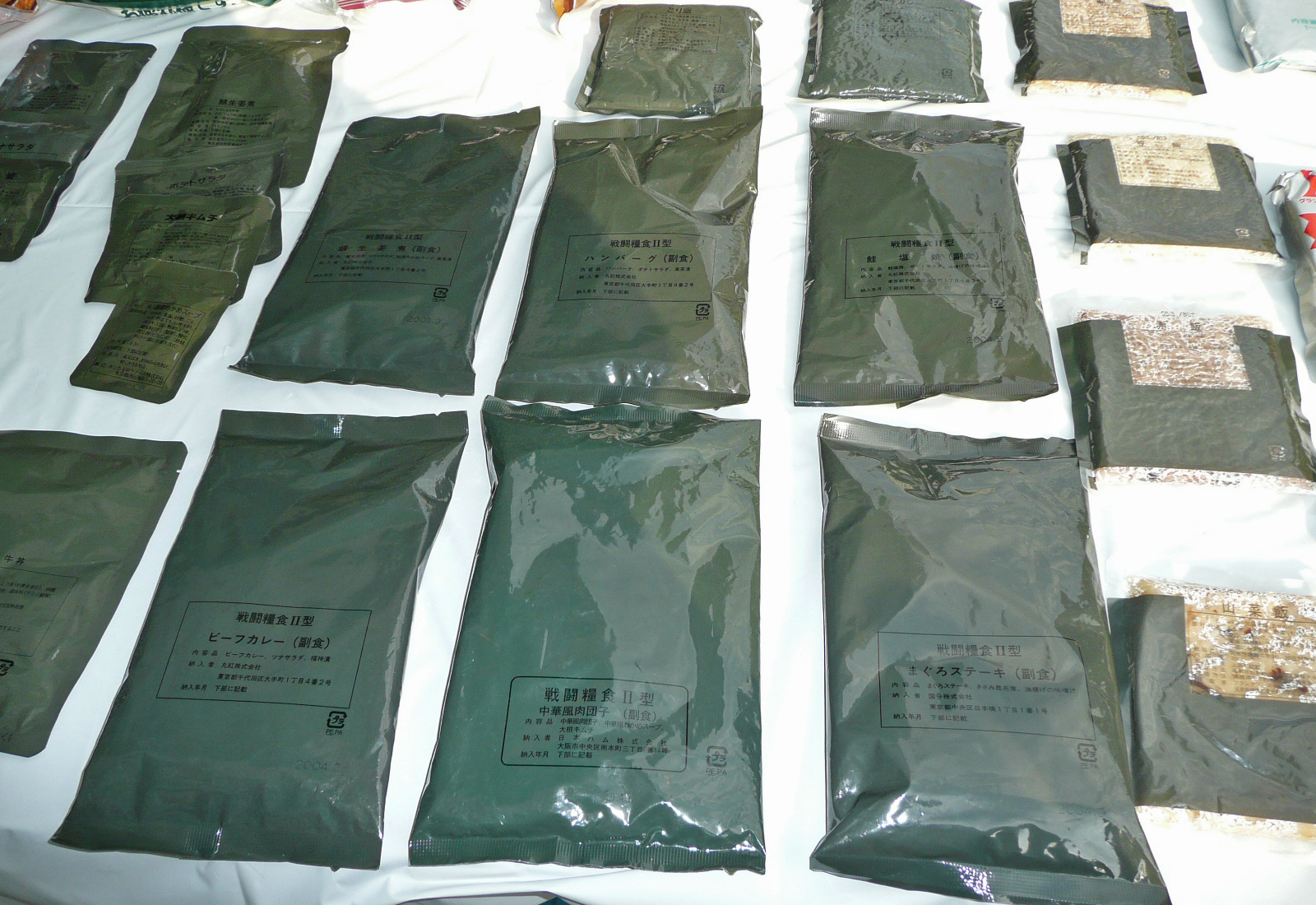
A variety of Type II rations

The Japan Self-Defense Forces use two types of combat rations, Type I combat ration (Japanese: 戦闘糧食 I型) and Type II combat ration (Japanese: 戦闘糧食 II型). The older Type I ration consists almost entirely of canned foods weighing a total of 780 g per meal; a normal three-day ration has up to 36 cans weighing more than 7 kilograms. Eight menus are available, based around a 400 g can of rice and 2–3 smaller supplemental cans. Typical contents include: rice (white rice, sekihan, mixed rice with vegetables, or rice with mushrooms), a main meal can (chicken and vegetables, beef with vegetables, fish and vegetables, or hamburger patties), pickled vegetables (takuan or red cabbage) and sometimes a supplemental can (tuna in soy or beef in soy). In the latest type I combat rations, cans have been replaced by retort pouches.

The newer, lighter Type II ration was originally intended to replace the Type I and consists of pre-cooked, ready-to-eat items in plastic-foil laminate retort pouches, packed in turn inside a drab green polyethylene meal bag. Each meal consists of two 200 g pouches of rice (white rice, rice with red beans, mixed rice with meat and vegetables, fried rice, curried rice pilaf, rice with green peas, or rice with wild herbs) plus 2–3 supplementary pouches. Main meal pouches contain: hamburger patties, frankfurters, beef curry, grilled chicken, Chinese meatballs, Sweet and Sour pork, grilled salmon, yakitori chicken, mackerel in ginger sauce, chicken and vegetables, and tuna. Also included are pouches of pickled vegetables (yellow radish, red cabbage, takana pickles, pickled hari-hari, or bamboo shoots) or salad (potato salad or tuna salad) and instant soup (miso, egg drop, wakame seaweed, or mushroom).

==== Type I Combat Ration (Old) ====
The old model type I combat rations were supplied in cans, with one large can containing the rice portion and 2 or 3 smaller cans containing other portions.

Type I Combat Ration
Menu 1	Menu 2	Menu 3	Menu 4	Menu 5	Menu 6	Menu 7	Menu 8
Small Kanpan Cracker Konpeito Candy Orange Spread Vienna Sausage	White Boiled Rice Chicken And Vegetables Tuna Soy Sauce Flavor Yellow Pickled Radish	Rice Boiled With Red Beans Chicken Giblets And Vegetables Yellow Pickled Radish	Rice Boiled With Red Beans Corned Meat And Vegetable Tuna Soy Sauce Flavor Yellow Pickled Radish	Boiled Rice Mixed With Meat And Vegetables Beef Soy Sauce Flavor Yellow Pickled Radish	Chicken Boiled Rice Beef And Vegetables Yellow Pickled Radish	Chicken Boiled Rice Trout And Vegetables Yellow Pickled Radish	Shiitake Mushroom Boiled Rice Hamburger Red Pickles

==== Type I Combat Ration (New) ====
The new model type I combat ration is supplied in olive drab retort pouches and overwrapped in an olive drab bag.

Type I Combat Ration
Menu 1	Menu 2	Menu 3	Menu 4	Menu 5	Menu 6	Menu 7	Menu 8	Menu 9	Menu 10
Salmon Gomoku Rice Crab Fried Rice Tray Spoon	Saury With Spicy Sauce Chicken 2 x White Boiled Rice Furikake Spoon	Chikuzen-ni (Chicken And Vegetables) White Boiled Rice Gomoku Rice Tray Spoon	Large-sized Kanpan Cracker Frankfurter Tuna Salad Spoon	Bonito With Curry Sauce White Boiled Rice Gomoku Rice Tray Spoon	Mackerel With Tomato Sauce White Boiled Rice Gomoku Fried Rice Tray Spoon	Taco White Boiled Rice Wild Grass Rice Tray Spoon	Yakitori White Boiled Rice Wild Grass Rice Tray Spoon	Chicken And Soybean White Boiled Rice Wild Grass Rice Tray Spoon	Stamina Bowl White Boiled Rice Curried Pilaf Tray Spoon
Menu 11	Menu 12	Menu 13	Menu 14	Menu 15	Menu 16	Menu 17	Menu 18	Menu 19	Menu 20
Pork And Eddoe White Boiled Rice Wild Grass Rice Tray Spoon	Sukiyaki Hamburger Chicken 2 x White Boiled Rice Spoon	Chicken And Hijiki White Boiled Rice Wild Grass Rice Tray Spoon	Duck Stew Mackerel With Ginger Sauce 2 x White Boiled Rice Spoon	Hamburger With Japanese Style Sauce White Boiled Rice Curried Pilaf Tray Spoon	Pork Curry White Boiled Rice Gomoku Fried Rice Tray Spoon	Pork And Roast Chicken White Boiled Rice Curried Pilaf Tray Spoon	Frankfurter Tuna Salad White Boiled Rice Gomoku Fried Rice Tray Spoon	Mapo doufu White Boiled Rice Crab Fried Rice Tray Spoon	Pork Sauteed With Ginger White Boiled Rice Gomoku Fried Rice Tray Spoon

The acquisition cost to the SDF is 554 yen.

==== Type II Combat Ration (Old) ====
Type II Combat Ration
Menu 1	Menu 2	Menu 3	Menu 4	Menu 5	Menu 6	Menu 7	Menu 8	Menu 9	Menu 10
2 White Boiled Rice Hamburger Potato Salad Takana Pickles	Curried Pilaf Boiled Rice Mixed With Meat And Vegetables Frankfurter Instant Wakame Seaweed Soup Red Pickles	2 White Boiled Rice Beef Curry Tuna Salad Red Pickles	2 x Crackers Beef Ham Steak Potato Salad Egg Soup	White Boiled Rice Curried Pilaf Chicken Steak German Potato Salad Egg Soup	2 x White Boiled Rice Chinese Style Bowl Mushroom Soup Seasoned Chinese Bamboo Shoot	White Boiled Rice Fried Rice Mixed With Meat And Vegetables Chinese Style Meatball Chinese Style Wakame Seaweed Soup Japanese Radish Kimchi	White Boiled Rice Crab Fried Rice Sweet And Sour Pork Chinese Style Wakame Seaweed Soup Japanese Radish Kimchi	2 x White Boiled Rice Beef Bowl Instant Wakame Seaweed Soup Red Pickles	Green Pea Boiled Rice Wild Grass Boiled Rice Yakitori (Roast Chicken) Miso Soup With Deep Fried Tofu Hari-Hari Pickles
Menu 11	Menu 12	Menu 13	Menu 14						
Chicken Boiled Rice Rice Boiled With Red Beans Grilled Salmon Potato Salad Miso Soup With Deep Fried Tofu	White Boiled Rice Wild Grass Boiled Rice Mackerel Of The Ginger Taste Potato Salad Instant Wakame Seaweed Soup Red Pickles	White Boiled Rice Wild Grass Boiled Rice Chikuzen-ni (Chicken And Vegetable Of Soy Sauce Flavor) Instant Wakame Seaweed Soup Hari-Hari Pickles	White Boiled Rice Rice Boiled With Red Beans Tuna Steak Sea Tangle Of Soy Sauce Flavor Miso Soup With Deep Fried Tofu						

==== Type II Combat Ration (New) ====
Type II Combat Ration
Menu 1	Menu 2	Menu 3	Menu 4	Menu 5	Menu 6	Menu 7	Menu 8	Menu 9	Menu 10	Menu 11
2 x White Boiled Rice Sardine And Vegetables	White Boiled Rice Wild Grass Boiled Rice Mackerel With Miso Sauce	2 x White Boiled Rice Saury Kabayaki Dried Seaweed	2 x White Boiled Rice Saury With Spicy Sauce Corn Soup	White Boiled Rice Boiled Rice Mixed With Meat And Vegetables Bonito With Curry Sauce	White Boiled Rice Curried Pilaf Mackerel With Tomato Sauce	Small Kanpan Cracker Vienna Sausage Tuna Salad	White Boiled Rice Fried Rice Mixed With Meat And Vegetables Meatball	White Boiled Rice Boiled Rice Mixed With Meat And Vegetables Yakitori (Roast Chicken)	2 x White Boiled Rice Duck Stew Mackerel With Ginger Sauce	2 x White Boiled Rice Chicken And Vegetables Chicken Charcoal Grilled
Menu 12	Menu 13	Menu 14	Menu 15	Menu 16	Menu 17	Menu 18	Menu 19	Menu 20	Menu 21	
White Boiled Rice Wild Grass Boiled Rice Pork Sausage Steak	2 x White Boiled Rice Beef Stew Dried Seaweed	2 x White Boiled Rice Vienna Sausage Curry Chicken Charcoal Grilled	2 x White Boiled Rice Chicken With Tomato Sauce Corn Soup	2 x White Boiled Rice Hamburger With Hayashi Sauce Broiling Chicken	White Boiled Rice Curried Pilaf Vegetable Mabo	2 x White Boiled Rice Pork With AmaKara Sauce	2 x White Boiled Rice Pork Sauteed With Ginger	2 x White Boiled Rice Nagasaki Style Braised Pork Dried Seaweed	White Boiled Rice Rice Boiled With Red Beans Chinese Style Rib Vienna Sausage	

The acquisition cost to the SDF is 329 yen.

=== Malaysia ===
The Malaysian Armed Forces version of the 24-hour ration pack is intended to provide one man with sufficient food and supplements for one day. Most items are domestically procured and cater to local tastes and religious dietary requirements. The ration makes extensive use of commercially available canned and dehydrated items. Wherever possible, plastic-foil pouches are used instead of cans. The ration is supplemented with precooked or freeze-dried rice. Example menu C: Beef Kurma, Chicken Masak Merah, Fish Curry, and Sambal Shrimp; Bean Curd and Vegetable mix; long bean stew; canned pineapple and canned papaya; 2 packages of quick-cooking porridge (black bean porridge and flour porridge); military biscuits; jam; instant coffee; tea; instant milk powder; sugar; salt; vitamin tablets; matches; and napkins.

=== China ===
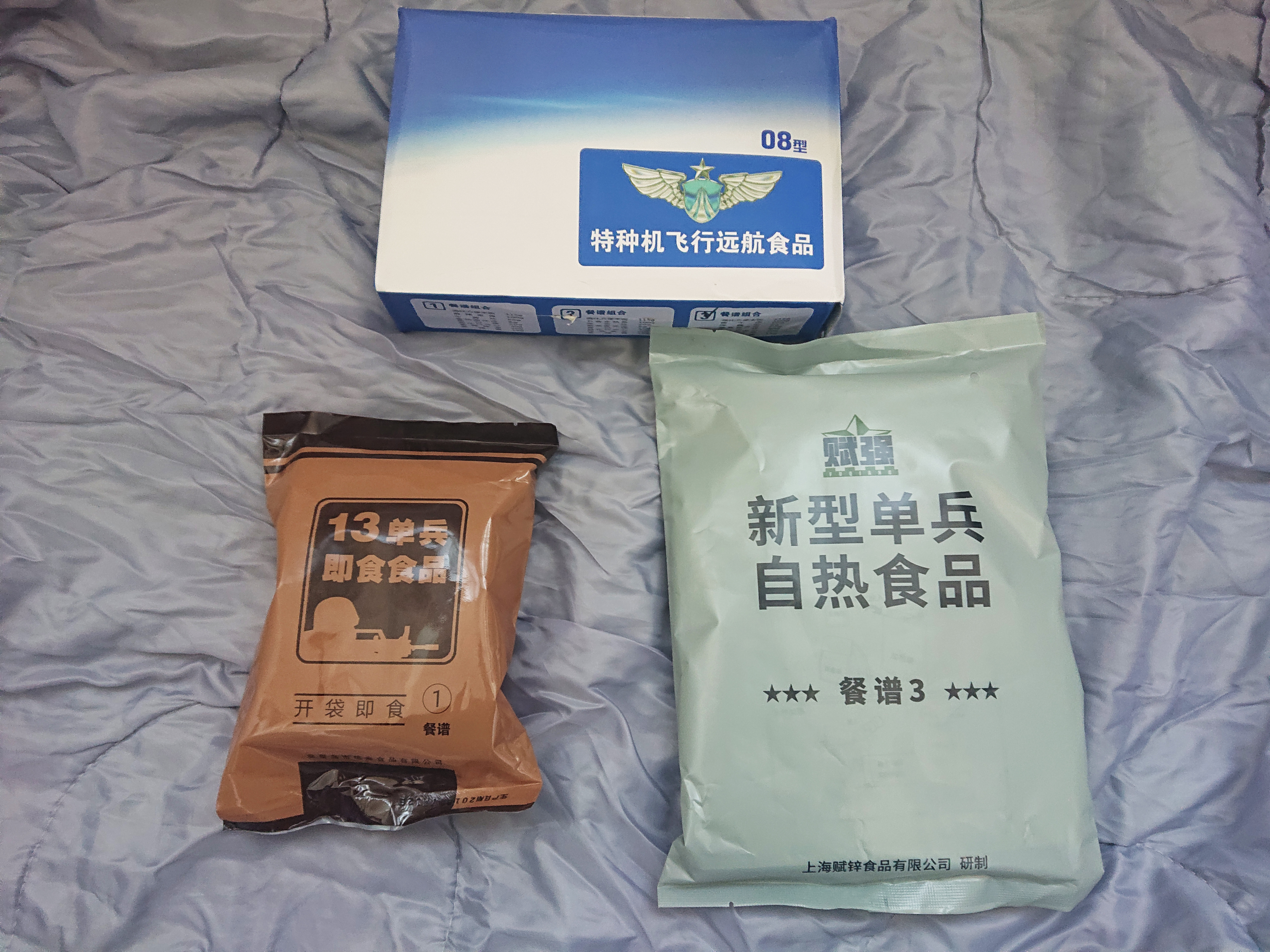
PLA rations. Clockwise from the top: PLAAF Long-Range Flight Ration, PLARF Self-Heating Ration, PLA Type 13 Instant Ration

The People's Liberation Army's rations are of two types: Instant Meal Individual (three-item menu) and Self-Heating Individual (twelve-item menu) (Type 13 and 09). Sets of rations issued since 2018 consist of pre-packaged single-person meals sealed in hard plastic retort pouches. A typical Chinese breakfast ration contains roughly 1,000 kcal (4,200 kJ) and includes a compressed food packet, an energy bar, an egg roll with pork, pickled mustard tuber, and a powdered beverage pack. Each Self-Heating Individual comes with an insulated flameless heater that is activated by water.

=== Philippines ===
The Armed Forces of the Philippines formerly had a combat ration similar to American MREs. Typically, they included a small can of sardines or tuna, instant noodles, crackers, instant coffee, a small packet of peanuts, ginger tea, and a biscuit or cookie. Chocolate manufactured for hot conditions are sometimes issued. Canned rice is also issued.

In 2016, "Ready-to-Eat" rations were announced to replace older rations. They are packed in green plastic retort pouches and considered fit to eat for Muslim service members (halal). For example, Menu #2 has four packs of cooked rice, one tuna rice with sisig, one pack of chicken sausage with sauce, one pack of chicken lechon paksiw, one pack of powdered milk, one pack of 3-in-1 coffee, one pack of plain crackers, a spork, and wet tissues.

=== Singapore ===
The Singapore Armed Forces issues three types of combat rations – Type M (Muslim), Type N (Non-Muslim), and Type V (Vegetarian). Each type comes in 4 or 5 different menus, packed in a heavy-duty green plastic bag similar to an American MRE bag, but measuring 205 mm x 190 mm x 115 mm (8" x 7.5" x 4.5") and weighing 1.5 kg (3.3 lb). Most items are retort-pouched (in the form of a watery paste and eaten straight from the pouch) and (except for the hot beverages) can be eaten without further preparation. The ration provides three meals and a variety of between-meal snacks, averaging 3,350 kcal (14,000 kJ) per day. Each ration bag includes 2 retort-pouched main courses, a dessert, and an accessory pack containing 2 fruit bars, 4 packages of cookies, an envelope of isotonic drink mix powder, an envelope of instant flavored tea mix, a hot beverage (coffee, cocoa, or tea), an envelope of cereal mix, candy, matches, fuel tablets, and tissue paper. A package of instant noodles is provided with every meal pack, but is issued separately. Typical Type M (Menu #1): Rendang Mutton with rice; Tandoori Chicken with rice; Red Bean dessert. Typical Type N (Menu #5): Pasta Bolognese; Yellow Rice with Chicken; Barley Dessert with milk. Typical Type V (Menu #1): Mock Chicken Curry with rice; Vegetarian Fried Noodle; Green Bean dessert with coconut milk.

=== Sri Lanka ===
The primary operational ration of the Sri Lanka Armed Forces is the Jungle Ration, a 24-hour ration pack whose components are produced and assembled in Sri Lanka. It is issued to soldiers at the rate of one per soldier per day, and contains both food and sun-dry items designed to sustain troops where food storage and preparation facilities are not practical. All meals are precooked, requiring neither cooking nor preparation, and all items are packaged inside sealed plastic packages or lightweight aluminium cans. Precooked rice is included as part of every meal. Typical contents are: chicken curry with potatoes, vegetable curry, precooked rice, hard crackers, processed cheese, soup cubes, instant milk powder, orange drink powder, and dates or dried pineapple. A sundry pack containing tea bags, sugar, salt, glucose tablets, seasonings, matches, plastic bags, and toilet paper is included with every ration pack.

=== South Korea ===
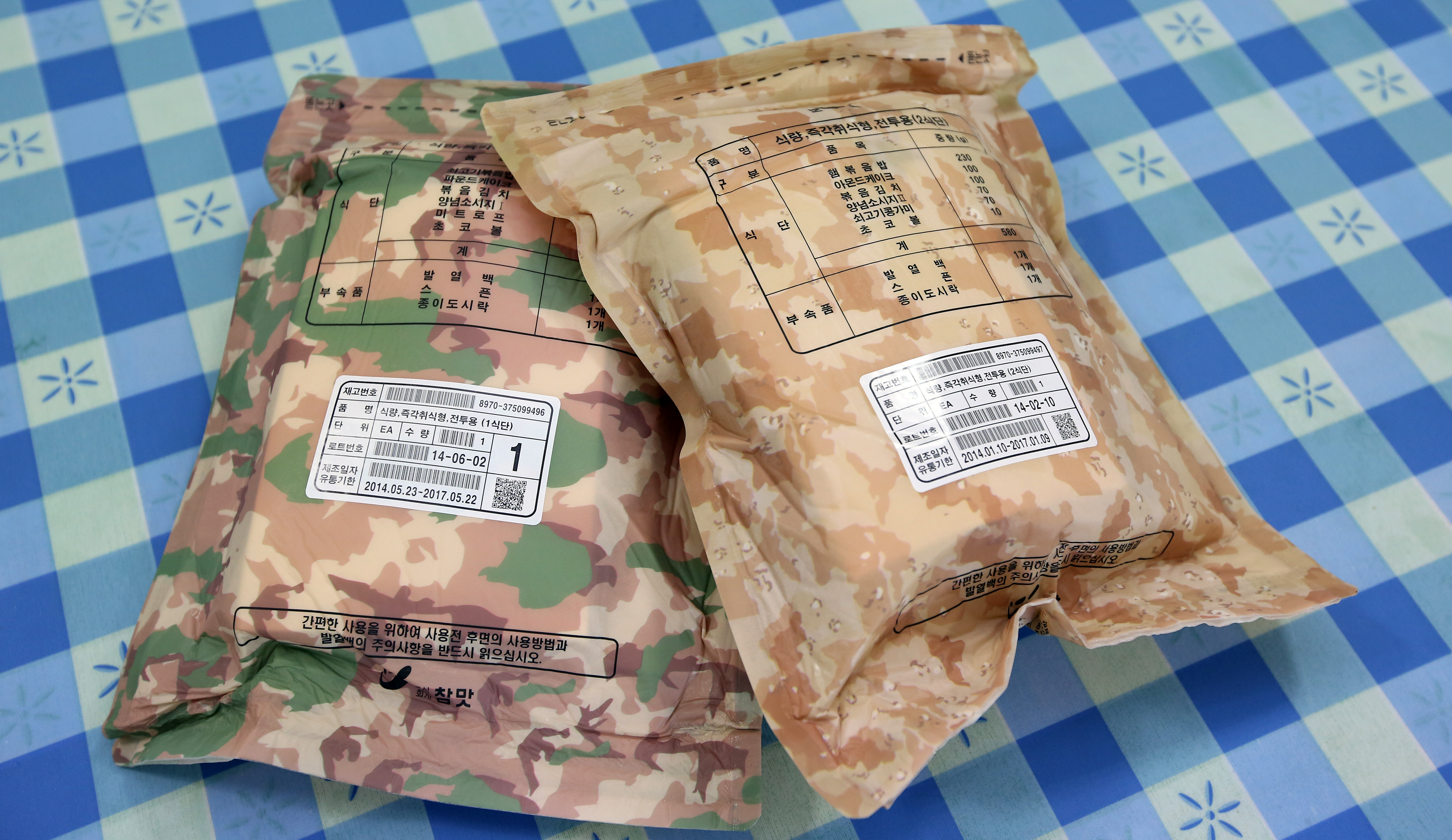
South Korean combat rations (Type I and Type II)

The Republic of Korea Armed Forces issues two types of field rations, Type I and Type II. Type I ration has ready-to-eat foods packed in foil-plastic trilaminate pouches, placed in turn inside a thin cardboard box. Typical contents include: 1 pouch (250 g) precooked white rice with meat and vegetables, plus a separate seasoning packet; 1 pouch (250 g) precooked rice with red beans; 1 packet (100 g) of 6 pork sausages in BBQ; 1 packet (100 g) kimchi; and 1 packet (50 g) cooked black beans. The Type II ration is a smaller, lighter, freeze-dried single-meal ration consisting of several small pouches packed inside a larger gray plastic pouch measuring 225 mm x 200 mm x 90 mm and weighing 278 g. Typical contents include: freeze dried rice (various flavors, usually with meat and vegetables included), a pouch of instant soup, flavored sesame oil, seasoning and spice packets, dried chives and chocolate.

=== Taiwan ===
The Republic of China Armed Forces issues two types of field rations. One of them is called "field combat ration pack" (Chinese: 野戰口糧), which contains crackers, bakkwa, dry mango, nuts, chocolate paste, candy and energy drink. The other one is "field combat retort pouch" (Chinese: 野戰加熱式餐盒), which has 13 types of flavor in total.

=== Vietnam ===
Field rations issued by the People's Army of Vietnam include the Army Field Ration BB107, the Paratrooper Dry Provision (for pilots), and the Chinese 3 star field ration that is contained in an iron box, easy to carry.

The word "field ration" in Vietnamese called "lương khô" (Han-Nom: 糧枯). The Ministry of Defense also develops rations for the Special Operations Force and the Border Patrol Force. The new rations are used in three main courses - breakfast, lunch and dinner. They mostly contain Vietnamese braised pork, meat stews, sticky rice, white rice, dried vegetables that can be heated with water, nutrition drinks, fruit juices, nutrition snacks, eateries (spoon, fork and straw), napkins, and toothpicks.

In the Vietnam War, Viet Cong troops often brought dried cooked vegetables, bags of pork floss, contained nutrition tabs, and ginger candy as their ration food.

== United Nations ==
During peacekeeping operations in Lebanon, United Nations peacekeepers were reported to make use of a ration packaged similar to that of the American MRE designated the Individual Food Ration (French: Ration Alimentaire Individuelle). These rations are meant to be consumed over a period of 24 hours, and are notoriously difficult to acquire by civilians. There are 12 available menus in the form of 3 "Western" (Pasta with Beef and Chickpea Stew, Vegetables with Beef and Tomato and Cheese Pasta, Chilli Con Carne, Baked Beans), 3 Halal, 3 Kosher, and 3 Vegetarian. Each ration also comes with both sweet and salty biscuits and an accessory pack containing fruit muesli, fruit jelly, fruit jam, dark chocolate, cheese spread, chewing gum, eight pouches of sugar, salt, pepper, ketchup and Mexican sauce. Another accessory pack with instant coffee, tea, an instant fruit drink and a hyperprotein drink is also included.

== See also ==
- Field ration
- Garrison ration
- Mess
- Military nutrition
- Military rations
