= Torta =

Broad name for many breads

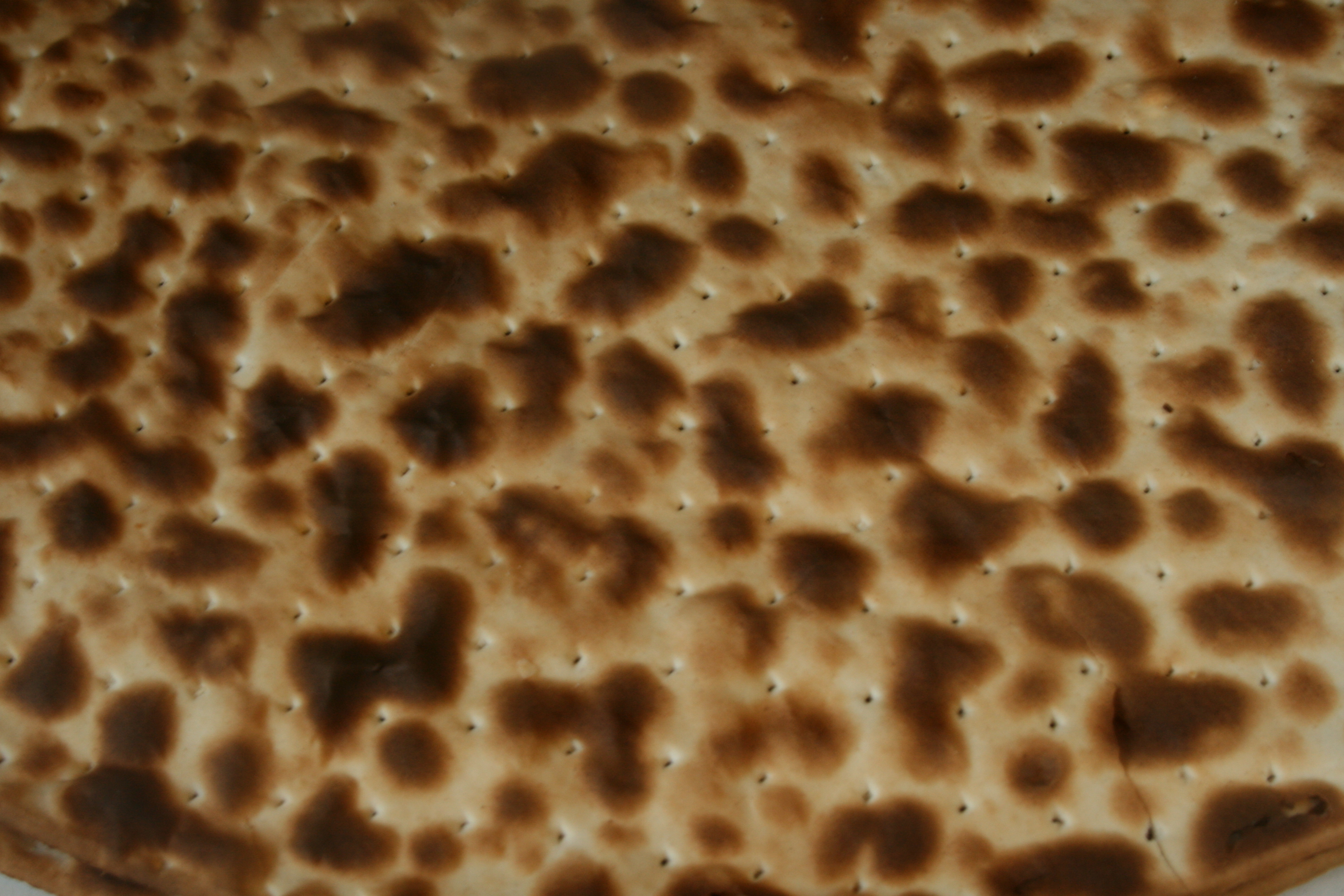
- Type: Flatbread, cake, sandwich, or omelette
- Place of origin: Spain; Mexico; Italy; Philippines; Malta; Slovakia; Serbia; Bosnia; Croatia; Sweden; Albania

Torta is a culinary term that can, depending on the cuisine, refer to cakes, pies, flatbreads, sandwiches, or omelettes.

Usually, it refers to:

- a cake or pie in most of Europe, most of Latin America, and southern Philippines;
- a flatbread in Spain;
- a type of sandwich in Mexico;
- a type of omelette in northern Tagalog-speaking areas of the Philippines.

== Etymology ==
The word comes from Late Latin torta, an abbreviation of torta panis ("twisted bread"). Other related terms are English tart and Welsh torth ("loaf").

In US English, it is generally understood to be a loanword of Spanish torta (Spanish: [ˈtoɾta]).

== Cakes ==
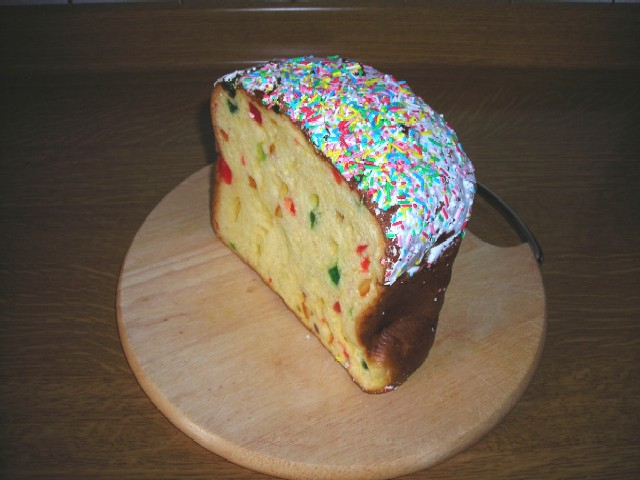
Torta dolce (sweet cake), from Perugia, Umbria, Italy

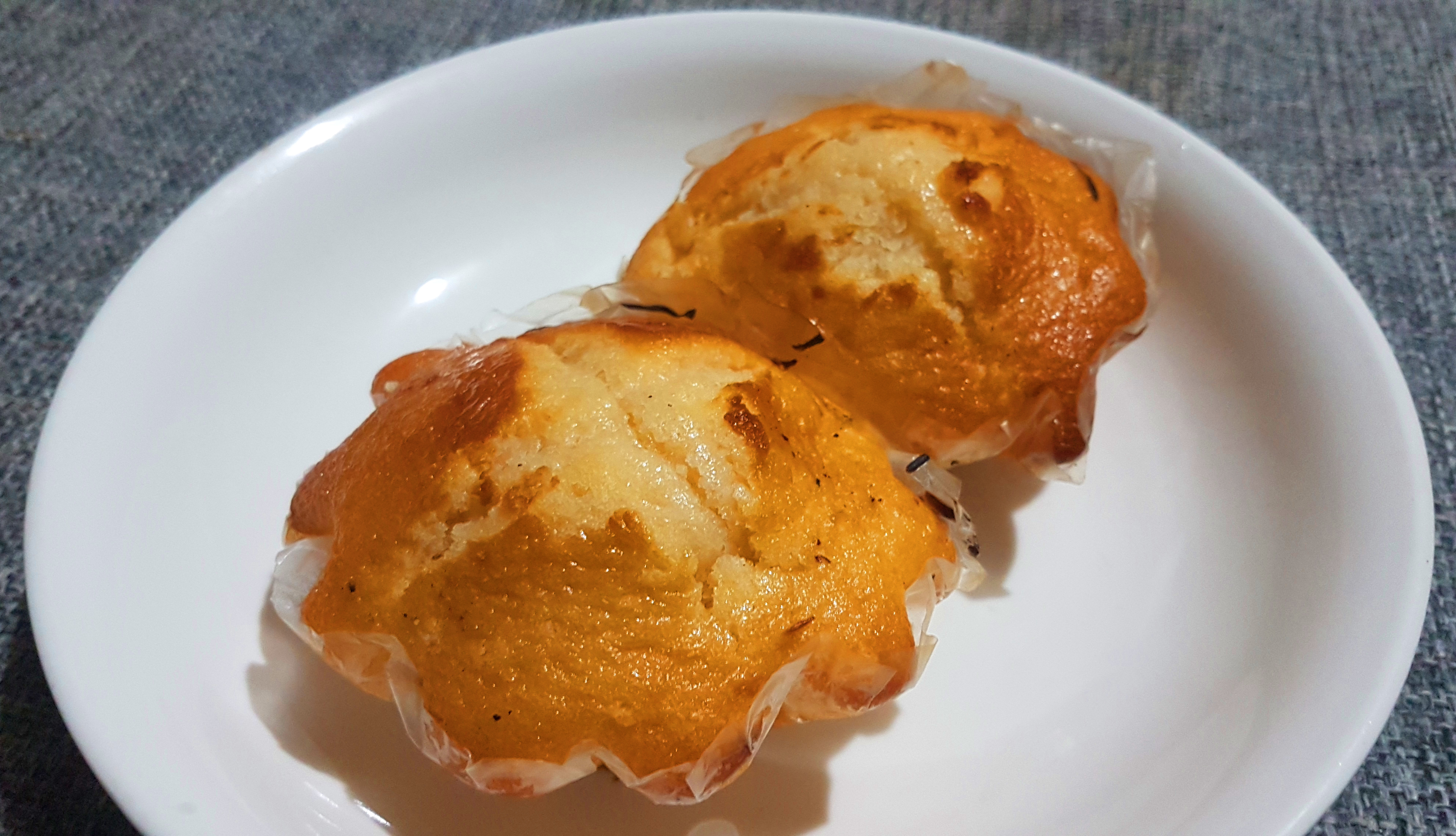
Visayan torta mamón from the Philippines

=== Latin America and Spain ===
In some countries of Latin America, the word torta, in a very common usage, is for sweet cakes (tortes), such as a wedding or birthday cake. This meaning is also present in other European languages. For example, the Italian torta, German Torte or French tarte. In Mexico, "torta" refers to a sandwich and the sweet cake is normally referred to as pastel, which is also used in other parts of Latin America with this meaning. Huevo en torta (not to be confused with torta de huevo) is a typical pastry from Sobrarbe, Aragon, Spain.

=== Philippines ===
In the southern Philippines, in the Visayas and Mindanao islands, torta is generally used to refer to small cakes. It usually refers to mamón or torta mamón, a native porous sponge cake delicacy (traditionally made with lard and palm wine) that resembles a large cupcake with butter, sugar, and/or cheese on top, traditionally served with sikwate (a thick, hot drink made of ground roasted cacao seeds) for afternoon snack or merienda.

=== Europe ===
In Hungarian, Polish, Slovak, Slovene, Bosnian, Croatian, Serbian, Swedish, Italian, Macedonian and Bulgarian, it is a word for cake, typically made with layered sponge and cream, chocolate or fruit filling. In Portugal, it designates specifically a Swiss roll.

=== Middle East and North Africa ===
Sweet tarts in Arabic are called تورتَه (transliterated: twrtah)

== Flatbreads ==
=== Spain ===
Torta in Spain originated in different regional variants of flatbread, of which the torta de gazpacho and torta cenceña still survives in certain areas of Central Spain. Tortas are also mentioned in Leviticus 24:5-9, in the Spanish translation of the Bible. Presently, however, the word torta is also applied to different kinds of bread and pastry products according to the region.

Historically, the difference between torta and bread was its round and flat shape, as well as the use of baking soda/powder as the proofing agent instead of yeast. In most regions, a torta was traditionally considered an inferior form of bread, as the well known Spanish aphorism expresses:

A falta de pan buenas son tortas.	Where there is no bread tortas will do.

=== Latin America ===
In Mexico, a variation says: A falta de pan, tortillas ("Where there is no bread, tortillas"). However, the term "torta" in Mexico typically refers to a sandwich made with bread (see Mexico section, below, for more details).

Torta frita is a fried flatbread eaten in Uruguay, Argentina and the Chilean Patagonia.

== Omelettes ==
=== Philippines ===
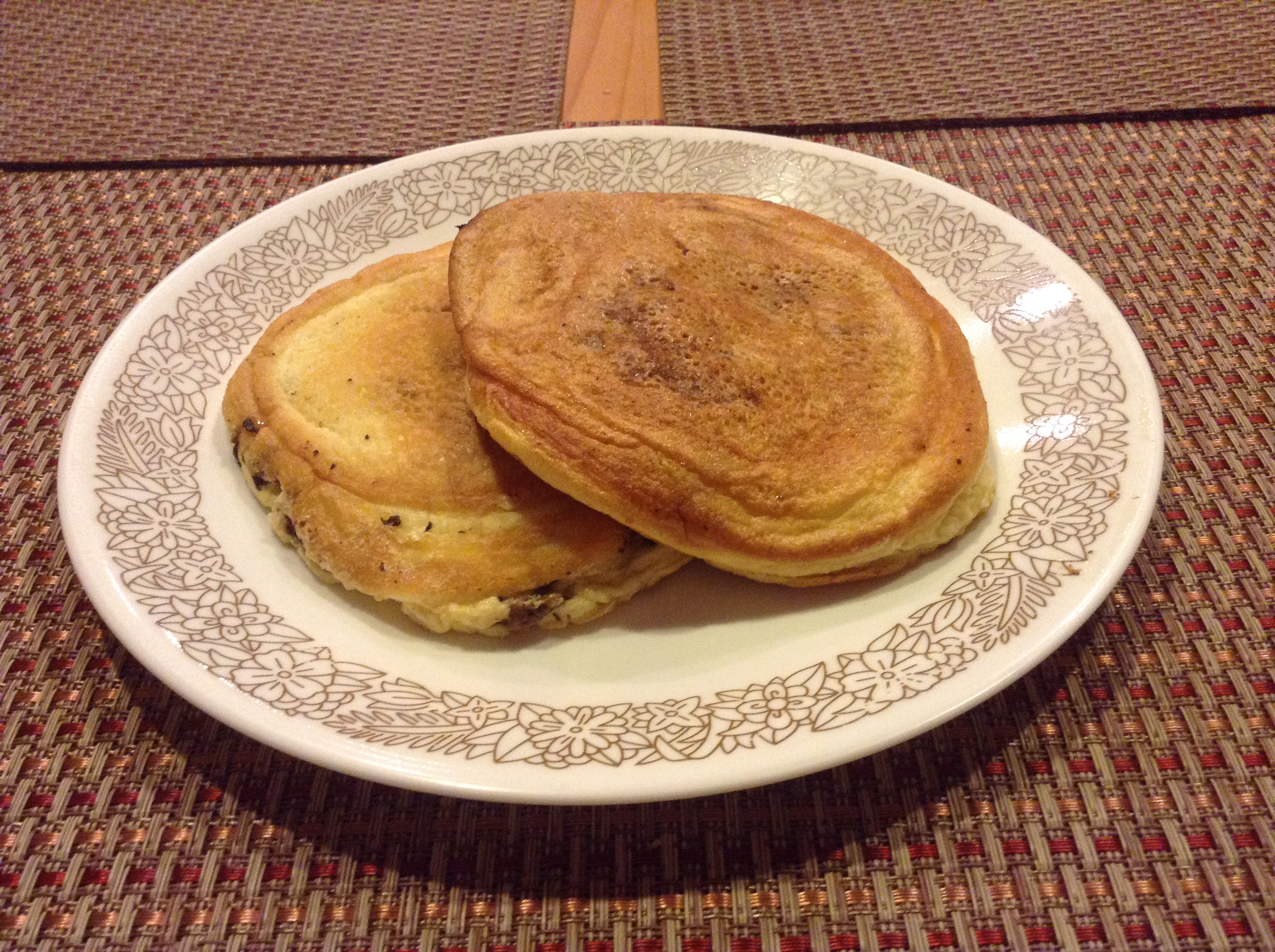
Tortang gulay, a Philippine vegetable omelette

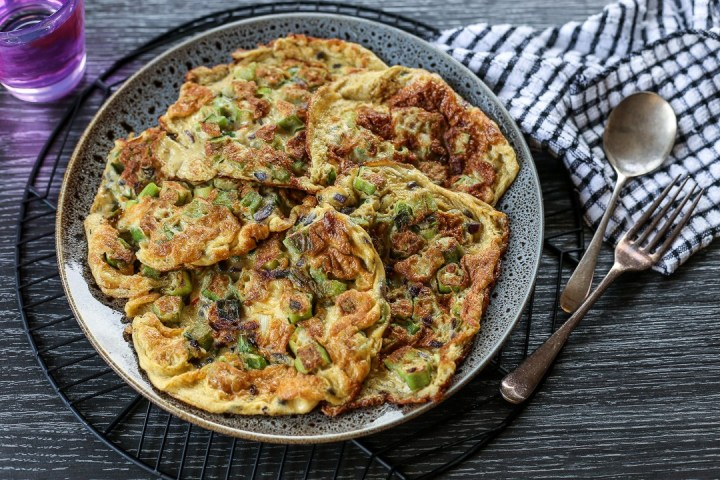
Tortang Okra, a Filipino omelette dish prepared with eggs, okra, onions and seasonings

In the northern Philippines, particularly among Tagalog-speaking provinces and islands, torta refers to a class of omelettes made by mixing eggs with various ingredients.

Tortas can be served any time during the day. There are many variations on Filipino tortas, such as:

- Tortang alamang or tortang hipon – an omelette with krill or small shrimp. Also known as shrimp fritters, although this term usually refers to okoy, a fritter made with shrimp and various vegetables (as well as other variations without shrimp).
- Tortang carne norte - an omelette made with corned beef.
- Tortang giniling or tortang picadillo – an omelette with ground meat (usually beef or pork) and sautéed vegetables.
- Tortang gulay – an omelette with peppers, mushrooms, onion, and garlic.
- Tortang kalabasa – an omelette made with finely julienned calabaza, eggs, flour, and salt.
- Tortang kamote – an omelette made with mashed sweet potato, eggs, flour, and salt.
- Tortang sardinas - an omelette made with sardines and tomato sauce.
- Tortang talong – an eggplant fritter.
- Tortang okra – an omelette with thinly sliced okra, onion, and garlic.

=== Spain and Latin America ===
Tortilla de huevo is a small fried mixture of scrambled eggs, usually eaten sandwiched in bread.

== Pies ==
=== Italy ===
In Italian, "torta" means either cake or pie, however sweet or savoury.

The Italian torta is differentiated from crostata by the filling: a crostata has an inconsistent chunky filling, whereas a torta has a consistent filling made of blended ingredients.

Some wrongly believe that an Italian crust torta is a combination of layered cheeses and tomatoes to be spread onto bread. Italian torta is a pie similar to quiche and served as a brunch item. However, torta is different than quiche as the filling is mostly made of cheese, not egg. The crust can also be made from pizza dough. Ingredients vary as there are many variations of this torta. Traditional Italian torta usually includes ricotta, parmesan, parsley, and onion. There are also variations that contain meat and some that are completely vegetarian. These vegetarian torte sometimes contain artichokes and spices for flavor. This torta is made in a springform pan instead of a traditional pie pan.

=== Brazil ===
Torta in Portugal, Brazil and other Portuguese speaking countries refers to a moist cake or a pie which can be a sweet or savory dish.

=== Malta ===
Torta in Malta means a pie, which can be sweet or savoury.

Most "tortas" are generally savoury, with a classic Maltese dish being "torta tal-lampuki" (lampuki, singular lampuka, are a type of common fish found in Maltese waters).

A common example of a sweet Maltese torta is "torta tal-lewz" (lewz, singular lewza, means almonds in Maltese. Almonds are a very common ingredient in Maltese cuisine, although some people prefer to use marzipan over almonds, either because of ease, taste preference or cost.

=== South America ===
In Venezuela, Ecuador, Chile, and Uruguay, people typically refer to dessert cakes as "tortas."

== Sandwiches ==
=== Mexico ===
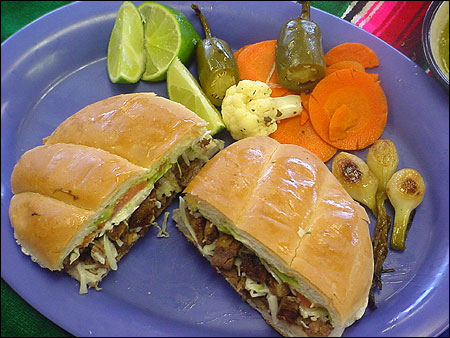
Mexican-style torta (made with telera) with typical accompaniments

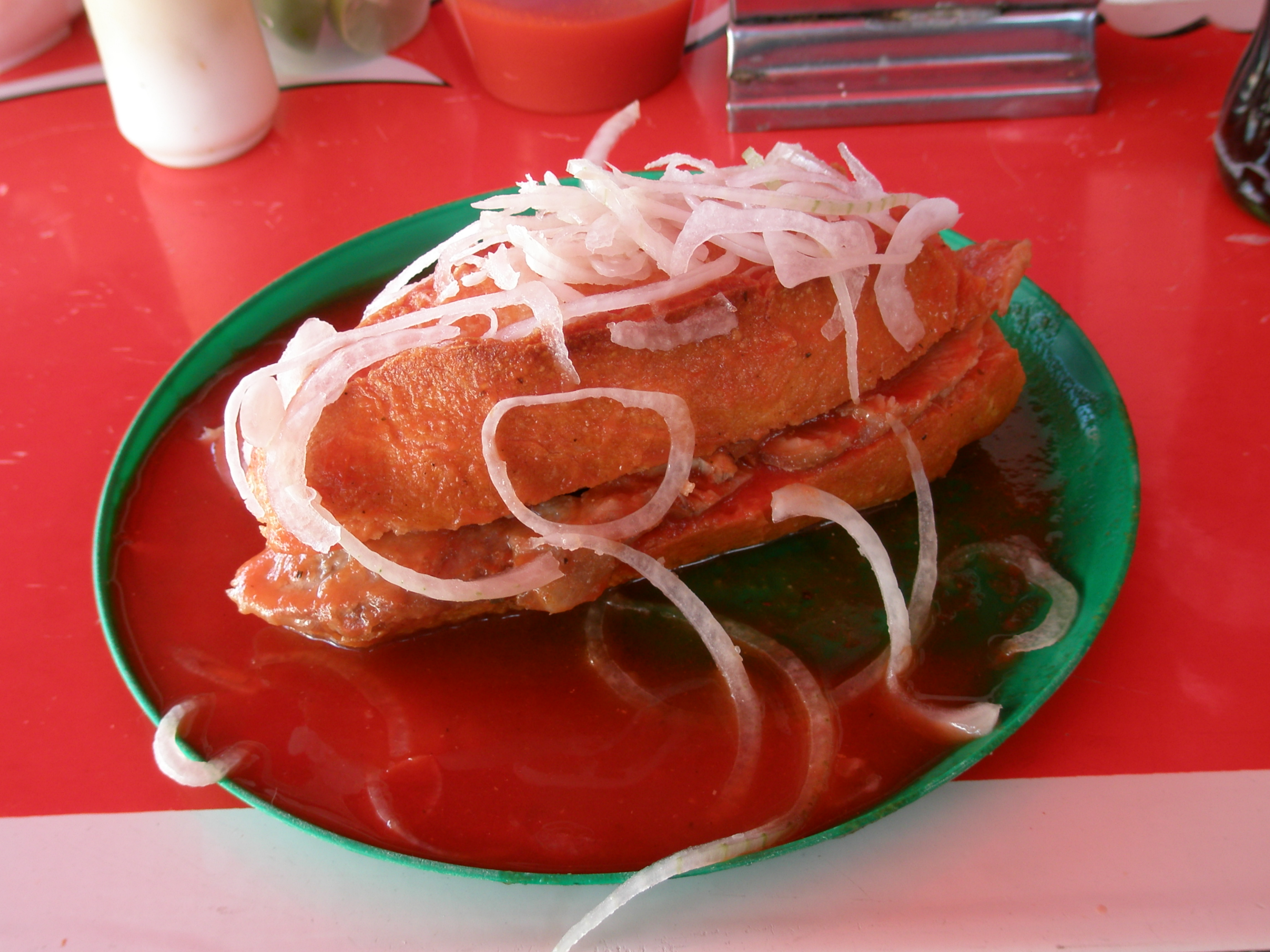
Mexican torta ahogada, a pork sandwich with chili/tomato sauce, onion slices and lime juice

In Mexico, a torta is a kind of sandwich, served on one of two types of white sandwich rolls. The first is similar to a small baguette, and may be referred to as a bolillo, birote, or pan francés depending on region. The second is a flat, oblong, soft roll also called a sandwich roll, also referred as a telera. Tortas can be eaten cold or hot, and grilled or toasted in a press in the same manner as a Cuban sandwich.

Garnishes, such as avocado, chili pepper (usually poblano, chipotle or jalapeño), tomato, and onion, are common. The dish is popular throughout Mexico, and is also available anywhere with a large Mexican population. In Northern Mexico, the torta is very frequently called lonche by influence of the English "lunch", as it may be eaten during lunch break.

The sandwich is normally named according to its main ingredient:

- Torta de jamón, ham-filled torta
- Torta de aguacate, avocado-filled torta
- Torta de adobada, adobo meat-filled torta
- Torta de huevo, scrambled eggs-filled torta
- Torta de milanesa, torta filled with a milanesa (breaded fried cutlet)
- Tortope, chicken sope-filled torta

A few tortas have names whose connections to their fillings is less clear. The torta ahogada (meaning "drowned" torta) of Guadalajara is smothered in a red sauce. Different fillings are available and they may be mixed to create an original torta. Meanwhile, the torta cubana ("Cuban torta") is stuffed with a variety of meats, the identity of which varies across Mexico. This torta is unrelated to the Cuban sandwich served in Florida and Cuba and is not believed to have any connection to Cuban cuisine at all; instead, it seems to have been named for the place of its invention, Calle Republica de Cuba (Republic of Cuba Street) in Mexico City.

Due to the practicality of being hand-carried, tortas are sold at massive events, such as football matches, parades, and outdoor concerts, but they are also available for breakfast, lunch, or dinner at dedicated establishments or sold as street food by food carts.

The origin of the torta is unclear, but some claim it sprouted in Puebla due to Spanish-French interaction; others argue it was a late-arriving example of American influence. Teleras (the bread usually used in tortas) were inspired by French baguettes.

== Gallery ==
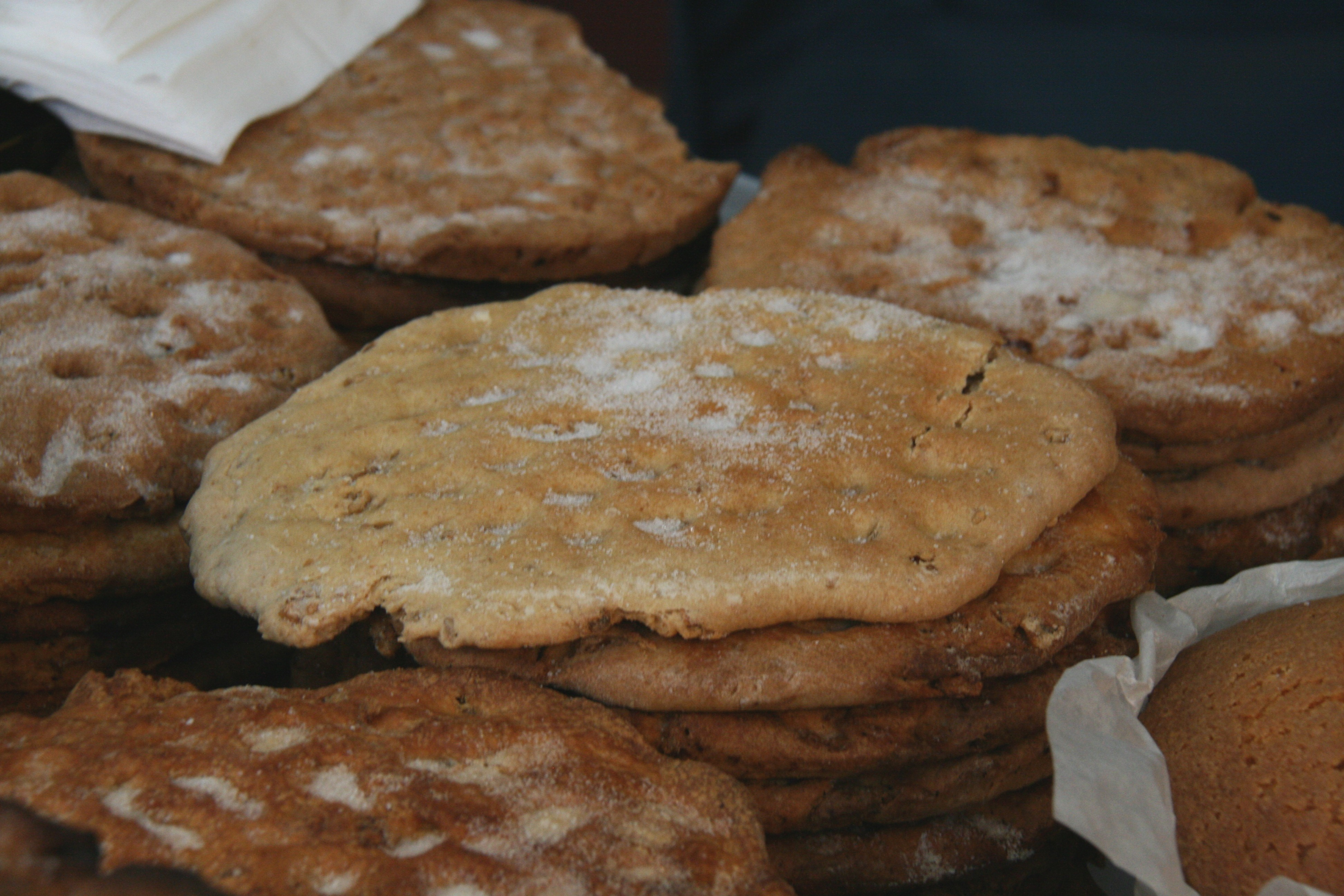
Torta de chicharrones from Galicia, Spain

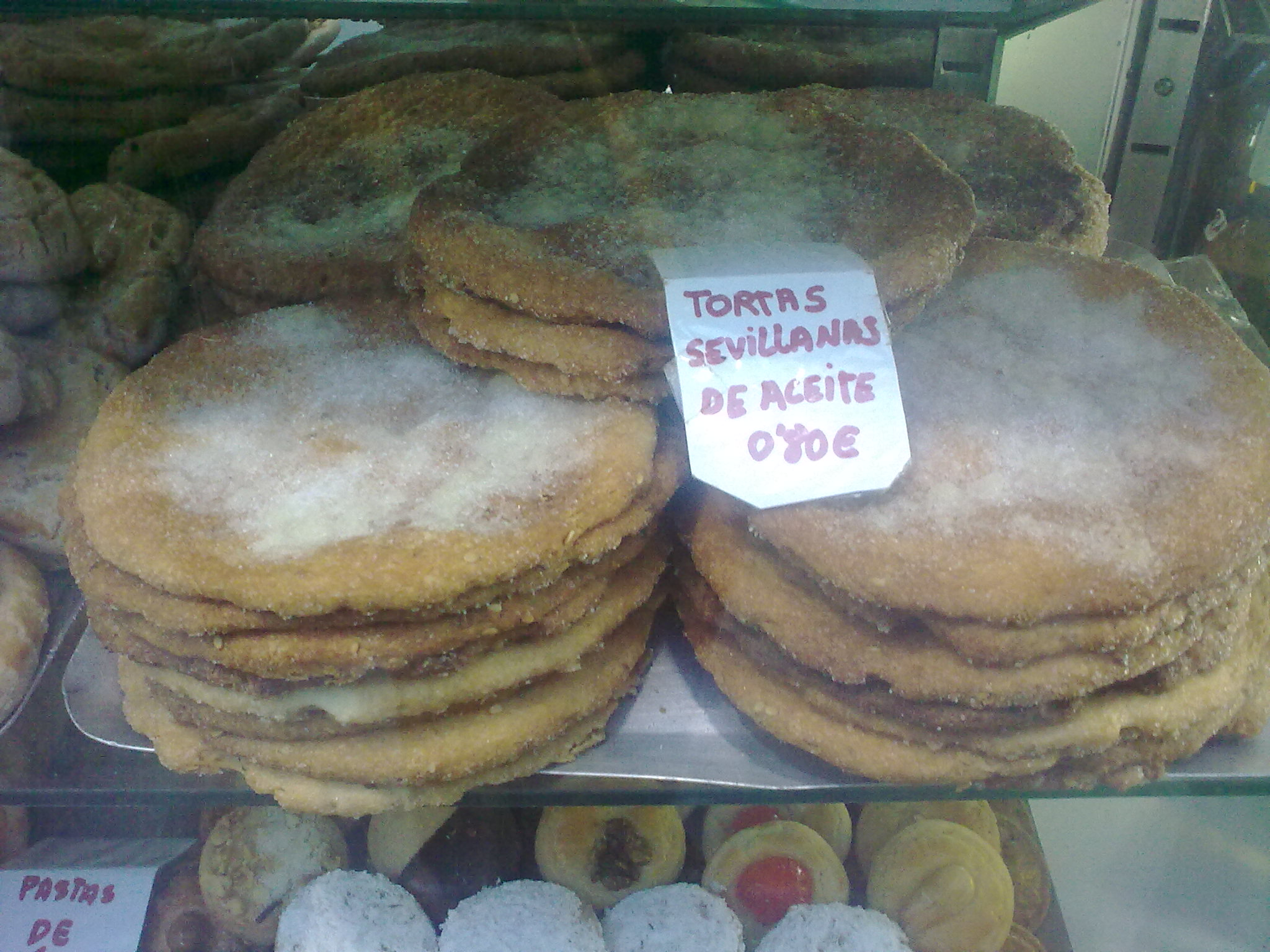
Tortas de aceite in Seville, Andalusia, Spain

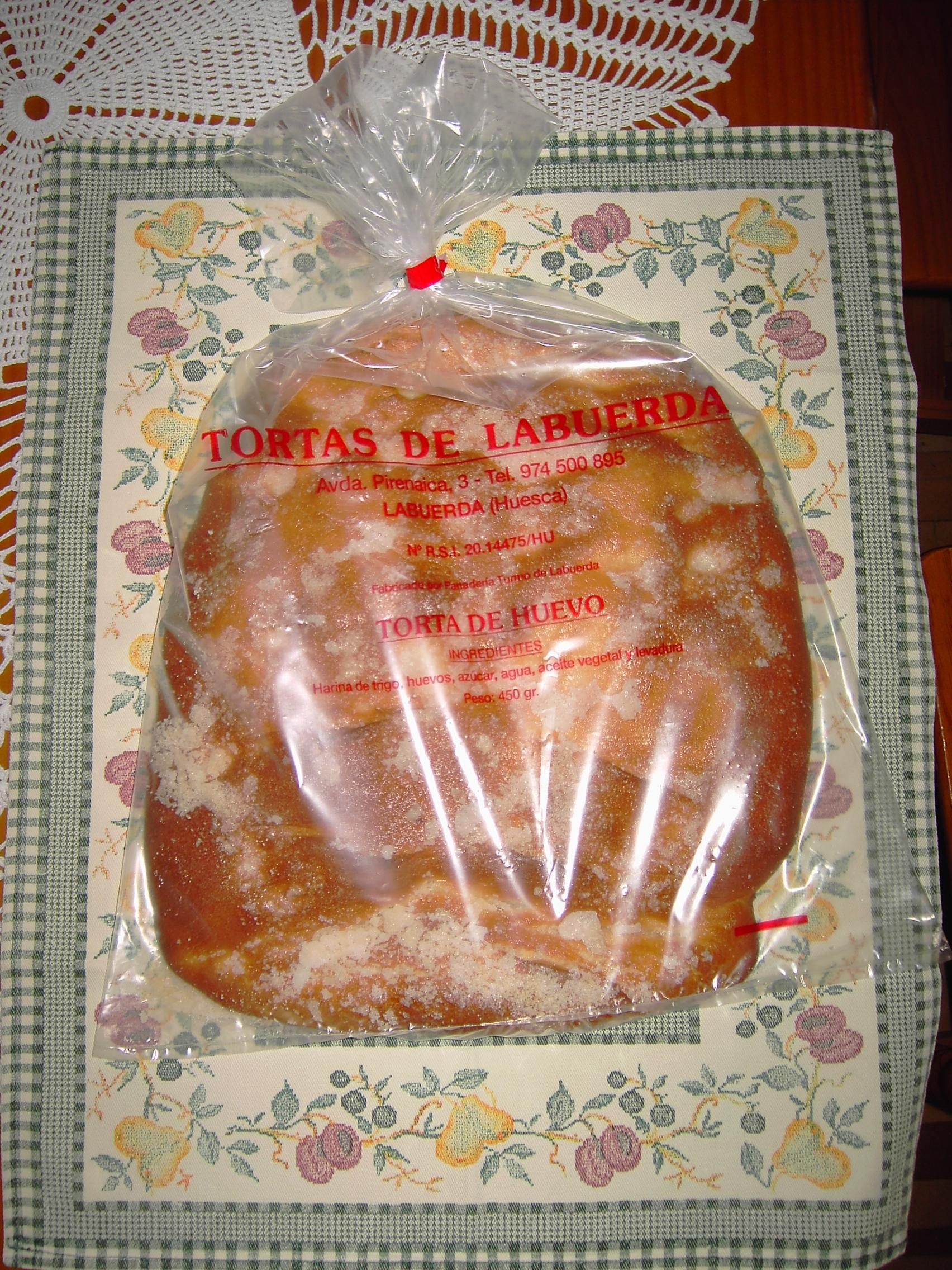
Packed torta de huevo, from Sobrarbe, Aragon, Spain

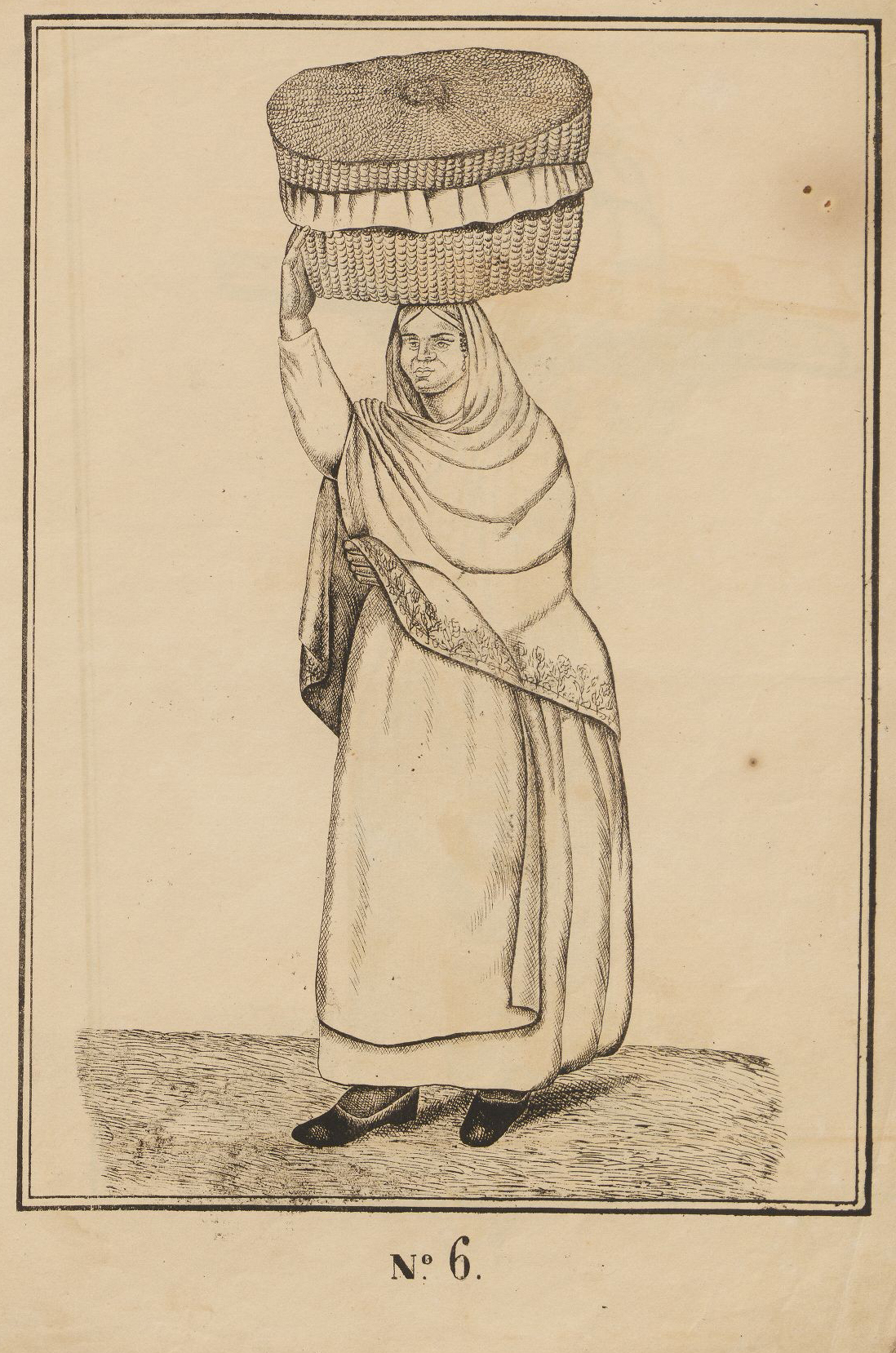
An 1839 drawing of a woman selling tortas

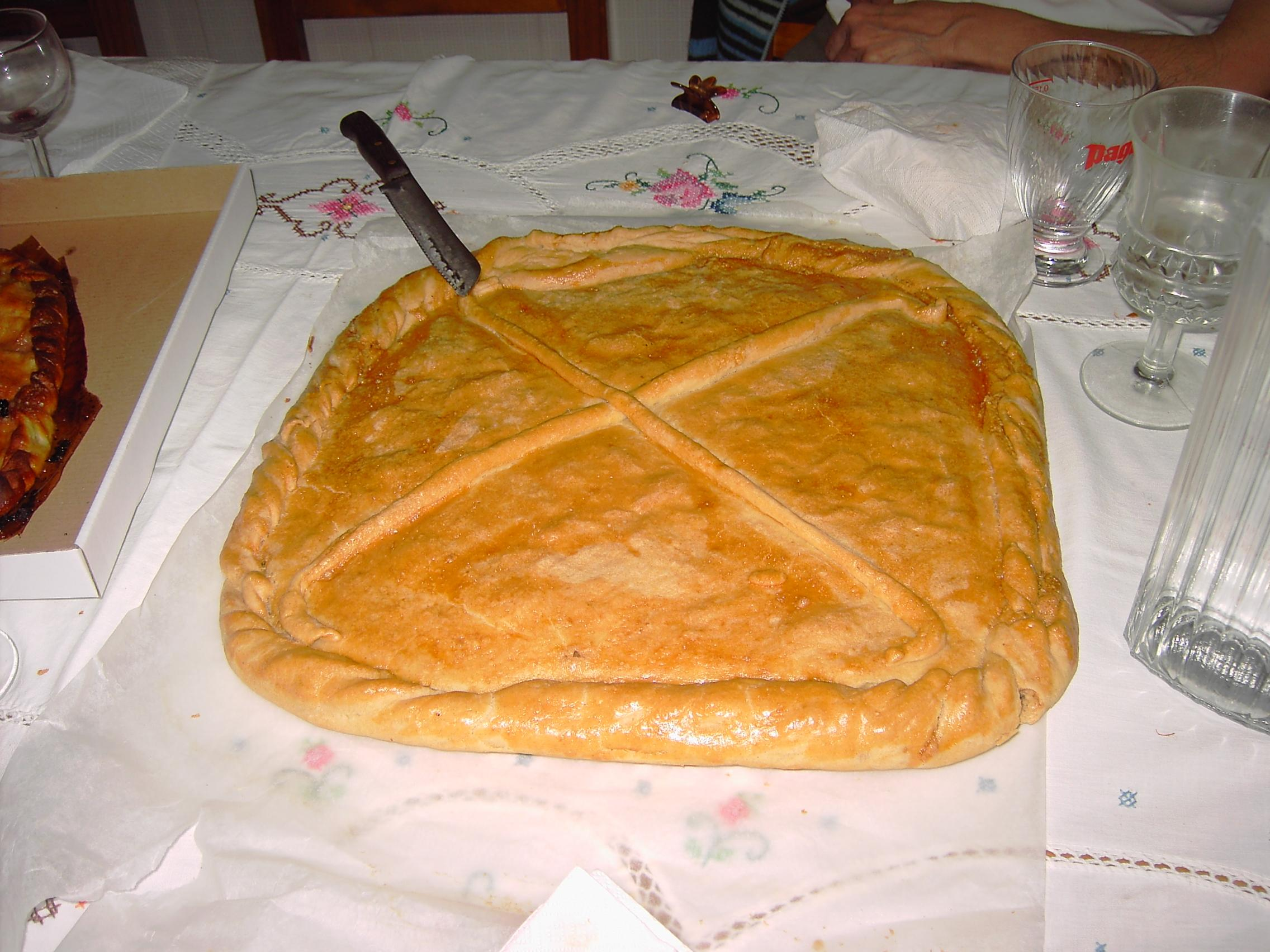
Torta from Ribagorza, Aragon, Spain

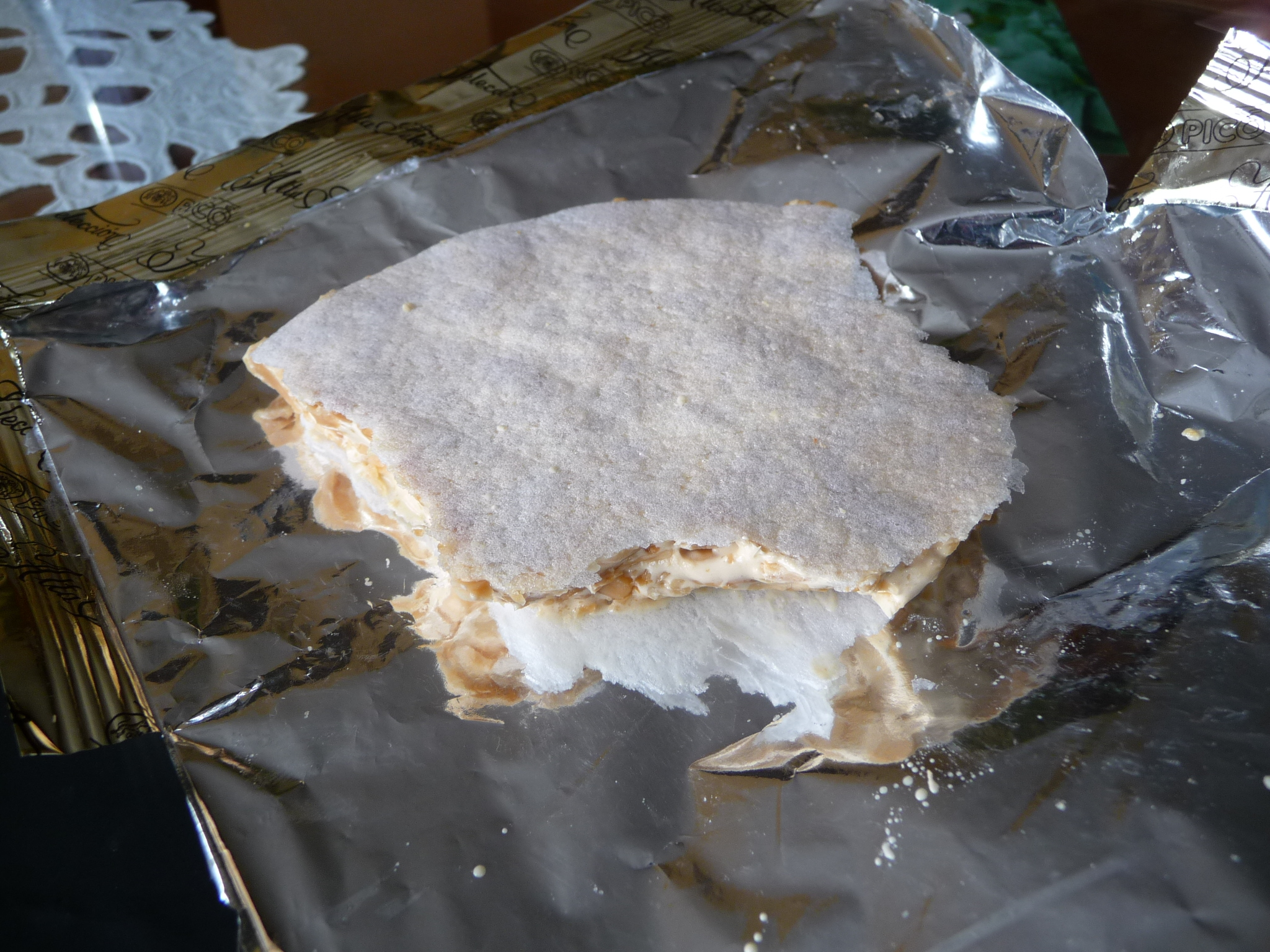
Torta imperial, Spain

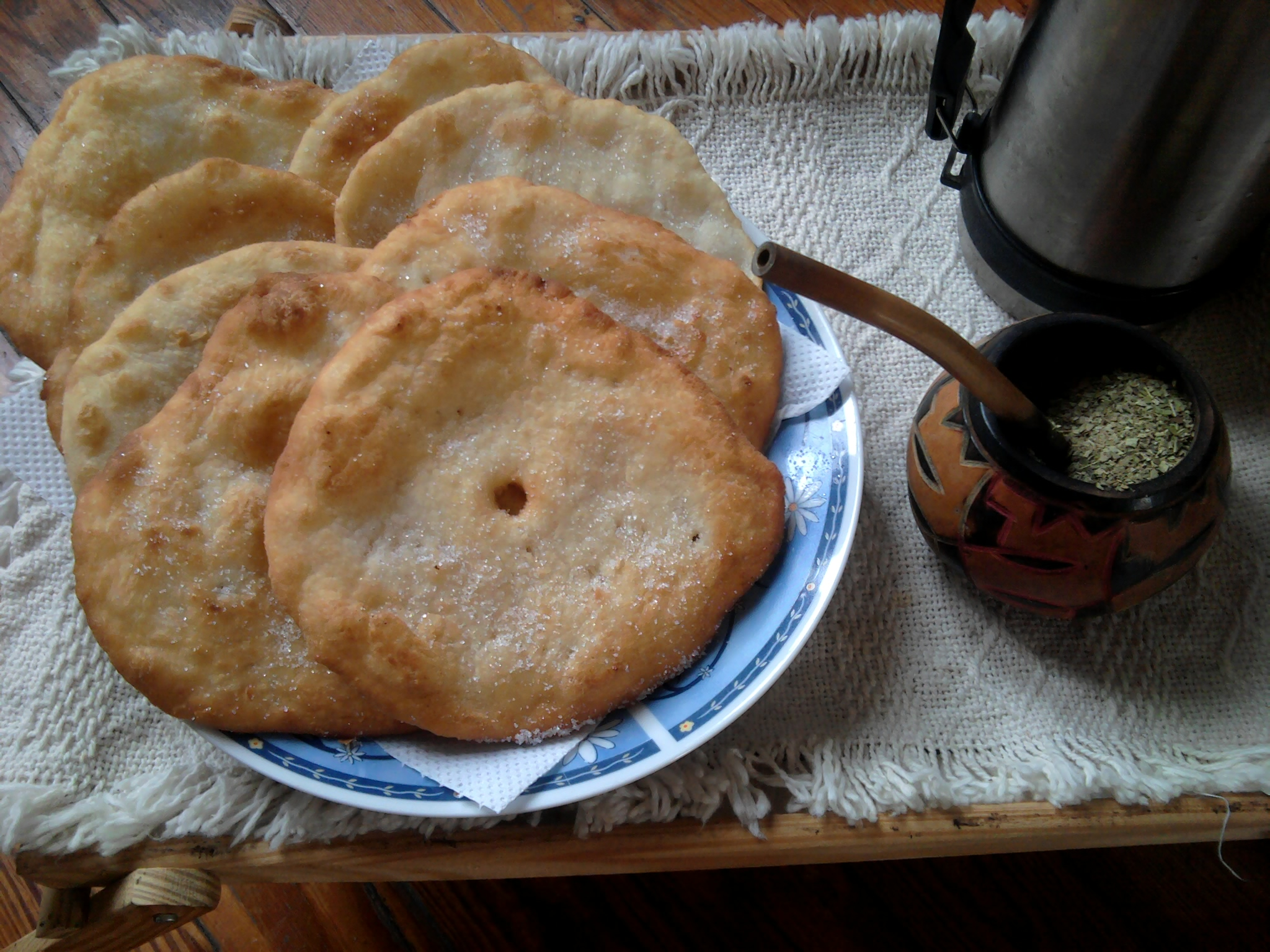
Torta frita from Uruguay and Argentina

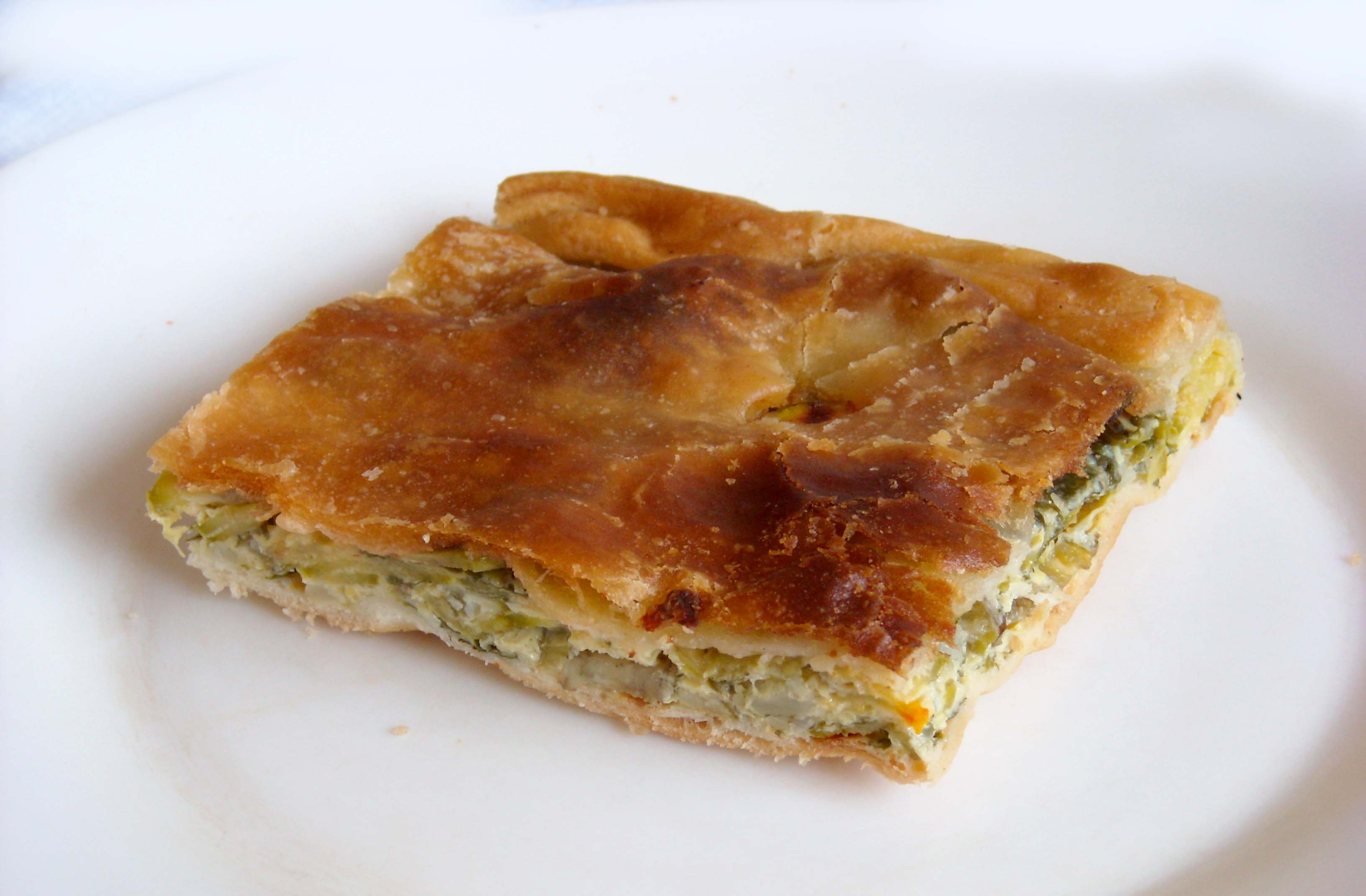
Torta verde from Ventimiglia, Italy

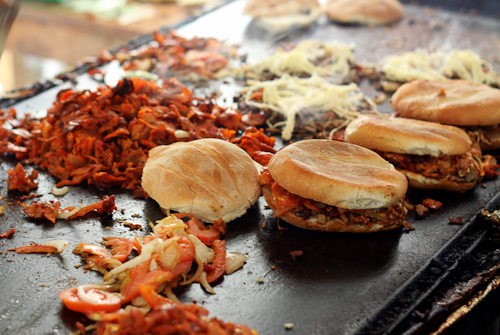
Tortas being prepared on a griddle in Oaxaca, Mexico

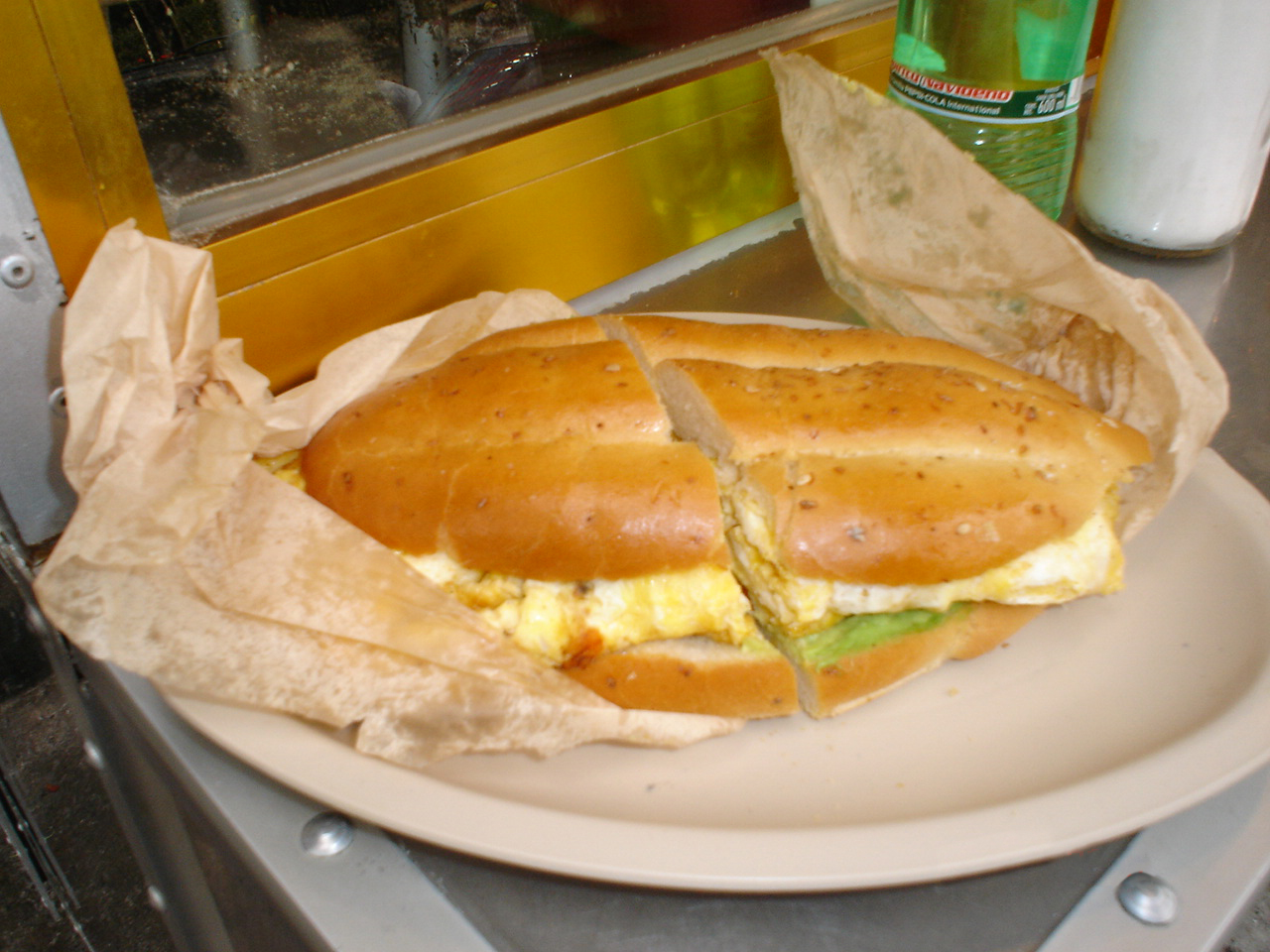
Mexican torta de huevo

== See also ==
- Arepa
- Tortilla
- Mozzarella
- Migas
- Pupusa
- Sopaipilla
- Torta de gazpacho
- Torta del Casar, a cheese made from sheep's milk in Extremadura, Spain.
- Torte
- List of sandwiches
