= Tortang talong =

Filipino eggplant fritter

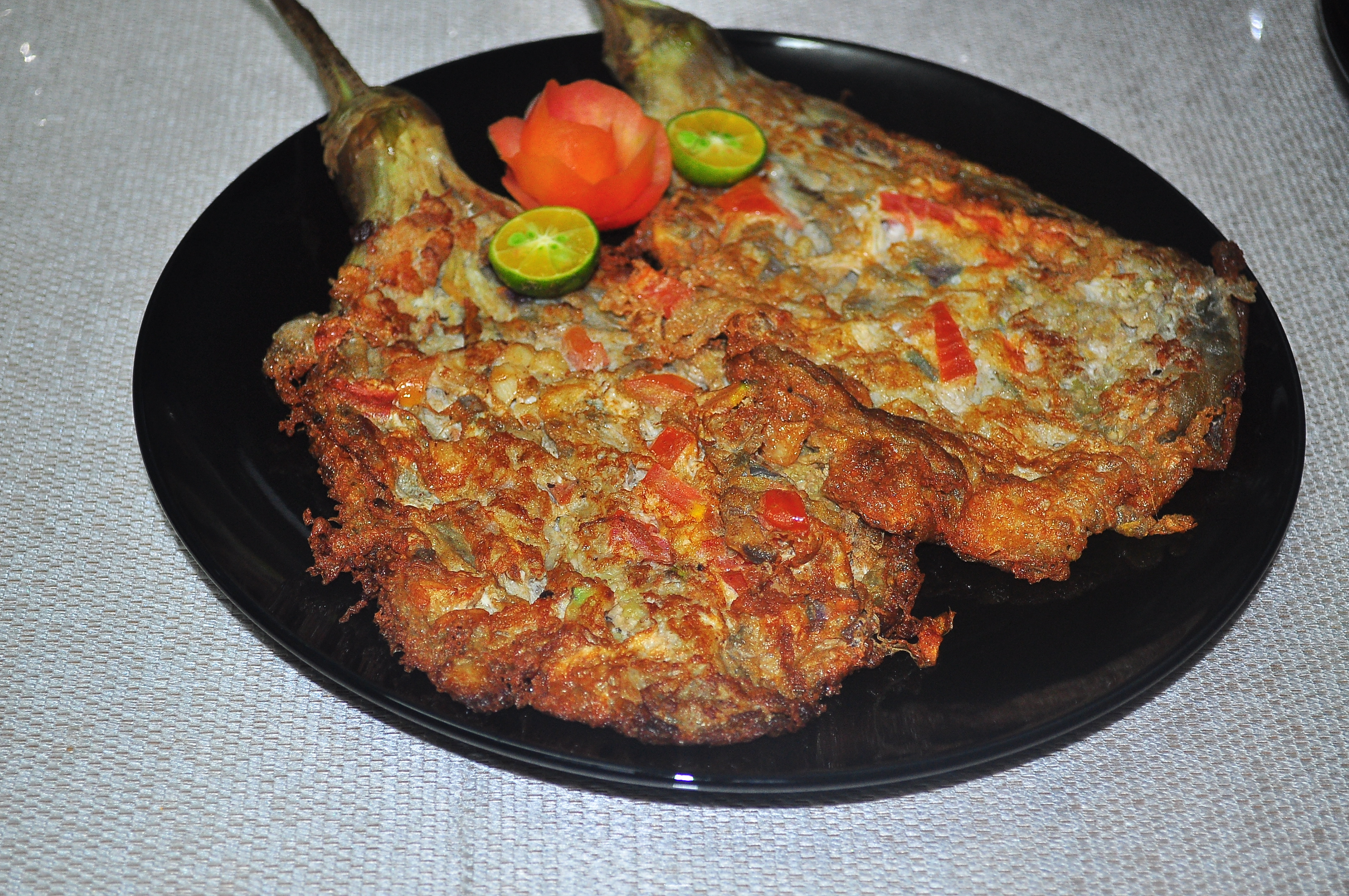
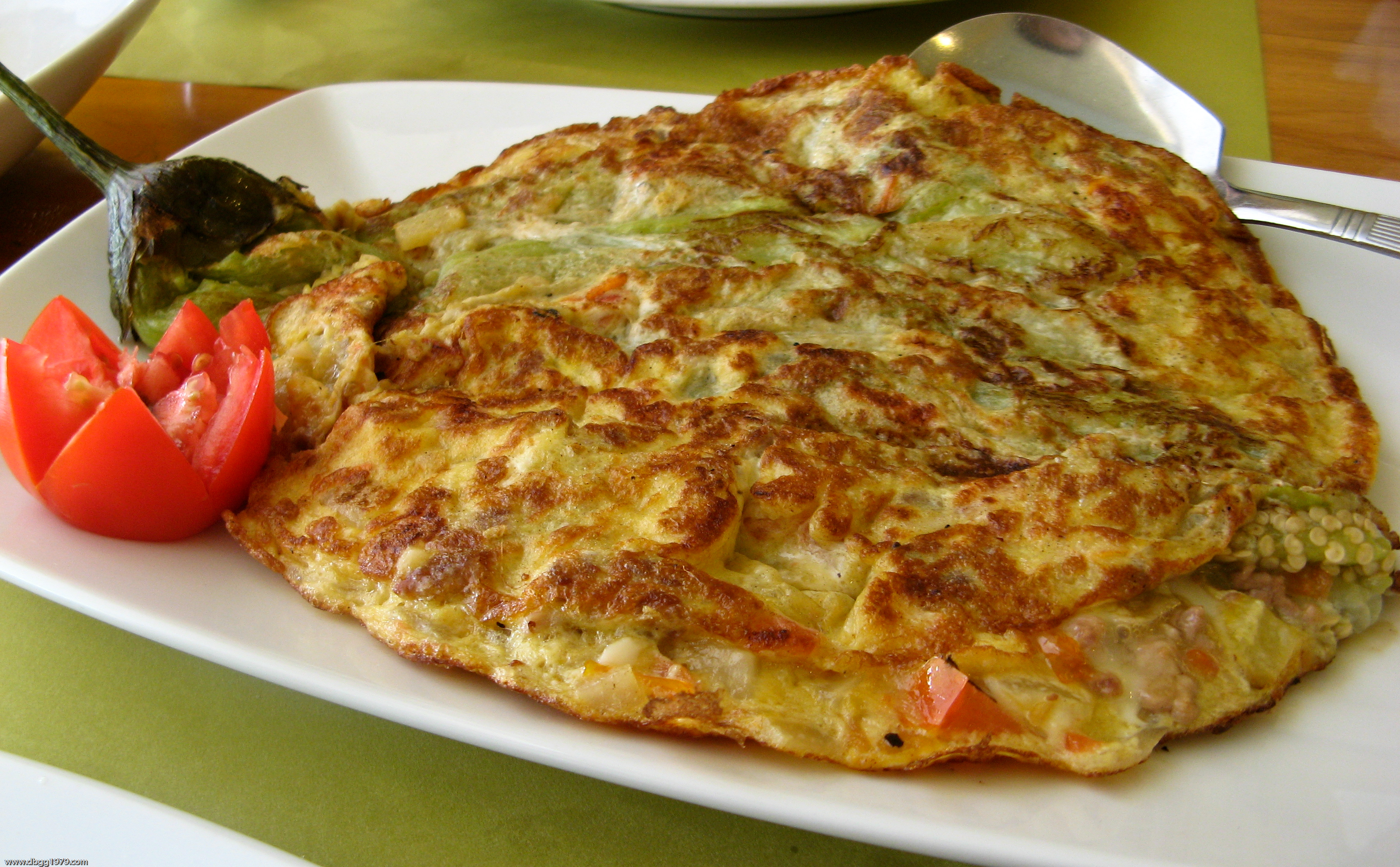
- Top: Tortang talong with calamansi; Bottom: Rellenong talong from Cebu stuffed with ground meat and vegetables
- Alternative names: Eggplant omelette, tortalong, torta talong
- Course: Main course, side dish
- Place of origin: Philippines
- Serving temperature: Warm
- Main ingredients: Eggplant, eggs, salt
- Variations: Rellenong talong
- Similar dishes: Poqui poqui

Tortang talong, also known as eggplant omelette, is an omelette or fritter from Filipino cuisine made by pan-frying grilled whole eggplants dipped in an egg mixture. It is a popular breakfast and lunch meal in the Philippines. A common variant of is rellenong talong, which is stuffed with meat, seafood, and/or vegetables.

In 2022, TasteAtlas ranked tortang talong as the best-rated egg dish in the world, while kuku sabzi from Iran and huevos rancheros from Mexico came in second and third place respectively.

== Etymology ==
The name tortang talong means "eggplant omelette"; from a suffixed form of torta ("omelette" or "flat cake"), and talong (eggplant). The name is sometimes shortened to tortalong.

== Description ==
The basic tortang talong recipe involves first grilling the whole eggplant until the flesh is soft and the skin becomes charred and almost black. This can be done in a charcoal grill, bbq, in an oven using baking pan, or over a direct flame whilst pan is covered or simply using aluminum foil and placed in direct heat such as a fire. The grilling using charcoal gives the eggplant a characteristic smoky flavor. The charred skin is then peeled off, although the stalk is retained. The flesh is mashed flat with a fork and dipped into a beaten egg mixture seasoned with a salt and spices to taste. The eggplant is then pan-fried until the outside is golden brown and crispy, while the core remains soft and creamy.

The most common varieties of eggplants in the Philippines are the long and slender purple kind. When larger and rounder eggplant varieties are used, the eggplant may need to be halved or quartered (with the stalk still attached) so they can be grilled more evenly.

Tortang talong is most commonly eaten for breakfast or lunch. It is served on white rice, sometimes accompanied with a dipping sauce (like soy sauce, vinegar, banana ketchup, etc.) or additional seasoning (like black pepper, calamansi, or chilis). It can also be served as a side dish to meat dishes.

== Variations ==
A notable variant of tortang talong is rellenong talong (also spelled relyenong talong; from Spanish relleno, "stuffed"), commonly anglicized as "stuffed eggplant omelette". This version is cooked in the same way as the regular version, except that the omelette also includes various stuffings of pre-cooked meat (like minced beef or pork or longganisa), seafood, and/or vegetables.

In some versions, the eggplant is not grilled, but is instead boiled, resulting in a softer version that lacks the characteristic smoky flavor of the original dish. Non-traditional restaurant variants may also remove the stalk and puree the eggplant before mixing it with the omelette.

The basic tortang talong recipe as well as rellenong talong stuffed with vegetables are considered vegetarian. A vegan version can also be made using squash, flour, and tofu as an egg substitute.

== See also ==
- Kulawo
- Tortang carne norte
- Tortang kalabasa
- Tortang sardinas
- Poqui poqui
- Ukoy
- Bistek
- Tocino
