= Tortang sardinas =

Filipino omelette

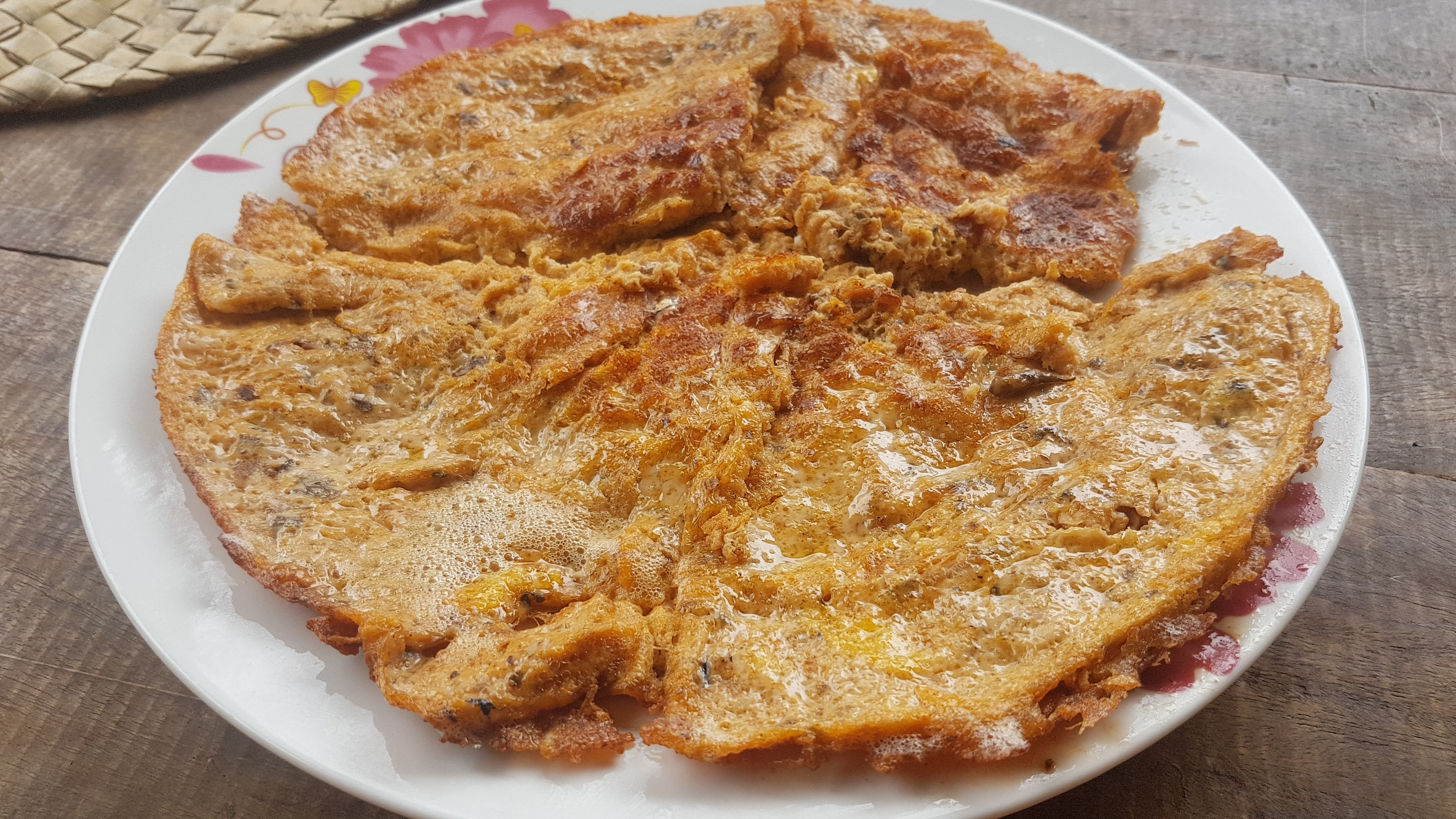
- Alternative names: Tortang tinapa, sardines omelette, canned sardines omelette, tinapa fritters, sardine fritters
- Course: Main course, side dish
- Place of origin: Philippines
- Serving temperature: Warm
- Main ingredients: Tinapa, eggs

Tortang sardinas, also known as tortang tinapa, sardines omelette, or tinapa fritters, is a Filipino omelette made by mixing shredded tinapa (smoked sardines) with eggs. It can also include tomatoes, onions, garlic, salt, ground black pepper, minced spring onions, and/or flour, as well as various other ingredients. It typically uses canned sardines, which comes with a tomato sauce which may or may not also be included. It is commonly regarded as a very cheap and easy meal to prepare, with a reputation similar to instant noodles. It is usually eaten for breakfast with white rice and banana ketchup. It can also be eaten as a sandwich with pandesal bread.

== See also ==
- Tortang talong
- Tortang carne norte
- Tortang kalabasa
- Poqui poqui
- Ukoy
