= Carne norte guisado =

Filipino corned beef dish

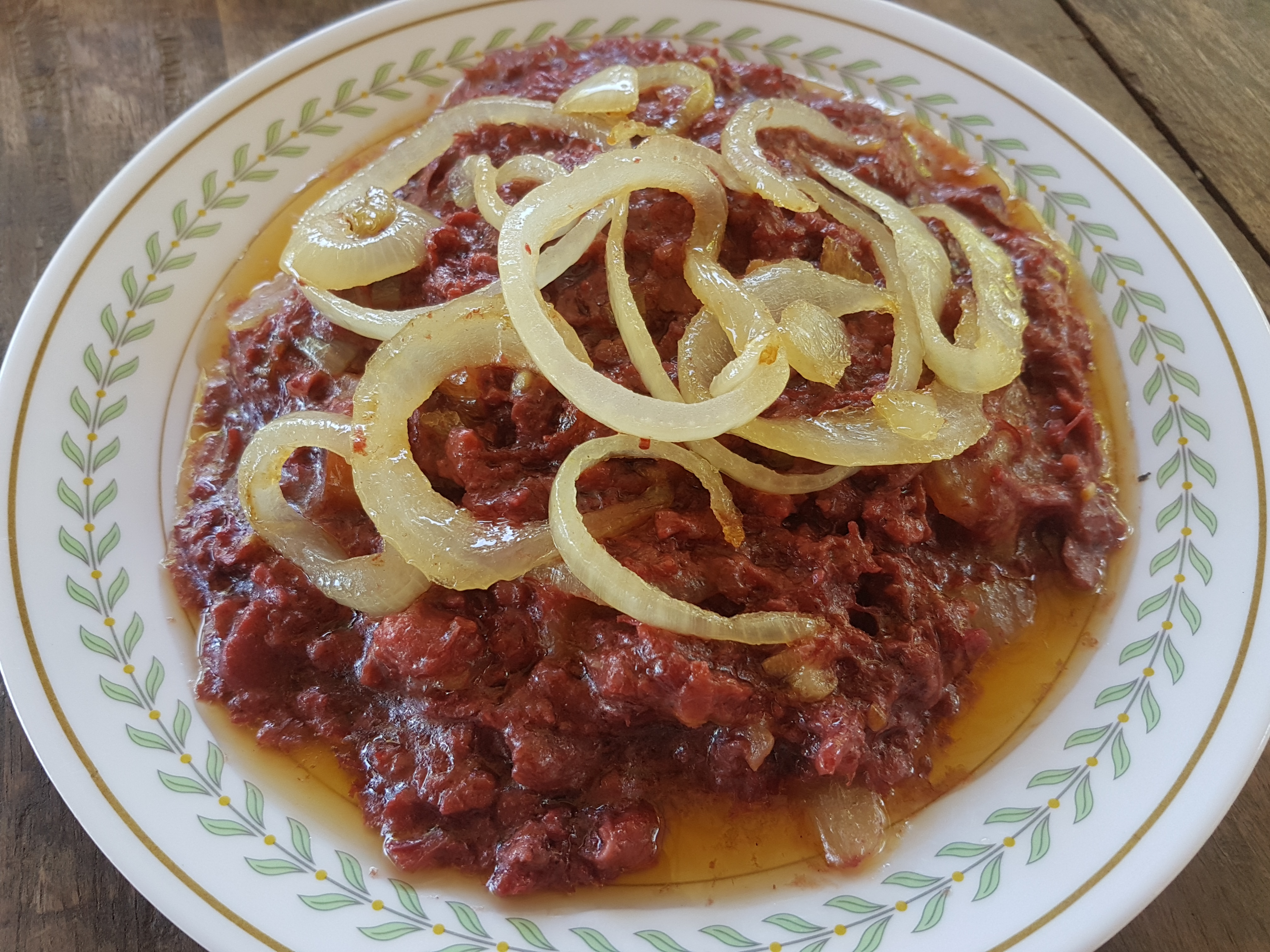
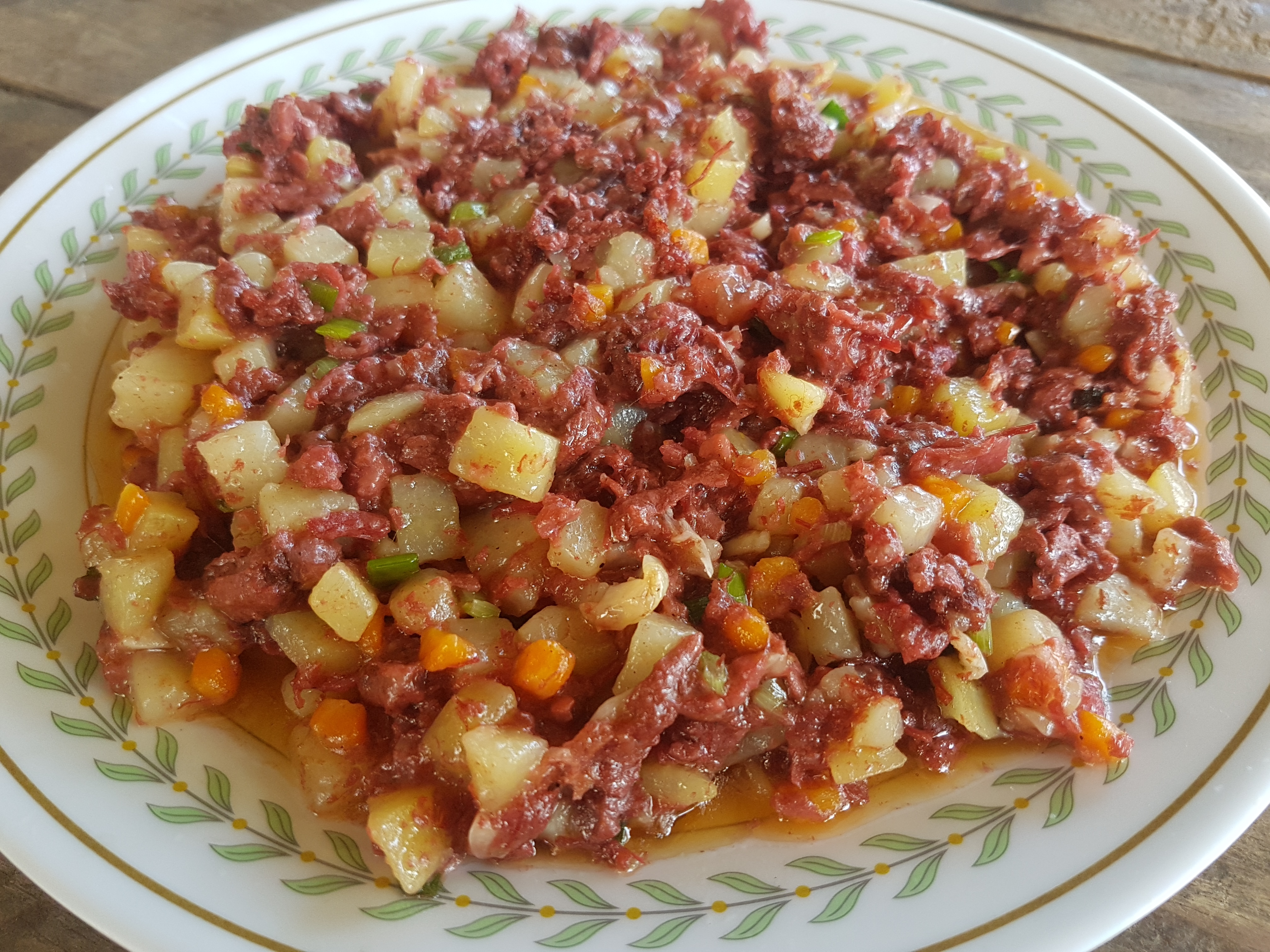
- Top: Carne norte guisado with onions; Bottom: Carne norte guisado with potatoes
- Alternative names: Corned beef guisado, Ginisang carne norte, Ginisang corned beef, Carne norte con patatas
- Course: Main course, side dish
- Place of origin: Philippines
- Serving temperature: Warm
- Main ingredients: Corned beef, onions
- Variations: Sinabawang corned beef
- Similar dishes: Tortang carne norte, corned beef hash

Carne norte guisado, also known as corned beef guisado, is a Filipino dish made from shredded canned corned beef (carne norte) sautéed with onion. It is a very simple dish and is popularly eaten for breakfast with white rice or pandesal. Finely diced potatoes, carrots, scallions, tomatoes, cabbage, bell pepper, and garlic may also be added. A notable variant of the dish is sinabawang corned beef, which is made by adding beef stock or water to the dish after sautéing, turning it into a soup or stew.

== See also ==
- Corned beef hash – Dish of meat, potatoes, and fried onions
- Tortang carne norte
- Poqui poqui
