= Poqui poqui =

Filipino-Ilocano dish of eggs and chopped eggplants

Poquí poquí
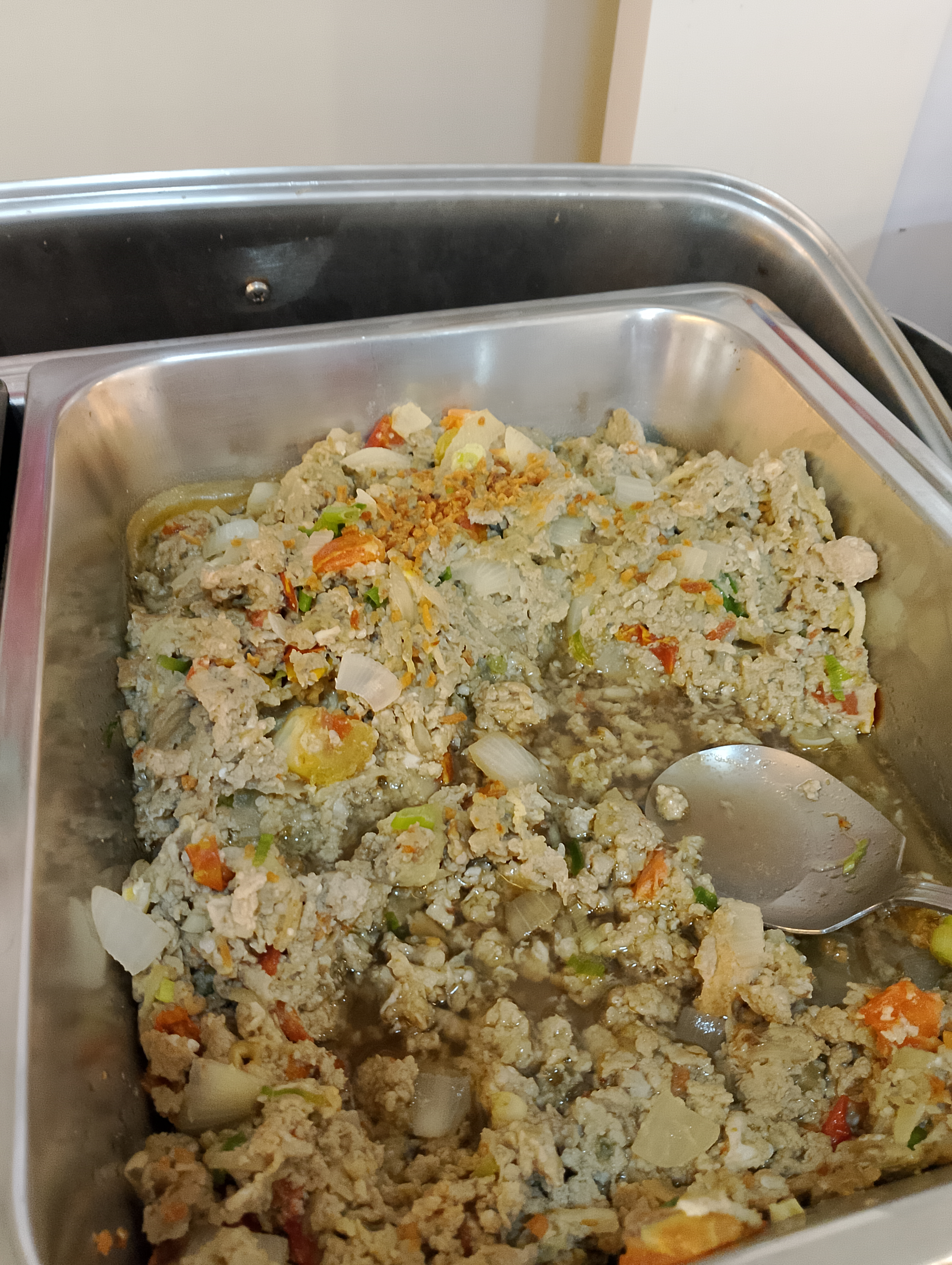
- A scrambled egg dish made with roasted eggplant, sautéed garlic, onions, tomatoes, and bagoong isda called Poquí poquí
- Alternative names: Puké puké, Poké poké, Pukí pukí or Pokí pokí
- Course: Main Course, Side Dish
- Place of origin: Philippines
- Region or state: Ilocos Region
- Associated cuisine: Filipino Cuisine
- Serving temperature: Warm, Room temperature
- Main ingredients: Eggplant, egg, tomato, onion, garlic, bagoong isda
- Similar dishes: Tortang talong, Kulawo, Tortang kalabasa

Poqui poqui (also spelled puké puké, poké poké or pukí pukí) is a Filipino scrambled egg dish from the Ilocos Region in northwestern Luzon, Philippines. It is made with roasted eggplant, sautéed garlic, onions, tomatoes, eggs, and fermented fish sauce, locally known as buggúong or bagoong isda. The dish has a savory, smoky, and creamy flavor and is commonly served as a main course with steamed rice or as an accompaniment to grilled meat or fish.

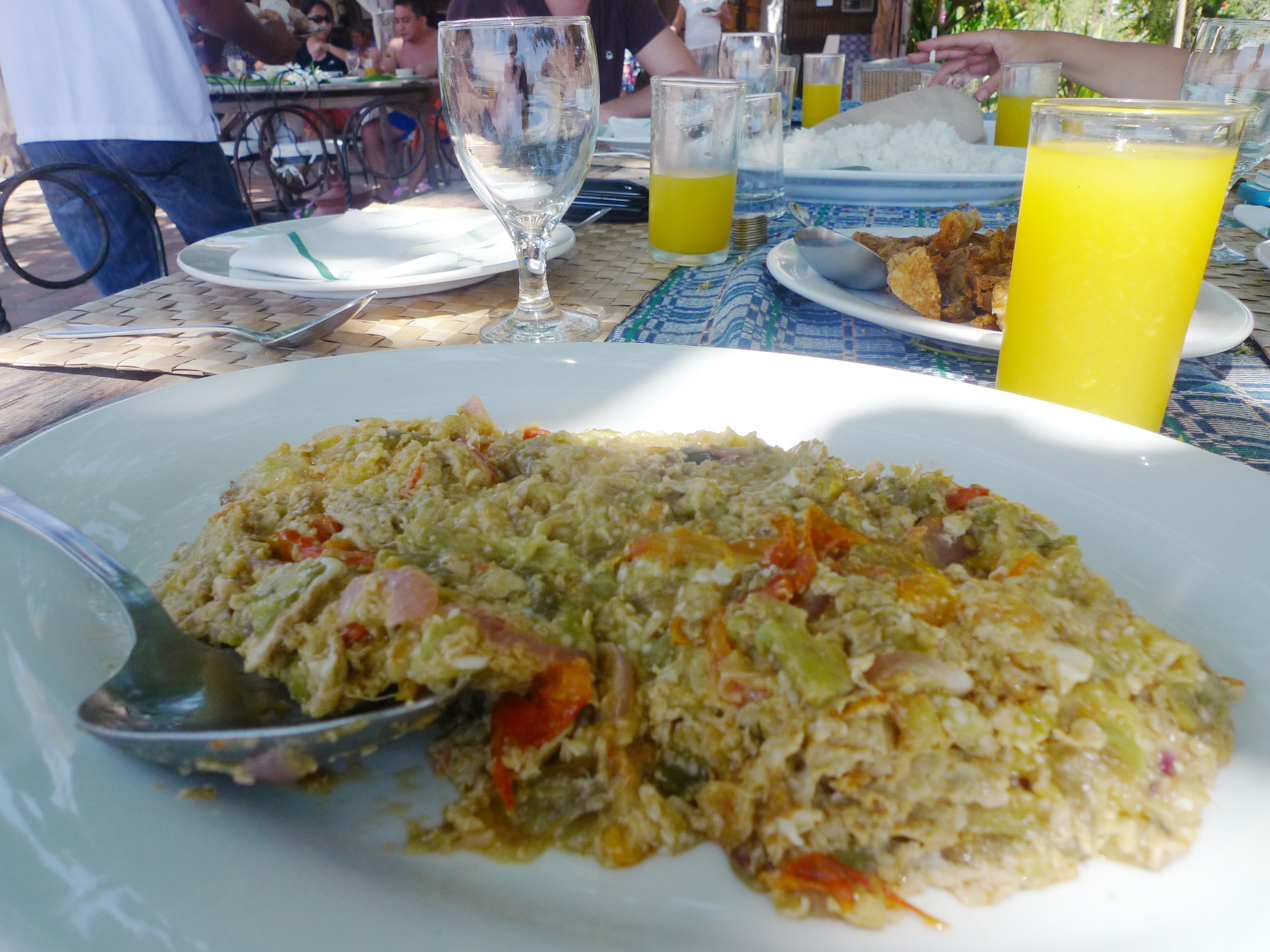
Poqui poqui served in Currimao, Ilocos Norte, a staple household dish among Ilocanos.

Poqui poqui is often compared to tortang talong, another Filipino eggplant-based dish. Unlike tortang talong, which is typically pan-fried as a whole omelette, poqui poqui is prepared by mashing the roasted eggplant and gently scrambling it with eggs, resulting in a softer, creamier texture. It is usually seasoned with fermented fish sauce rather than salt or soy sauce.

== Etymology ==
The etymology of poqui poqui is uncertain and subject to several interpretations. One proposed origin links the name to the Hawaiian dish poke, reflecting the historical migration of Ilocano sugarcane workers to Hawaii during the American colonial period of the Philippines. Despite the similarity in names, the two dishes are otherwise unrelated. Some accounts suggest that the Hawaiian word poki (or poqui), meaning “to cut up” or “to mash,” may have influenced the name.

Another proposed origin traces the term to the Ilocano word pukpuk, which means “to mash” or “to mix,” describing the dish's method of preparation. No single explanation has been definitively established.

== See also ==
- Kulawo
- Tortang talong
- Tortang kalabasa
- Ukoy
- Carne norte guisado
