= Kulawo =

Filipino eggplant salad

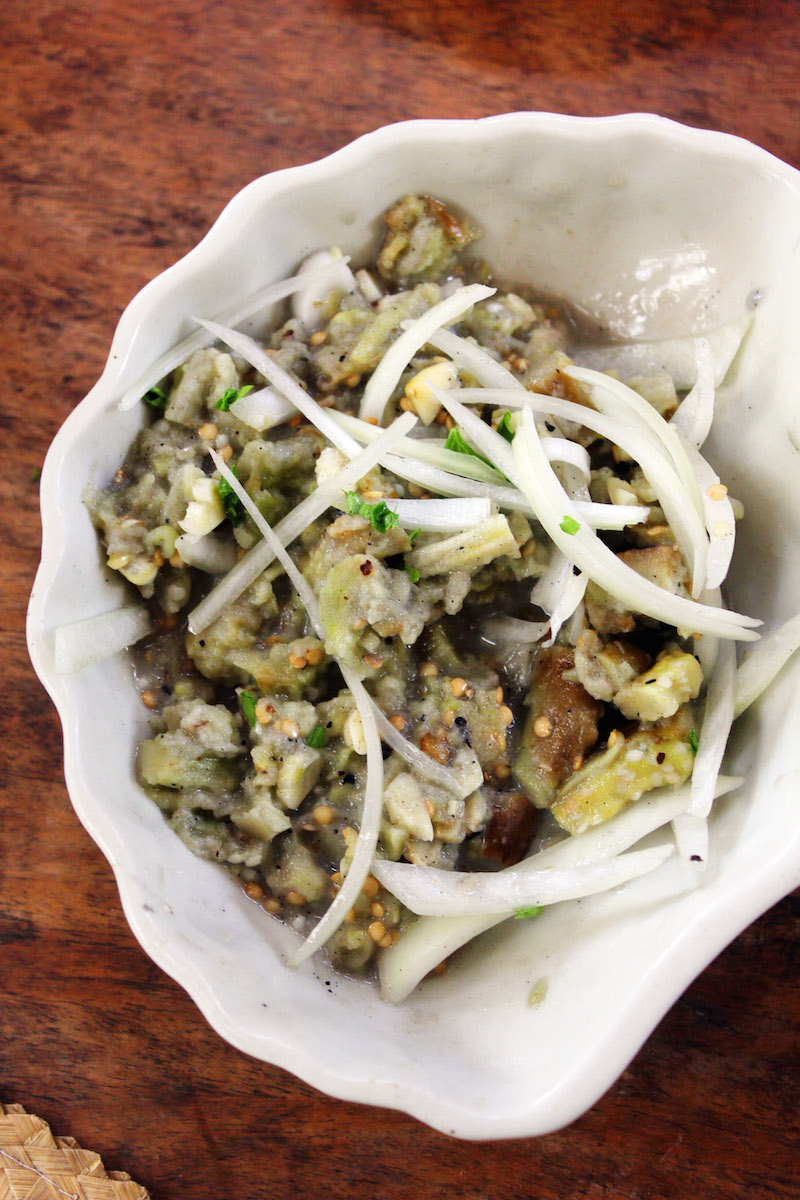
- Alternative names: Minanok
- Course: Main course, side dish
- Place of origin: The Philippines
- Serving temperature: Warm
- Main ingredients: Coconut milk, banana blossom/eggplant, red onion, salt, black pepper, vinegar
- Variations: Kulawong talong, kulawong puso ng saging

Kulawo is a Filipino salad made with either minced banana blossoms (kulawong puso ng saging) or grilled eggplant (kulawong talong) cooked in coconut milk which distinctively is extracted from grated coconut meat toasted on live coals. It is a pre-colonial dish originating from the provinces of Laguna and Quezon. Kulawo is a type of kilawin and ginataan. It is fully vegan and has a unique smoky taste sometimes compared to smoked meat or fish dishes.

== Description ==
Kulawo uses either banana blossoms or eggplant. When preparing banana blossoms, it they are finely diced or julienned and mixed with salt for a few minutes and then squeezed dry and washed to remove the bitter sap. With eggplant, the vegetable is first grilled until soft and then peeled and mashed. Then grated coconut is placed in a container with live coals (usually from burning coconut husks) until the grated coconut is toasted brown and emits a slightly burned odor. In modern versions, coconut may also be toasted briefly in an oven. The toasted and grated coconut is removed from the coals and moistened with vinegar.

It is allowed to cool down and squeezed to extract coconut milk which has a smoky flavor. The coconut milk is heated slowly with vinegar (usually coconut or cane vinegar), red onions, salt, and black pepper. Other spices may be added to taste including garlic, ginger, shallots, fish sauce, and chili peppers. The coconut milk must be heated slowly and not allowed to boil to avoid curdling. The banana blossoms are then added last and cooked until tender.

== Variations ==
Kulawong puso ng saging is sometimes known as minanok ("done like chicken"), due to its texture being similar to shredded chicken. Despite the name, it does not contain any meat.

Some versions add cooked meat like pork belly (liempo), especially in adaptations in other regions. This is non-traditional.

== See also ==
- Kinilaw
- Poqui poqui
- Tiyula itum
- Tortang talong
