= Basket (food) =

Method of serving food

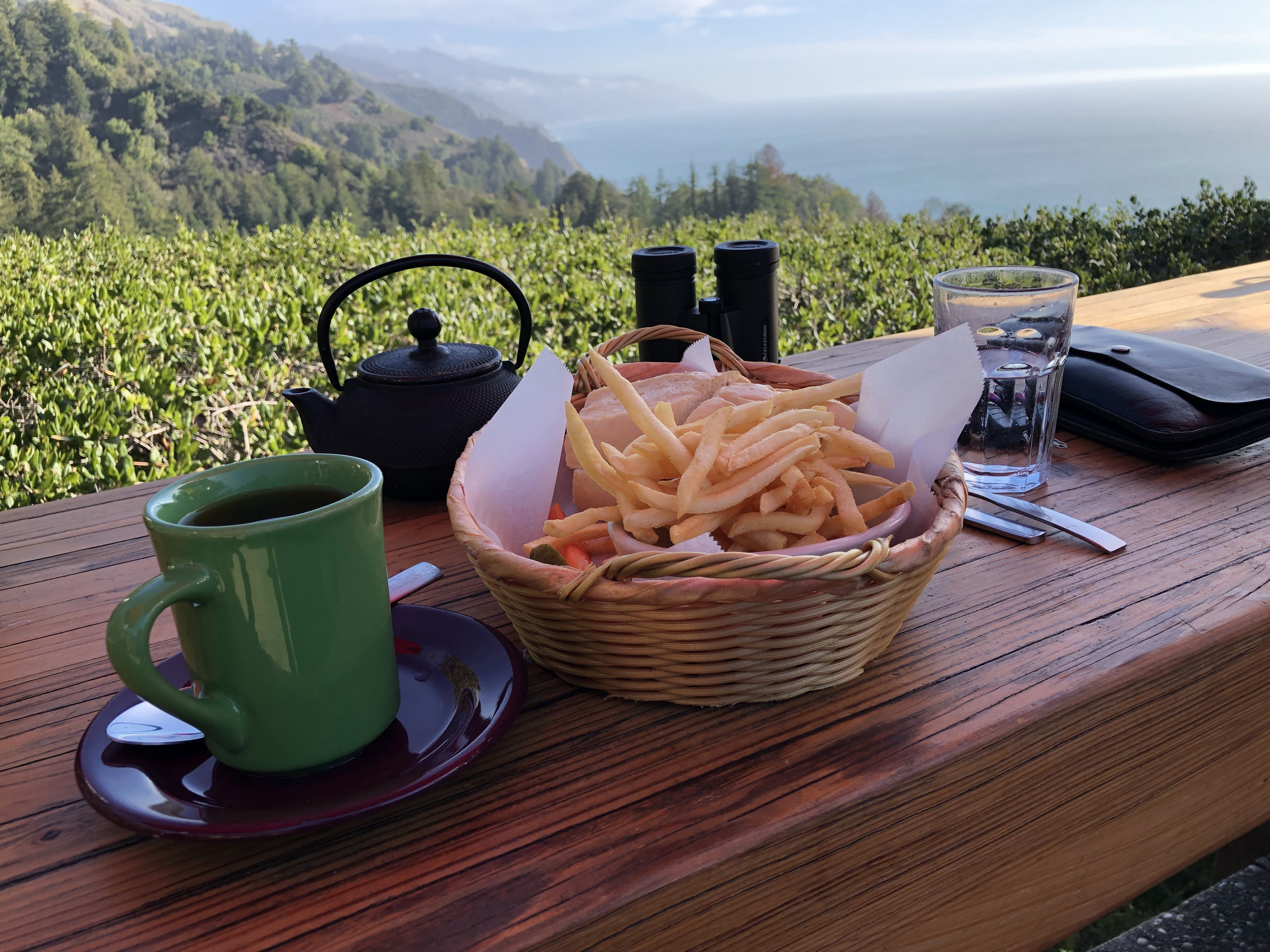
A burger and french fries served in a basket

Food served in a basket, a basket platter or a basket with fries is a sandwich or other main dish that is served on top of a basket of an accompanying foodstuff, usually french fries. The "basket" is usually either made of plastic and lined with paper, or is simply a disposable paperboard box or tray. Sometimes the basket contains other side dishes as well, such as a container of coleslaw or a pickle. This term is common in the Midwestern U.S.

== United Kingdom ==
In the United Kingdom, chicken in a basket, fried chicken on a bed of chips, was a popular dish in pubs and modest restaurants from the late 1960s through the 1970s. In the 1970s, the dish became so ubiquitous in UK venues offering evening entertainment that the locations became known to musicians and entertainers as the "chicken-in-a-basket circuit".

In the TV drama Life on Mars, Sam "invents" chicken in a basket while working undercover in a pub.
