= Tortang carne norte =

Filipino corned beef fritter

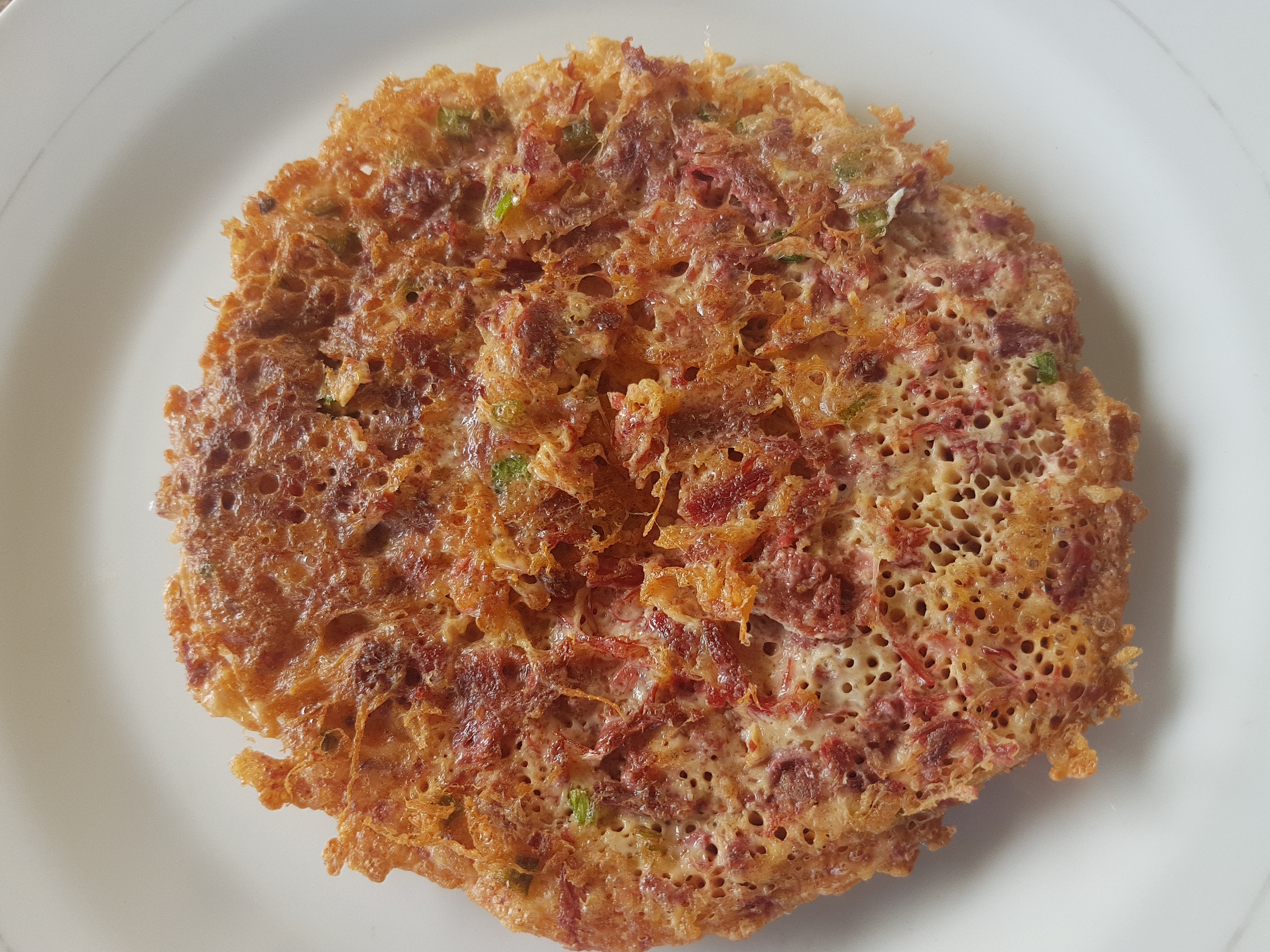
- Alternative names: Corned beef omelette, carne norte omelet, tortang corned beef
- Course: Main course, side dish
- Place of origin: Philippines
- Serving temperature: Warm
- Main ingredients: Corned beef, eggs
- Similar dishes: Tortang giniling, Tortang sardinas

Tortang carne norte, also known as corned beef omelette, is an omelette or fritter from Filipino cuisine made by pan-frying an egg and shredded canned corned beef (carne norte) mixture. It is usually seasoned with salt and black pepper, but it can also include onions, scallions, garlic, and/or sugar. It is a popular breakfast meal in the Philippines and is eaten with white rice or pandesal.

== See also ==
- Carne norte guisado
- Tortang sardinas
- Tortang kalabasa
- Ukoy
