= Tortillitas de camarones =

Shrimp fritters

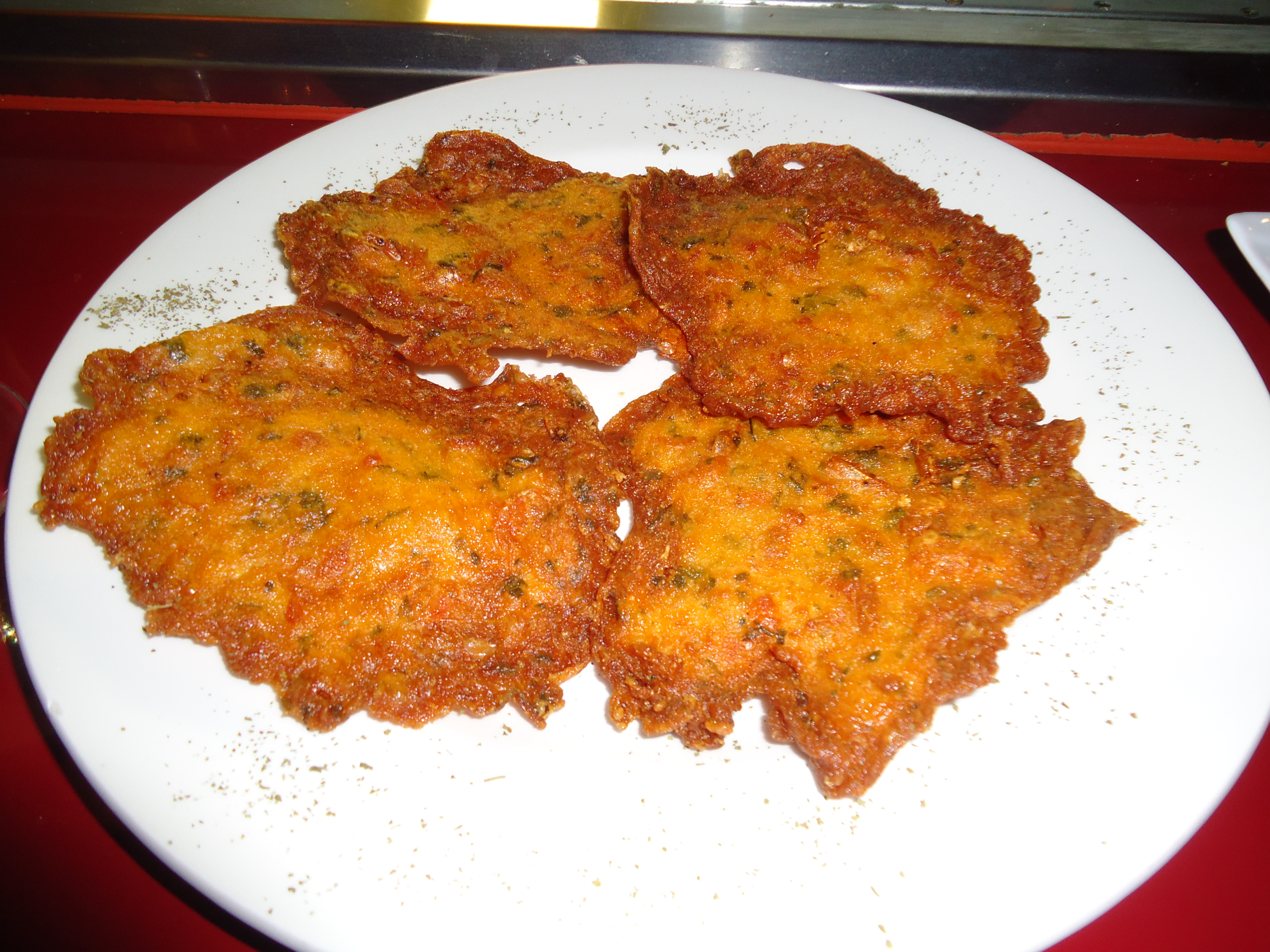
- Tortillitas de camarones served in a restaurant in Zaragoza
- Type: Appetizer or snack
- Place of origin: Andalusia
- Region or state: Cádiz
- Main ingredients: Wheat flour, chickpea flour, onions, parsley, shrimp

Tortillitas de camarones are shrimp fritters from the province of Cádiz in Andalusia, Spain. They are made with a batter of wheat flour, chickpea flour, water, onion (alternatively shallot or scallion), parsley, shrimp, salt and pepper. The batter is then fried on both sides in a pan with plenty of olive oil. Usually it is served with small side dishes.

In Andalusia the shrimp species Palaemon longirostris is typically used, for which camarón is the local name. Because the shrimp are so small it is too difficult to shell them, so they are cooked whole. This specific species of shrimp is hard to come by outside of Andalusia. A different species of shelled shrimp can serve as a substitute, but without Palaemon longirostris the taste of the dish will be different.

The dish originates from either Cádiz or San Fernando, or possibly both. The dish became well known in the nineteenth century, but may have been created as early as the start of the sixteenth century. The Genoese colony present in Cádiz probably contributed to its invention, which might have resulted from the combination of Genoese farinata and Spanish gachuela. In the predecessor of the dish vegetables might have been used instead of shrimp.

== See also ==
- Okoy, a similar dish from the Philippines
- Bánh cống, a similar dish from Vietnam
