= Tortang kalabasa =

Filipino squash omelette

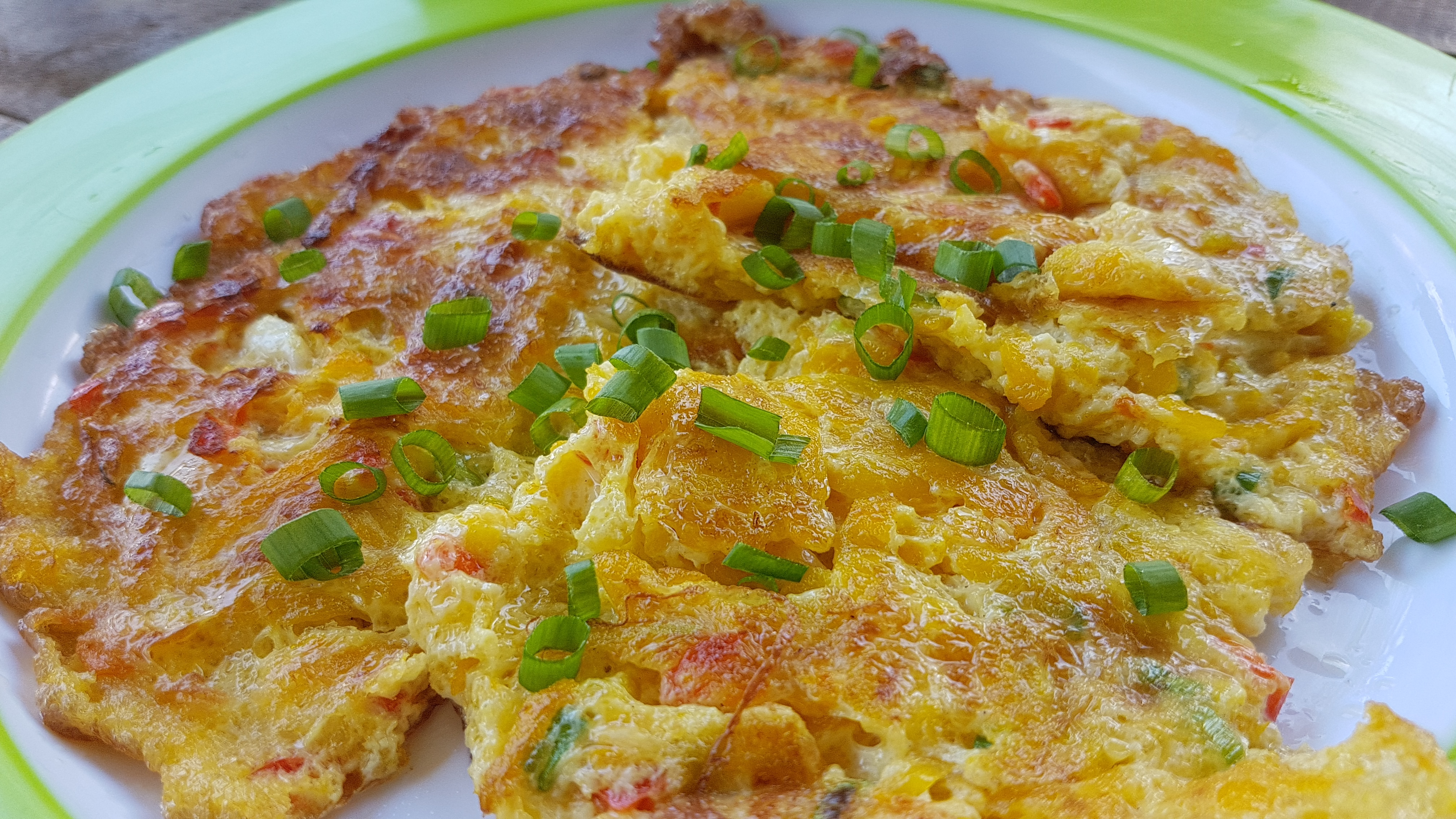
- Alternative names: Squash omelette, squash fritters, okoy na kalabasa, squash okoy
- Course: Main course, side dish
- Place of origin: Philippines
- Serving temperature: Warm
- Main ingredients: Calabaza

Tortang kalabasa, also known as squash fritters, is a Filipino omelette made by mixing mashed or finely-grated pumpkin (calabaza) with flour, water, egg, salt, and pepper. Other ingredients like minced vegetables can also be added. It is very similar to okoy, but the latter is made with glutinous rice batter rather than eggs. Regardless it is sometimes known as squash okoy or okoy na kalabasa.

== See also ==
- Tortang talong
- Tortang sardinas
- Tortang carne norte
- Poqui poqui
