= Bánh cống =

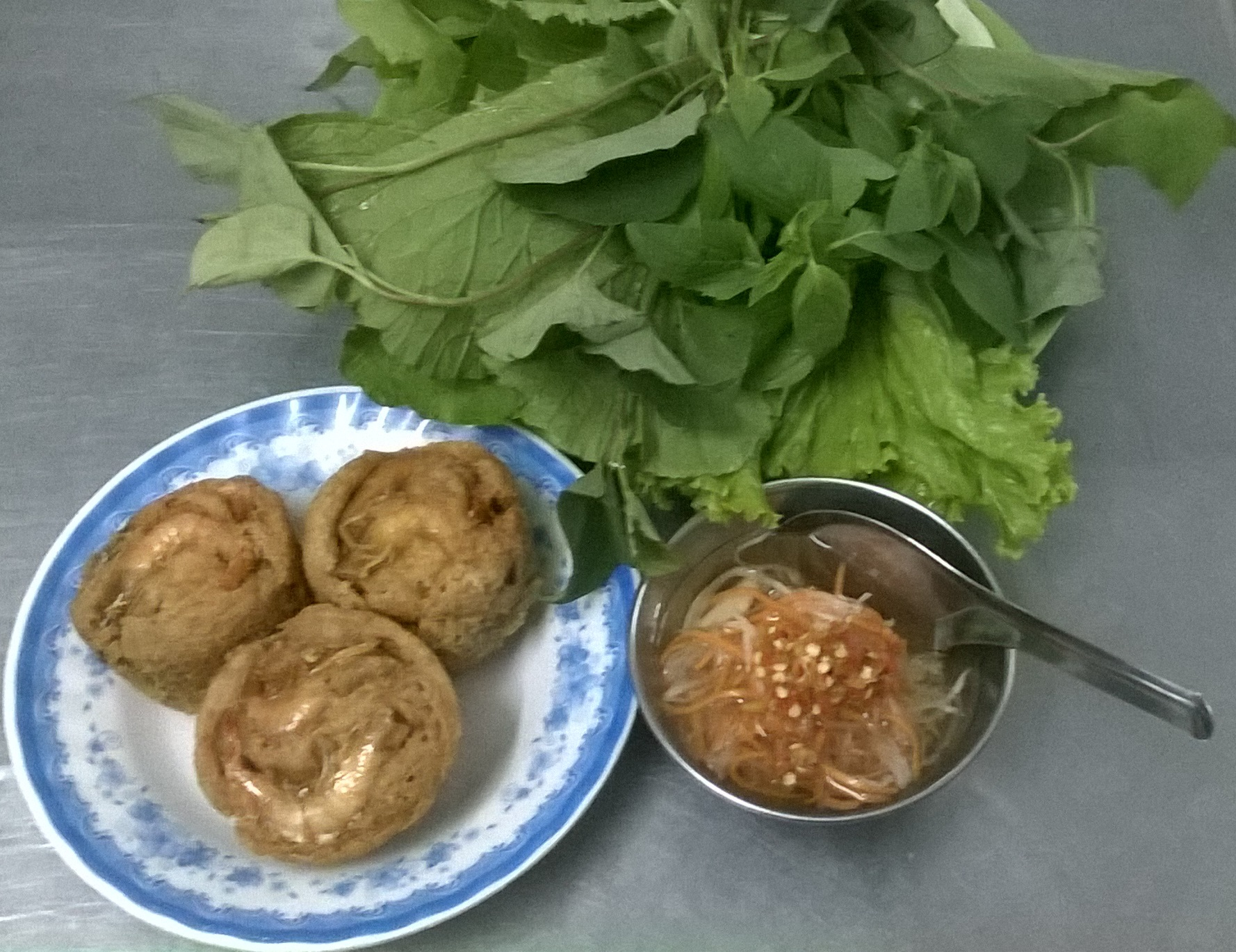
- Bánh cống in Cần Thơ
- Region or state: Sóc Trăng province, Southern Vietnam
- Associated cuisine: Khmer and Vietnamese
- Created by: Khmer Krom
- Serving temperature: Hot
- Main ingredients: rice flour, mung beans, shrimps, and stir-fried minced pork with shallots
- Similar dishes: bánh giá, bánh khọt, bánh căn, bánh tôm Hồ Tây

Fried shrimp cake (Khmer: នំកំប៉ុង, nom kapong; Vietnamese: bánh cống) is a specialty of Khmer Krom. It is thought to be originated in Mỹ Xuyên district, Sóc Trăng province, Southern Vietnam, and over time, the dish has spread across the Mekong Delta, as well as some other localities in Vietnam.

The main ingredients of fried shrimp cakes are rice flour, mung beans, shrimp, and stir-fried minced pork with shallots. A mixture of those ingredients are placed in a cake mould, topped with more rice flour and shrimp, and then deep-fried in oil until crispy. They are eaten by wrapping the fried shrimp cake in lettuce, topping with herbs, and dipping it in sweet and sour fish sauce. The dish is consumed hot.

== See also ==
- Okoy, a similar Filipino dish
- Tortillitas de camarones, a similar Spanish dish
