= Okoy =

Filipino crispy deep-fried fritters

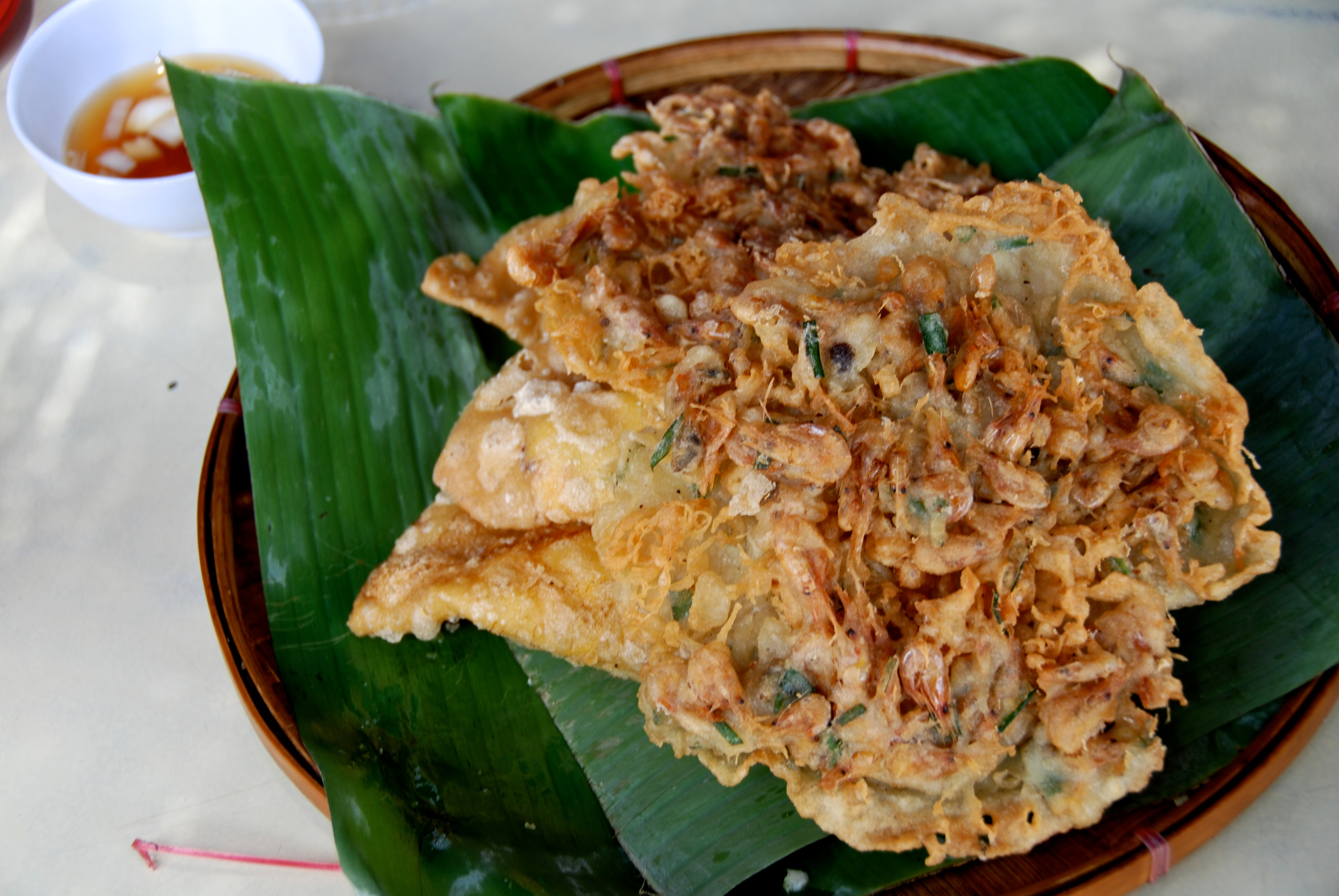
- Shrimp okoy from Vigan, Ilocos Sur
- Alternative names: Ukoy
- Course: Main course, side dish
- Place of origin: Philippines
- Serving temperature: Warm
- Similar dishes: Camaron rebosado, calamares, bazun khwet kyaw, bakwan

Okoy, okoi or ukoy, are Filipino crispy deep-fried fritters made with glutinous rice batter, unshelled small shrimp, and various vegetables, including calabaza, sweet potato, cassava, mung bean sprouts, scallions and julienned carrots, onions, and green papaya. They are traditionally served with vinegar-based dipping sauces. They are eaten on their own or with white rice. They are popular for breakfast, snacks, or appetizers. Okoy are sometimes dyed bright orange with achuete seeds.

Okoy has numerous variations using a variety of other ingredients, including replacing the shrimp with small fish or calamari. Okoy batter can also be made with regular flour, rice flour, or an egg and cornstarch mixture. It can also refer to omelettes made with mashed calabaza or sweet potato, with or without the shrimp.

== Etymology ==
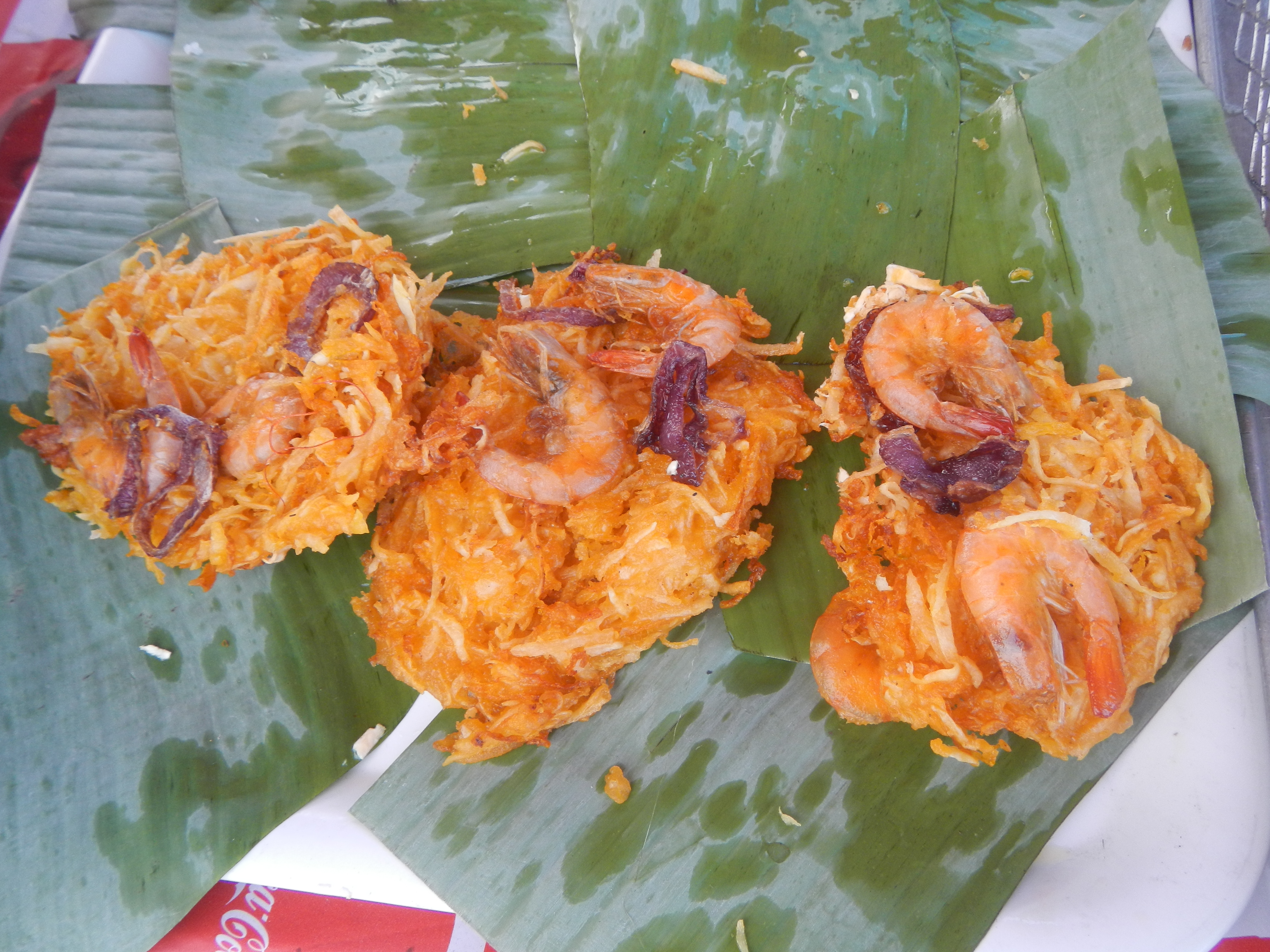
Shrimp okoy sold during the Duman Festival of Santa Rita, Pampanga

According to Filipino linguist Gloria Chan-Yap, the name okoy comes from Hokkien ō+kuè, meaning "cake made from taro". However, they are very different dishes. The Hokkien dish is made from deep-fried taro and minced pork, while the Philippine dish utilizes none of those ingredients. The only similarity between them is that they are both deep-fried and pancake-shaped.

== Description ==
The most basic traditional okoy recipe uses a small amount of galapong (ground soaked glutinous rice) as the batter, spiced to taste with onion, garlic, salt, and scallions. It is mixed with mashed kalabasa (calabaza) and unshelled small shrimp. They are deep-fried as small flat patties until golden brown. Excess oil is drained on paper towels and the dish is served warm and crispy. Okoy batter can also be mixed with kamote (sweet potato) or kamoteng kahoy (cassava), instead of, or in addition to calabaza. Other ingredients are also traditionally added, including mung bean sprouts (togue) and/or julienned carrots, onions, and green papaya. The dish is sometimes dyed bright orange with achuete seeds.

Okoy can be eaten on its own or with white rice. It is usually eaten as a snack, as appetizers, or as a breakfast meal. Traditionally, it is served with a vinegar-based dipping sauce; like sinamak (vinegar with labuyo chilis, ginger, garlic, peppercorns, and onion) or pinakurat (vinegar with fish sauce, labuyo chilis, peppercorns, ginger, garlic, and dried mangoes). It can also be dipped in banana ketchup, tomato ketchup, sweet and sour sauces, or even garlic mayonnaise.

== Variants ==
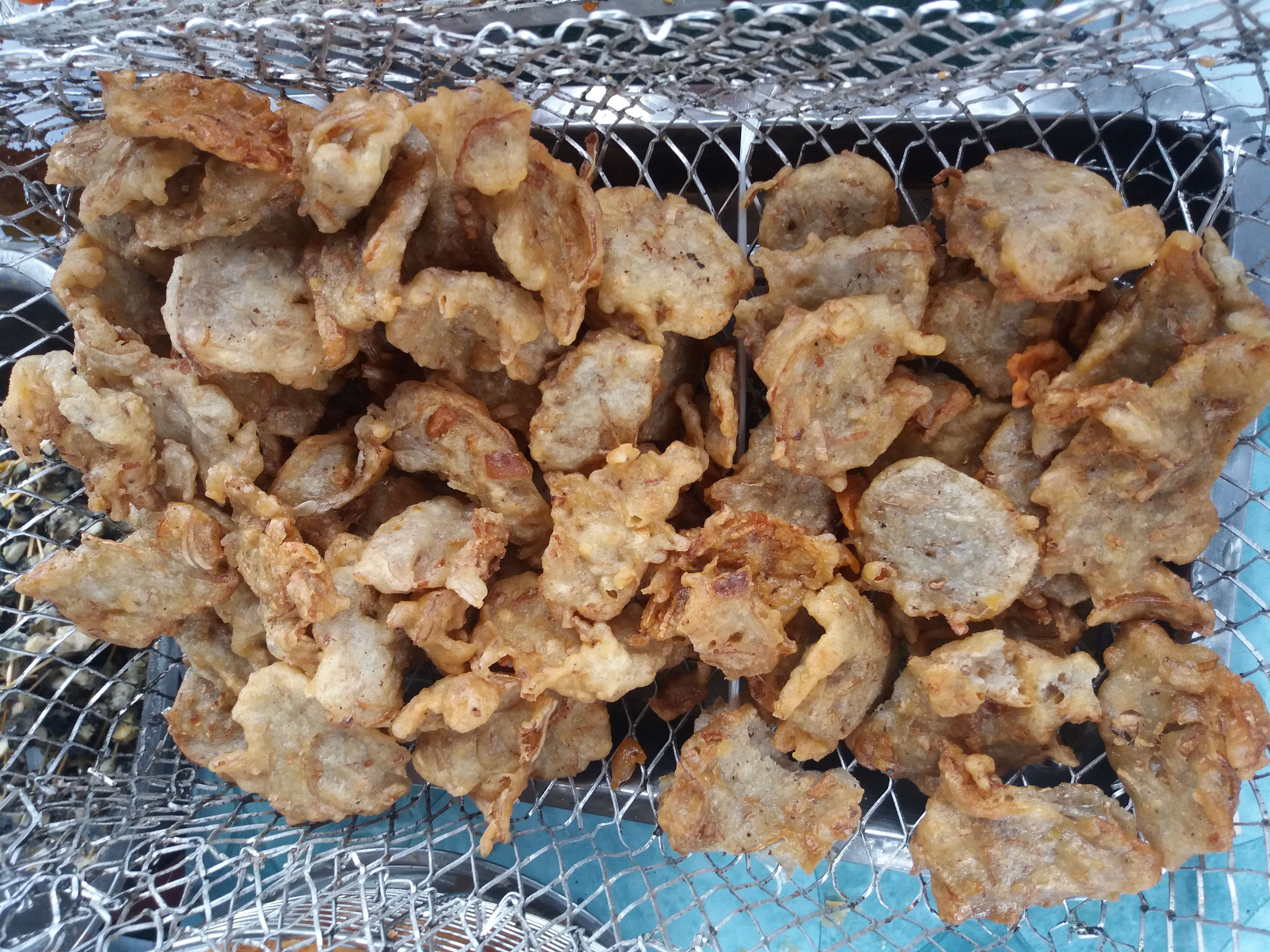
Okoy na puso ng saging, an okoy variant using banana flowers

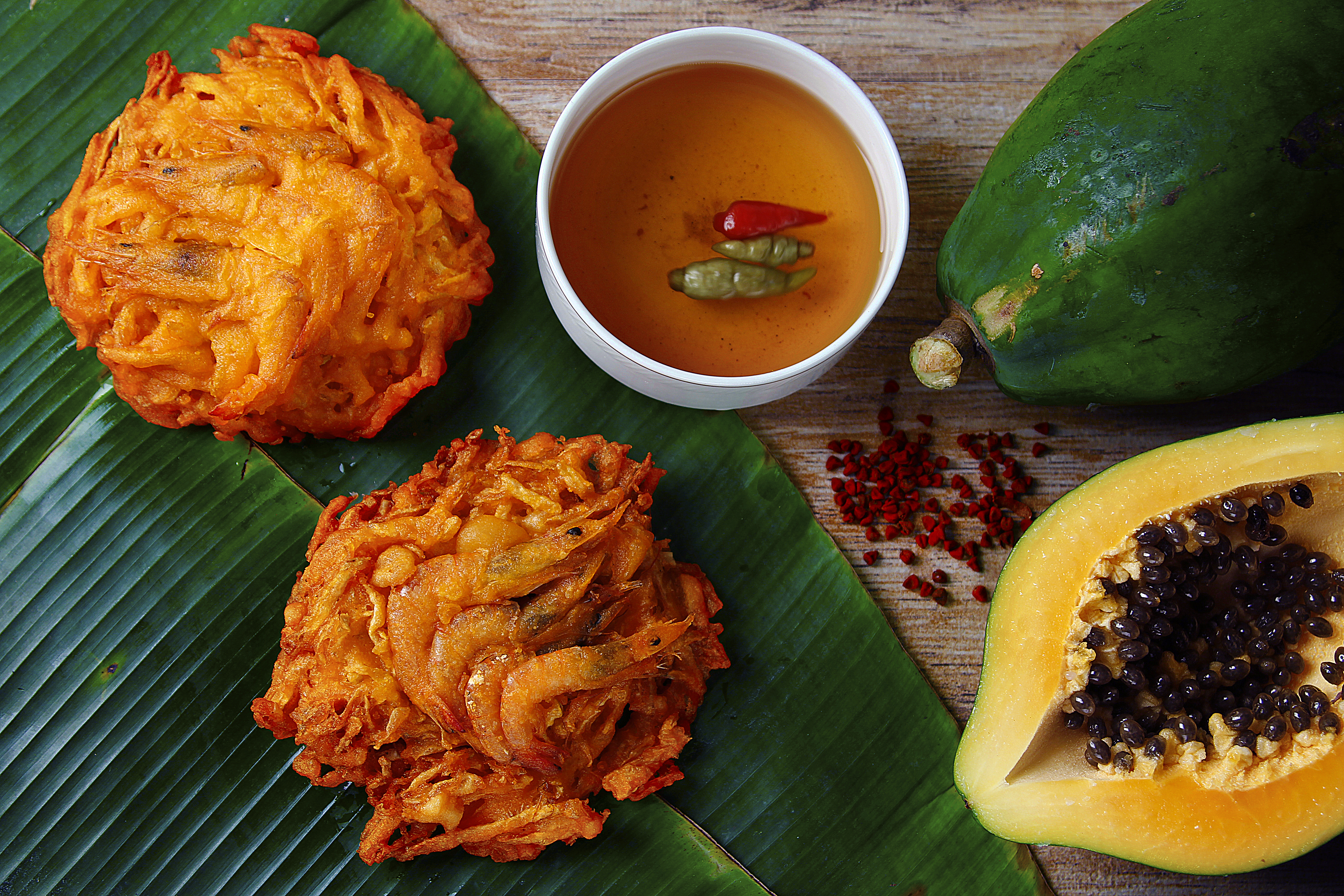
Shrimp okoy with dipping sauce

Modern versions typically use regular flour or rice flour, instead of galapong. Egg mixed with cornstarch can also be used. Okoy is also used to refer to savory omelettes made with mashed calabaza or sweet potato (more properly tortang kalabasa or tortang kamote, respectively), with or without the shrimp.

The shrimp may also be omitted completely, especially when using mashed calabaza or sweet potato. The shrimp can be replaced with small fish like dilis (anchovies) or dulong (noodlefish), as well as calamari or even shredded chicken. Larger shrimp, shelled and butterflied can also be used, and can be cooked tempura-style.

The dish can be modified easily to use other non-traditional ingredients, including potatoes, bell peppers, peppercorns, tokwa (tofu), grated coconut, and apulid (water chestnuts). A unique variant of the dish uses banana flowers (puso ng saging, lit. "banana heart") cooked in batter.

A similar dish is tortang dulong or maranay which is an omelette made from very small fish from the family Salangidae known as dulong in Tagalog and ipon, libgao, or maranay in Visayan.

=== Giant Okoy Bilao ===
A 16 foot diameter 'Giant Okoy Bilao' creation used 200 kilograms of shredded calabaza and served 2,400 visitors.

== See also ==
- Bakwan udang, a similar Indonesian dish
- Bánh cống, a similar Vietnamese dish
- Tortillitas de camarones, a similar Spanish dish
