= Side dish =

Food accompanying a meal's main course

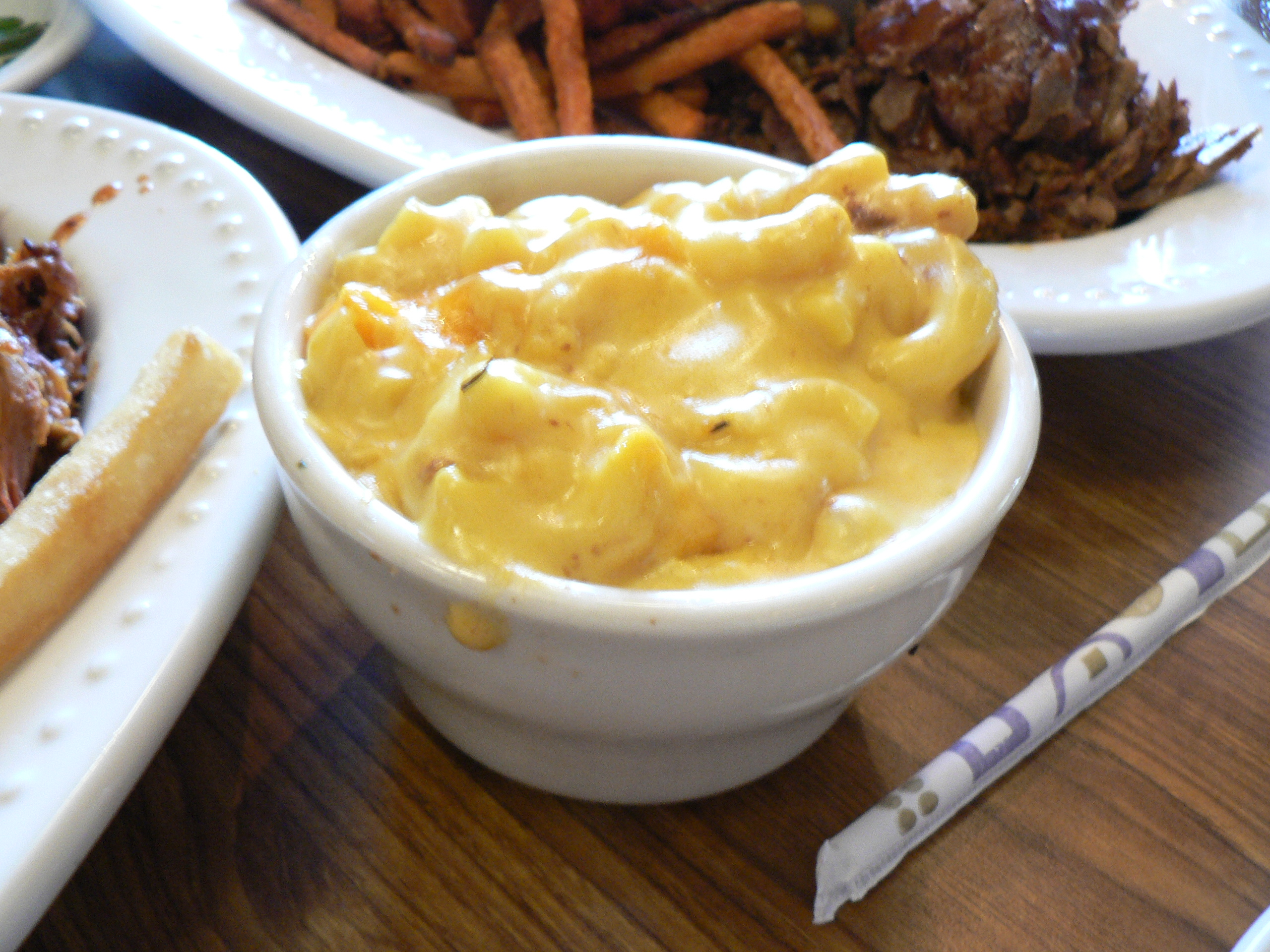
A side dish of macaroni and cheese in a ramekin

A side dish, sometimes referred to as a side order, side item, or simply a side, is a food item that accompanies the entrée or main course at a meal.

== Common types ==
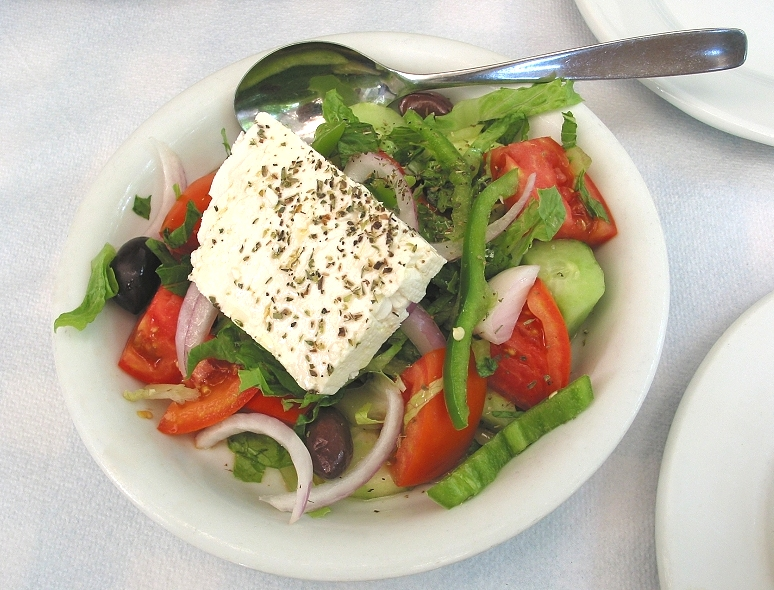
A side dish of Greek salad

Side dishes such as salad, potatoes and bread are commonly used with main courses throughout many countries of the western world. Rice and couscous have grown to be quite popular throughout Europe, especially at formal occasions (with couscous appearing more commonly at dinner parties with Middle Eastern dishes).

When used as an adjective qualifying the name of a dish, the term 'side' usually refers to a smaller portion served as a side dish, rather than a larger, main dish-sized serving. For example, a "side salad" is usually served in a small bowl or salad plate.

Some restaurants offer a limited selection of side dishes which are included with the price of the main course as a combination meal. In contrast, sometimes side dishes are ordered separately from an a la carte menu.

French fries are a common side dish served at fast-food restaurants and other American cuisine restaurants. In response to criticism about the high fat and calorie content of French fries, some fast-food chains offer other side dishes, such as salads, as substitutes for the standard French fries with their combination meals.

=== List of side dishes ===
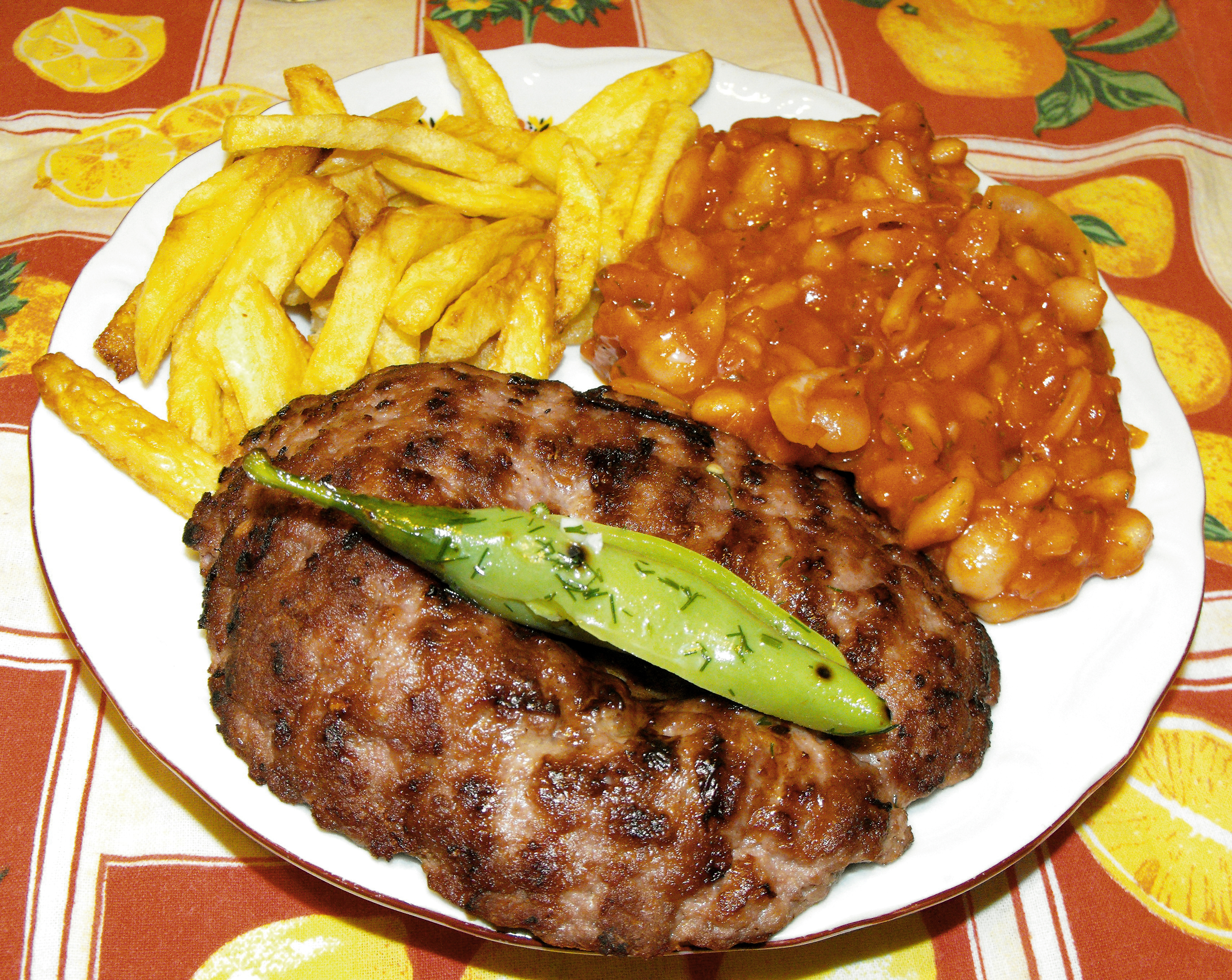
Pljeskavica with "sides" of French fries and baked beans

- Applesauce
- Asparagus
- Baked beans
- Baked potatoes
- Broccoli
- Cabbage
- Cauliflower
- Coleslaw
- Dinner rolls or other breads
- French fries or steak fries
- Green beans
- Greens
- Macaroni salad
- Macaroni and cheese
- Mashed potatoes
- Mushrooms
- Pasta salad
- Potato salad
- Salad (often a "side" salad)
- Sautéed mushrooms
- Squash
- Tater tots

== "On the side" ==
The related phrase on the side may be synonymous with "side dish" – as in "French fries on the side" – or may refer to a complimentary sauce or condiment served in a separate dish. For example, a diner may request a salad be served with its dressing "on the side".

== See also ==
- Banchan, Korean side dishes
- In a basket
- Platter (dinner)
