= Ispanaklı yumurta =

Turkish dish

- Course: Omelettes
- Place of origin: Turkey
- Created by: Ottoman cuisine
- Main ingredients: butter, eggs, fried onion and spinach.

Ispanaklı yumurta (Turkish: Ispanaklı yumurta), Ottoman and Turkish Jews (Kon espinaka) is a Turkish dish made with eggs, fried onion and spinach. Its recipe is given in the Ottoman Cookbook Aşçıbaşı written by Mahmud Nedim Bin Tosun.

== See also ==
- Nargesi Kebab
- Mirza-Qasemi
- Baghali ghatogh
- Scrambled eggs
- Omelette
