= Eggah =

Arab dish of eggs in a pancake

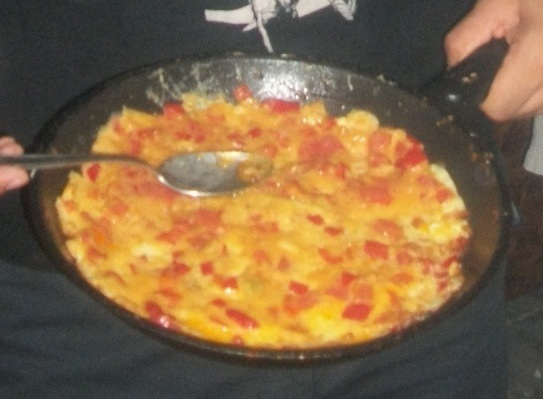
- Egyptian eggah
- Alternative names: Ijje
- Place of origin: Arab world
- Serving temperature: Hot or cold
- Main ingredients: Eggs, vegetables

Eggah, or ijeh (Arabic: عجة ʿijjah, Egyptian Arabic ʿegga) is an egg-based dish in Arab cuisine that is similar to a frittata or a French omelette, but firmer, as it uses eggs to bind fillings like meat and vegetables.

It comes in various forms and is prepared in various ways, in most varieties, the eggs are mixed with cream and with herbs and vegetables like parsley, mint, and leeks, as well as meats like ground beef or lamb. Cooking methods include oven baking (as a casserole) and skillet cooking (as single-person omelettes or latkes). It often utilizes vegetable leftovers.

Eggah is commonly seasoned with spices such as pepper, cinnamon, cumin, coriander seeds, turmeric, nutmeg and fresh herbs. It is usually circle-shaped and served sliced into rectangles or wedges, sometimes hot and sometimes cold. Eggah can be served as an appetizer, main course or side dish.

== History ==
The 10th-century Arabic cookbook by Abbasid author Ibn Sayyar al-Warraq contained a chapter titled في عمل العجيم المدوترات و المخلطات (making omelet discs), it contained several recipes for ujjas that were pan-fried or oven-baked, and used ingredients like green onions, mint, milk, and starch.

== Name ==
Ijjeh (Arabic: عجة, romanized: ʿujja) may also be spelled idjeh, ujja, or ijeh. Ijje is sometimes translated to English incorrectly as "omelette".

Eggah is often used in Egypt and the Maghreb region, while ijjeh/ijeh/ijje is more common in the Levant.

== Variations ==
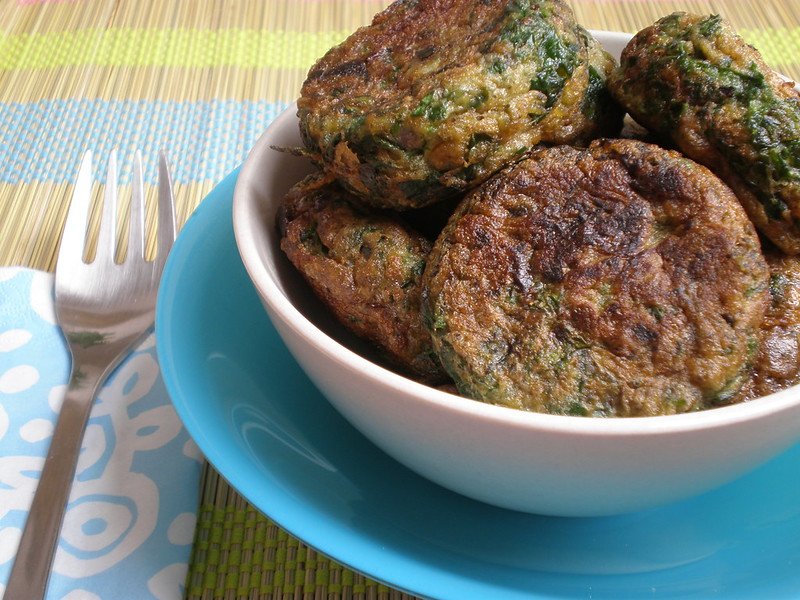
Sauteed ijjeh made with parsely, onions, eggs, and baharat

Variations of the eggah can include fillings such as; parsley, onion, tomato, bell pepper, and leek. Some versions, like Palestinian ones, may include flour and baking powder in their ijeh.

Tunisian ojja is often made with eggs, tomatoes, merguez sausages, and seafood.

One common Syrian variation is made into a disk with herb and vegetable filling and then pan fried. Similar ejjeh's are popular in Palestine.

== Comparison to similar foods ==
Eggah is often likened and compared to many other egg-based dishes, such as:

- Eggah is often called an omelette; although eggah is often firmer, heavier, and may be served cold.
- Persian kuku is can be considered to be an eggah, though core ingredients may vary slightly.
- Eggahs made with flour or bread crumbs are described to have a "pancake-like" texture.

== See also ==
- Arab cuisine – Culinary traditions of Arab people
- Egyptian cuisine
- Kuku – Egg-based Iranian dish, a similar Persian egg dish
- Murtabak – Stuffed pancake with various fillings
- Spanish omelette – Traditional dish of egg and potato
- List of egg dishes
