= Tortilla canaria =

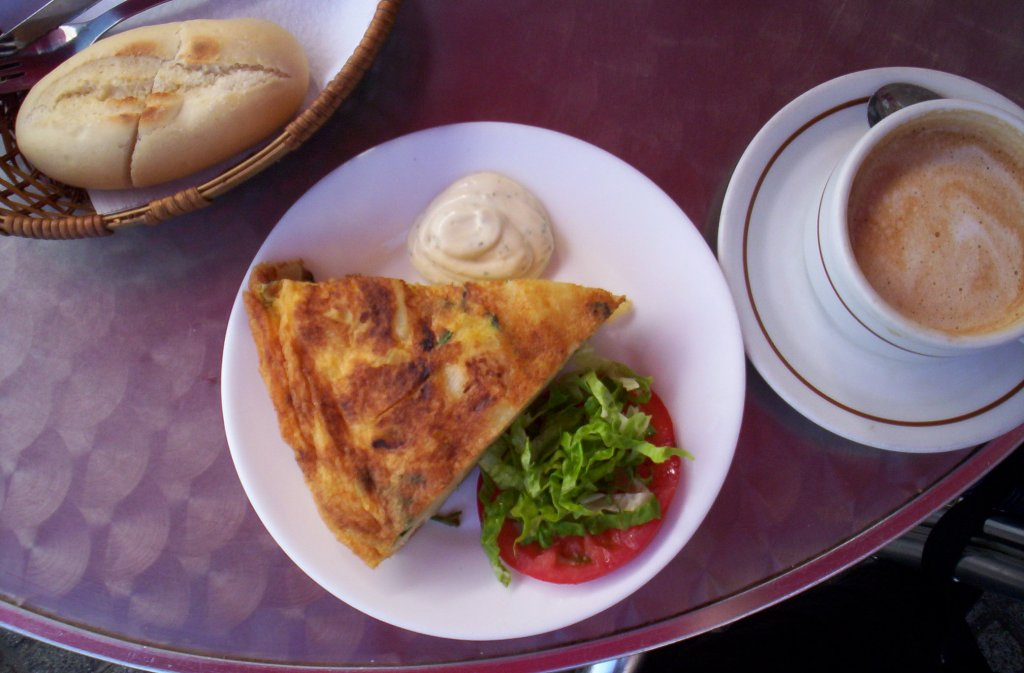
Tortilla canaria

The tortilla canaria (Spanish for Canary Islands omelette), is a dish that originated in Spain's Canary Islands, an island chain to the southwest of Spain and off the western coast of Africa.

Canary Islands cuisine fuses Spanish cooking traditions with those of Africa, Latin America and the Guanche people, the original inhabitants of the Canaries. Also, it utilizes local fish, fruits and vegetables.

The traditional recipe calls for an omelette filled with sautéed tomatoes, onions and garlic, seasoned with tarragon, parsley, salt and sometimes basil. Variations can include rice and a wide variety of vegetables.
