= Kuku (food) =

Egg-based Iranian dish

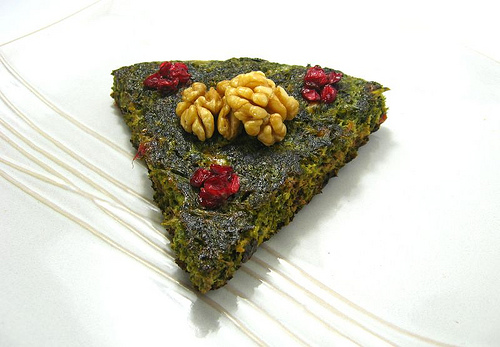
- Kuku sabzi (herb kuku) topped with barberries and walnuts
- Type: Omelette
- Course: Side dish, main course, or midday course
- Place of origin: Iran
- Associated cuisine: Iranian cuisine
- Main ingredients: Eggs
- Variations: Herb kuku, potato kuku, eggplant kuku
- Similar dishes: Frittata, Quiche, Eggah

Kuku or kookoo (Persian: کوکو) is an Iranian dish of beaten eggs with various ingredients folded in. It is similar to the Italian frittata, the French quiche, or an open-faced omelette, but it typically has less egg than a frittata, and is cooked for a shorter time, over a low heat, before being turned over or grilled briefly to set the top layer. It is served either hot or cold as a starter, side dish, or a main course, and is accompanied with bread and either yogurt or salad.

== History ==
Some authors consider kuku to be the earliest form of omelette. Cookbooks from the Safavid and Qajar periods in Persia (Iran) mention kuku. Qajar documents introduce it as a side dish.

Herb kuku (kuku sabzi), which is the most popular version, is served traditionally at Nowruz, the Iranian New Year's Day, symbolizing a fresh start, and also at Easter, as celebrated by Iranian Armenians and Iranian Georgians.

== Cooking methods ==
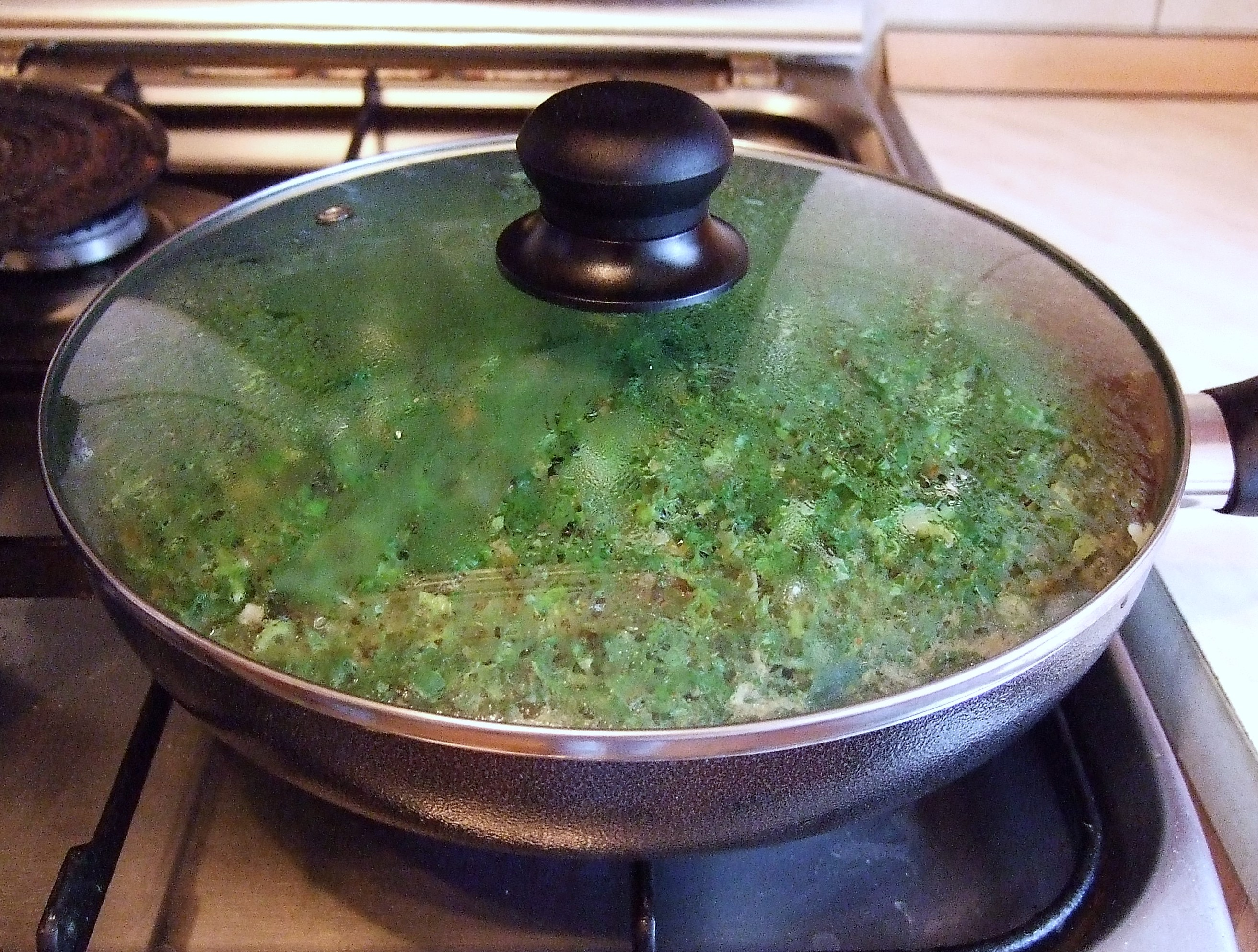
Cooking kuku sabzi (herb kuku) in a pan

Kuku is usually fried frying in oil on low heat and then covered to finish cooking. Baking is also popular. Extra thickness can be given using yeast. The result is a cake-like omelette that is usually served with bread, or possibly rice, particularly in the northern Iranian province of Gilan.

== Variations ==
Kuku is made with various ingredients and in a variety of styles, including herb kuku (kuku sabzi), potato kuku (kuku sibzamini), eggplant kuku (kuku-ye bādenjān, vereqā), roe kuku (ašbal kuku), and yogurt kuku (kuku-ye māst).

=== Herb kuku ===
Herb kuku (Persian: کوکو سبزی, lit. 'kuku sabzi'; Azerbaijani: göyərti küküsü, lit. 'green kuku'), is the most common type of kuku. It is made of eggs and herbs such as leeks and parsley. Garlic is very popular in the northern regions of Iran.

Another variation is walnut and herb kuku (Persian: gerdu kuku; Azerbaijani: qozlu kükü); the addition of nuts changes the texture.

=== Cauliflower kuku ===
Cauliflower kuku (kuku-ye gol-e-kalam) features caramelized onions and cauliflower. Najmieh Batmanglij's cookbook, Food of Life (1986) featured a version of it.

=== Potato kuku ===
Potato kuku, kuku sibzamini, is made of eggs, potatoes, spices like saffron or turmeric, and other ingredients. It has been compared to the Spanish omelette (a potato tortilla), and to latkes.

=== Eggplant kuku ===
Eggplant kuku, kuku-ye bādenjān in Persian, is made of mashed eggplant and eggs, together with parsley, walnuts, onions, and barberries.

=== Roe kuku ===
Roe kuku, known as ašbal kuku or ašbol kuku in Gilaki, is a variant of kuku in Gilan that includes roe (caviar).

== See also ==
- Egg bhurji
- Eggah, a similar Arab dish
- List of egg dishes
- Shakshouka
- Tunisian tajine, a similar Tunisian dish
