= Crespéou =

Savory Provençal cake

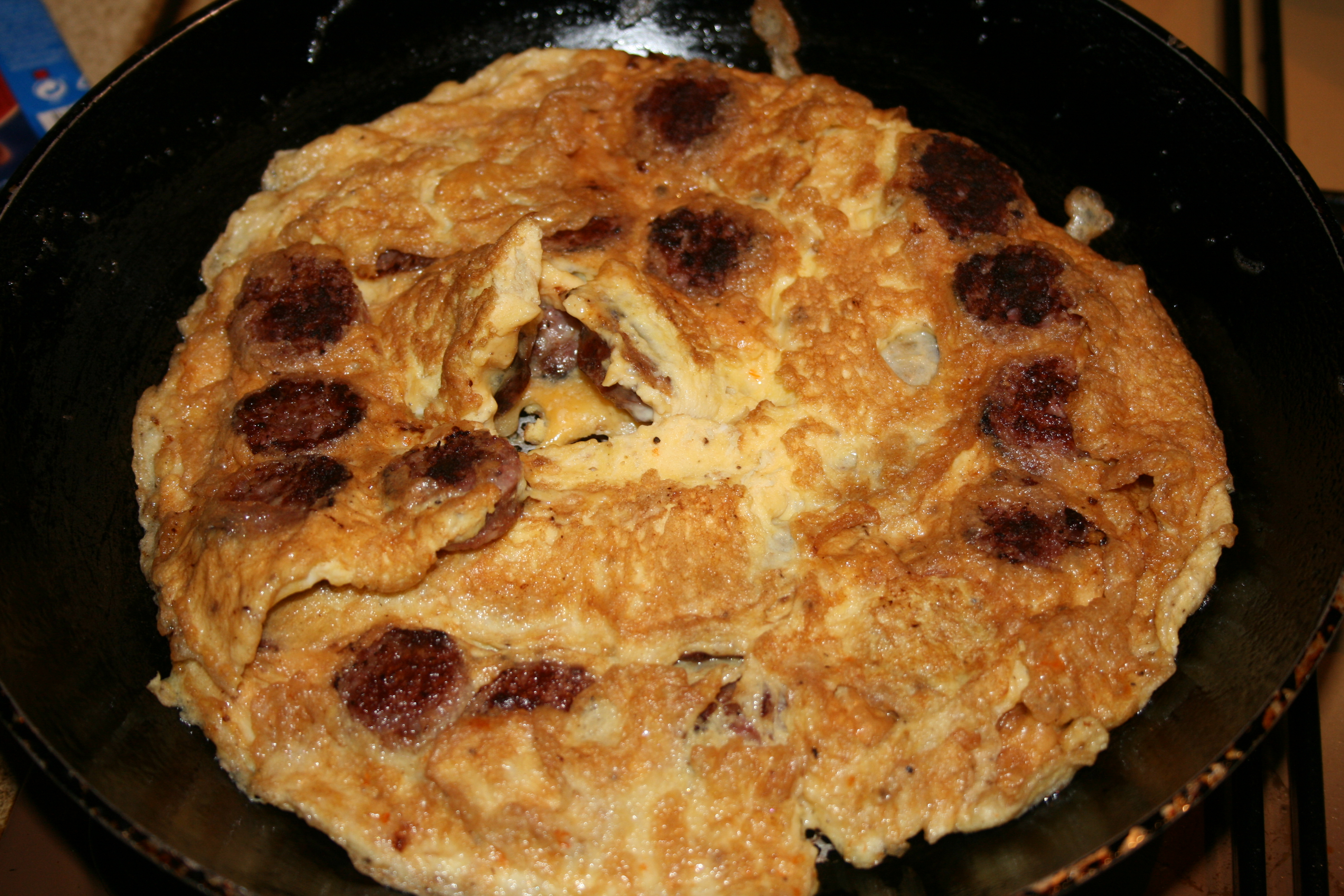
- Crespéou of Piolenc
- Alternative names: trouchia; omelette à la moissonneuse
- Course: Main
- Place of origin: France
- Region or state: Avignon and Comtat Venaissin
- Serving temperature: Cold
- Main ingredients: Eggs, various flavoring vegetables

A crespéou (French: [kʁɛs.pe.u]) is a savory Provençal cake made up of omelettes with herbs and vegetables stacked in layers. The dish can be eaten cold, sometimes accompanied with a tomato coulis. The recipe, which appears to be native of Avignon and Haut-Vaucluse (Piolenc and Orange), has become popular throughout the county of Venaissin, the region of Provence, and the countryside around Nice.

== Origin ==
Its name comes from crespèu, the Occitan form of the French word crêpe. Similarly to a fougasse, an Occitan crespèu has many variations. This dish is also known as trouchia or omelette à la moissonneuse. The latter name suggests that it originated as a dish traditionally prepared for field work and specifically for the harvest season.

== Flavors and colors ==
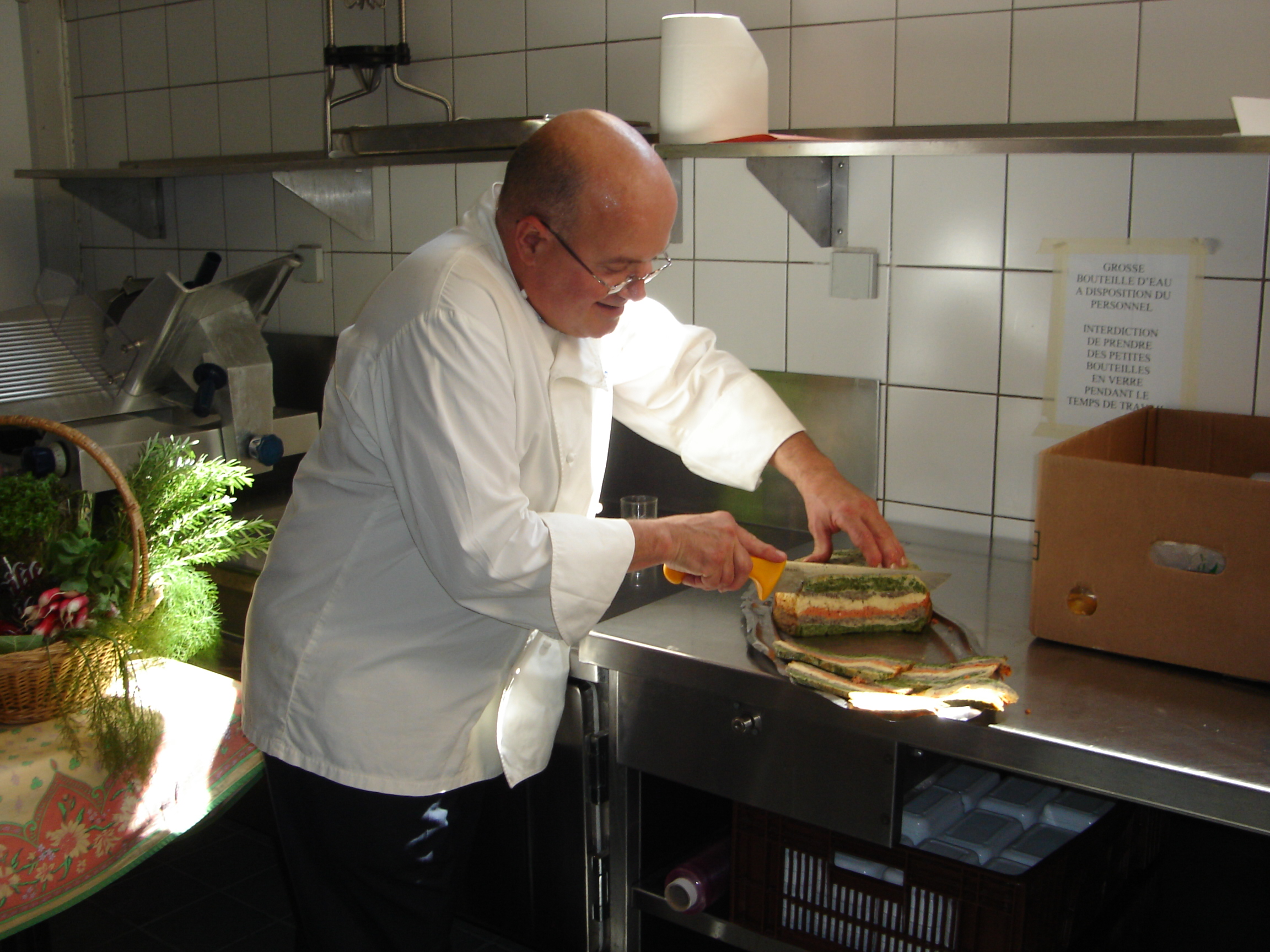
Cutting a crespéou in a restaurant in Avignon

The dish is usually baked and inverted. It comprises a minimum of three or four layers of different colored omelettes, often given by red tomatoes, orange carrots, green spinach or chard, and black olives. Peppers, with their variety of colors also allows for multicolored crespéou. Some preparations use sausage or sliced fish for a beige layer. In Nice, there is always an omelette made from chard ribs. Other vegetables can be used, such as zucchini, eggplant, onion, or basil.

== Matching food and wine ==
Traditionally a crespéou does not have to be accompanied by a wine. However, given the dish's extremely identified [pronounced?] flavors, it can pair with a rosé wine certified to originate (AOC) from Côtes du Roussillon or Coteaux d'Aix-en-Provence.

== Gallery ==
Various crespéou

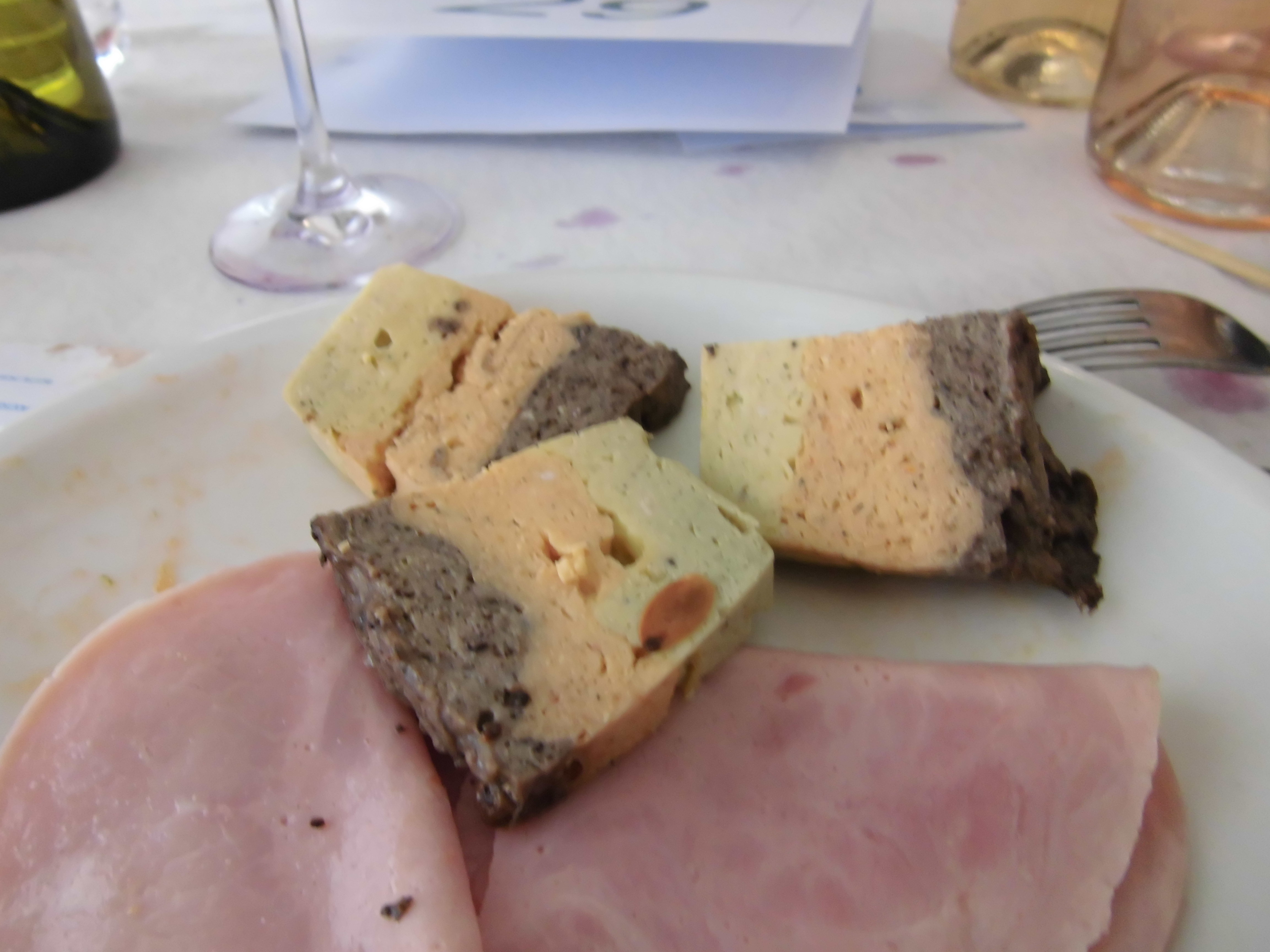

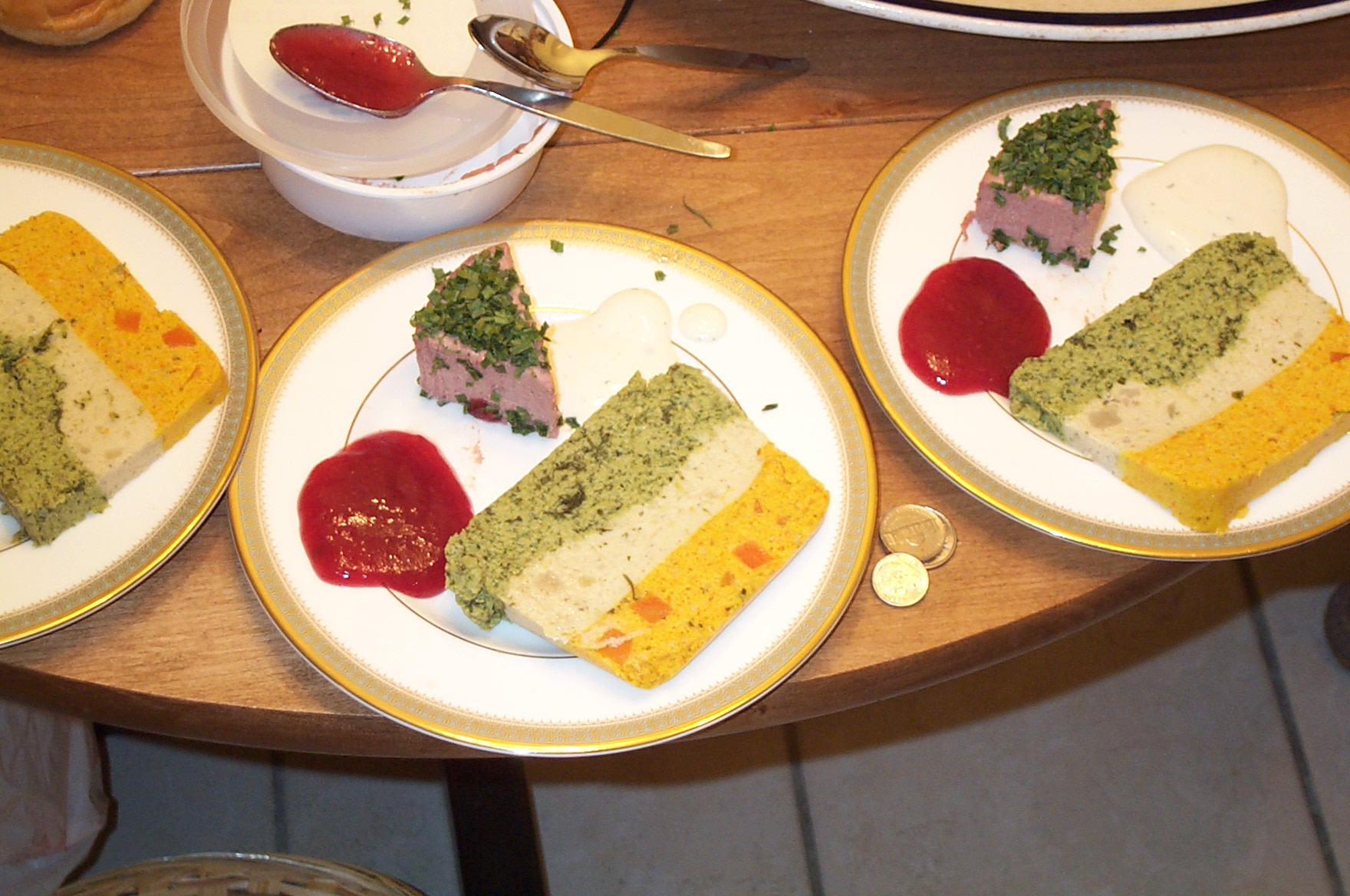

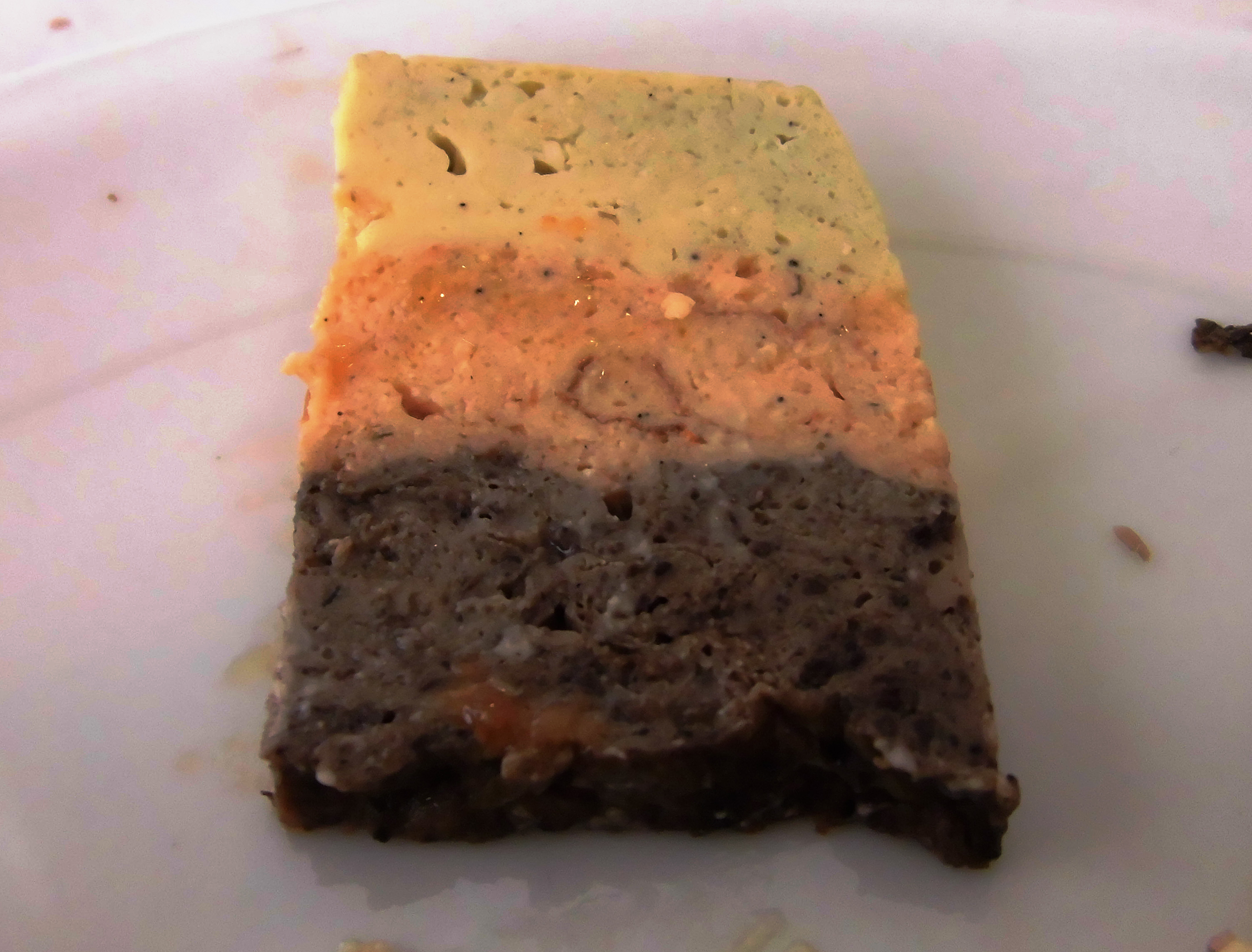

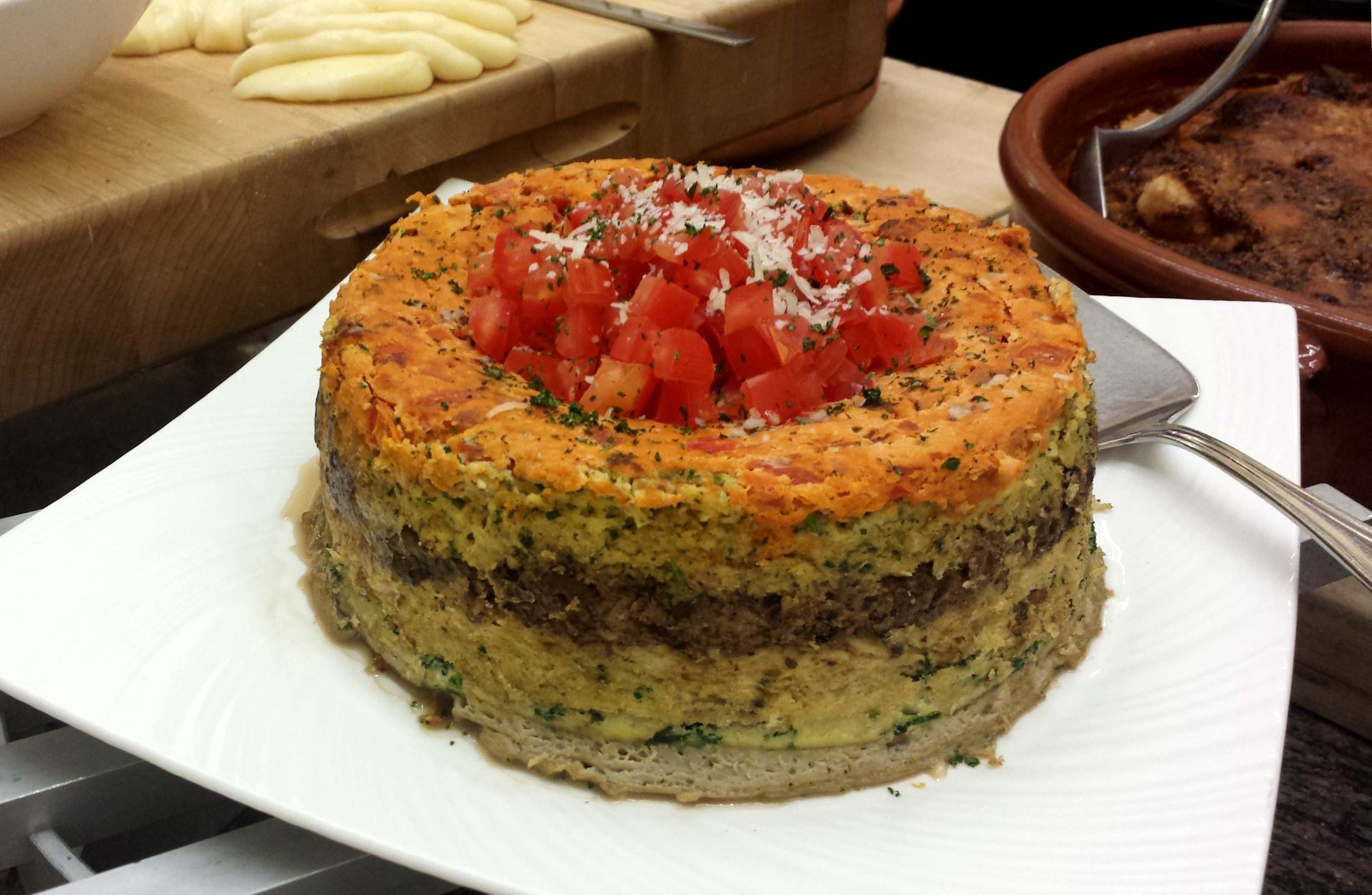

== See also ==
- Frittata
