= Nargesi (food) =

Iranian spinach omelette

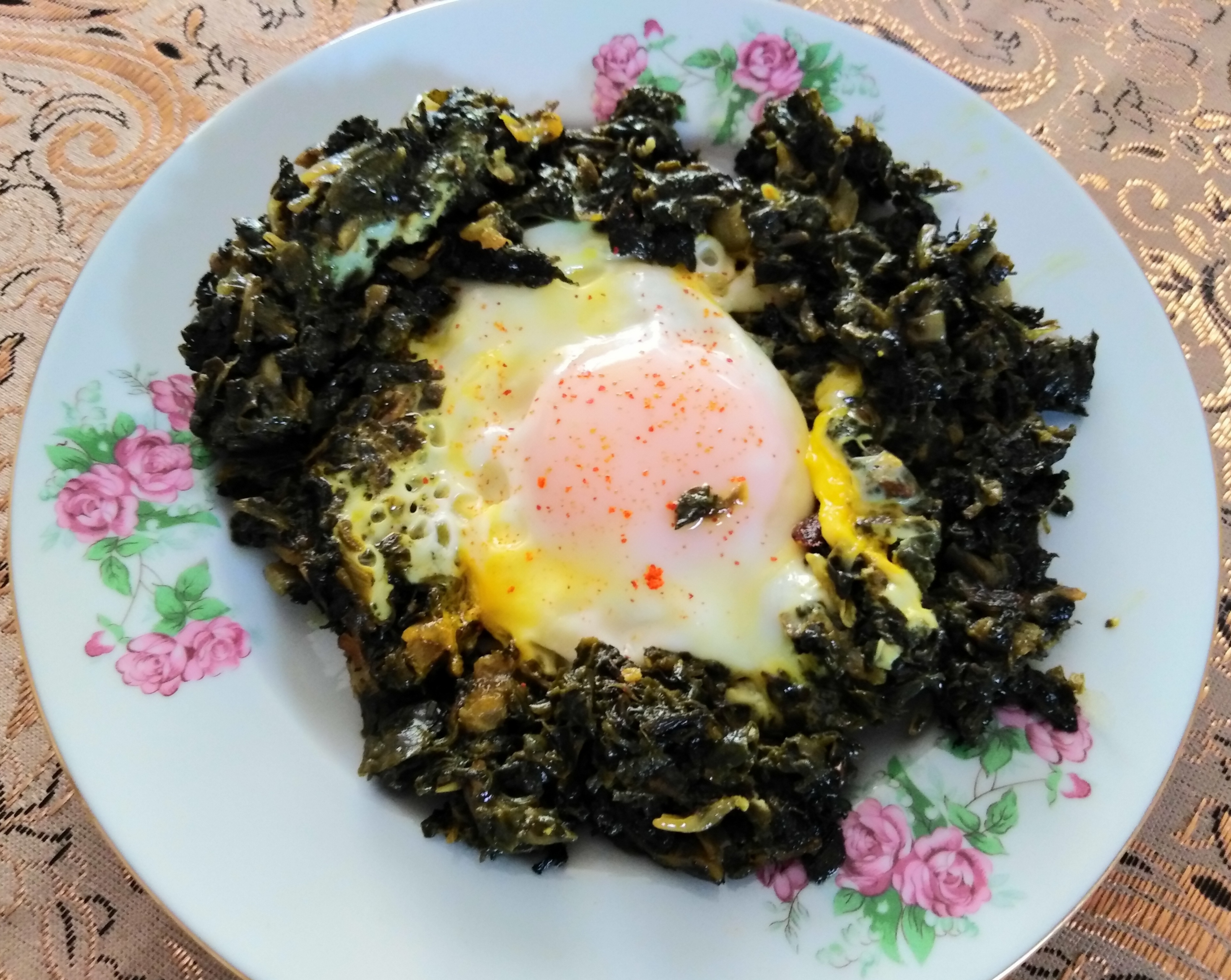
- Alternative names: نرگسی
- Place of origin: Iran

Nargesi (Persian: نرگسی) is an Iranian dish made with eggs, fried onion and spinach. It is spiced with salt, garlic, and pepper. Its name, narges, means 'narcissus flower'. It is a type of spinach omelette frequently eaten for breakfast.

== History ==
According to historian Daniel Newman, a related dish called narjisiyya (Arabic: نرجسية) can be found in a 13th-century Andalusian cookbook, although it is unclear which dish predates the other. Older recipes for narjisiyya can be found in a 10th-century book by Ibn Sayyar al-Warraq, who described a dish made with sunny-side-up eggs.

== See also ==
- Baghali ghatogh
- Mirza ghassemi
- Nargesi kebab
- Omelette
- Scrambled eggs
