= Baghali ghatogh =

Northern Iranian dish made with fava beans, dill, and eggs

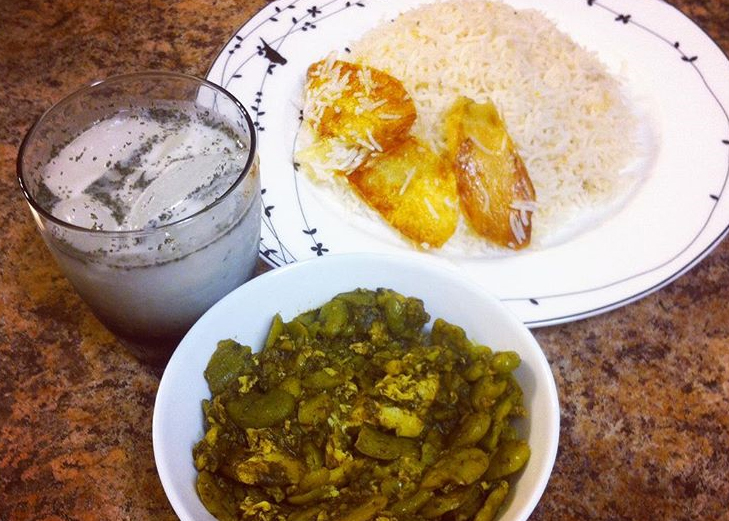
- Alternative names: Baghala ghatogh
- Type: Stew
- Course: Main course
- Place of origin: Iran
- Region or state: Iran (Northern Iran)
- Created by: Gilaks
- Main ingredients: Dill, broad bean, garlic, advieh

Baghali ghatogh (Persian: باقالی قاتق) is a northern Iranian dish made with pach-baqala, a local bean type resembling Italian borlotti beans. Other ingredients are dill, eggs, turmeric, and garlic. It is usually served with kateh (Iranian steamed rice) in northern provinces such as Gilan. This dish per definition can be considered a khoresh (Persian for 'stew') but despite khoreshes typically containing meat, it is a vegetarian food.

Outside of Gilan, this dish is made with other large or flat beans such as lima beans, kidney beans or fava beans, depending on availability.

== See also ==
- Caspian cuisine
- Nargesi
