= Nargesi kebab =

South Asian meat and egg dish

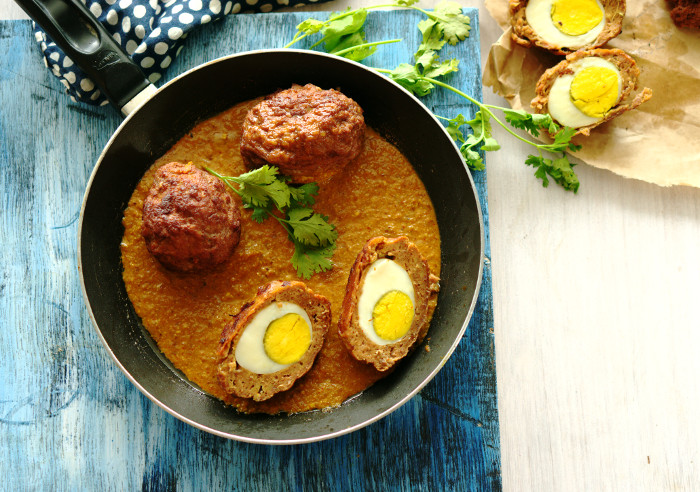
- Nargisi kofta in a frying pan with curry sauce
- Place of origin: Afghanistan, Pakistani and India
- Region or state: Middle East
- Main ingredients: ground meat, herbs, spices, egg

Nargesi kebab, Nargesi kofta or Narges shami kebab is an Afghan, Middle Eastern, Pakistani and Indian dish. It can be described as a kebab or kofta with a chicken egg in the middle. It is named after the narcissus flower because kebabs look like the flower's petals when they are cut. It is akin to koofteh Tabrizi, comparably consisting of a mixture of ground meat, herbs, and spices wrapped around a boiled egg.

== See also ==
- Nargesi (food)
- Tabriz meatballs
- Scotch egg
