= Omelette =

Egg dish

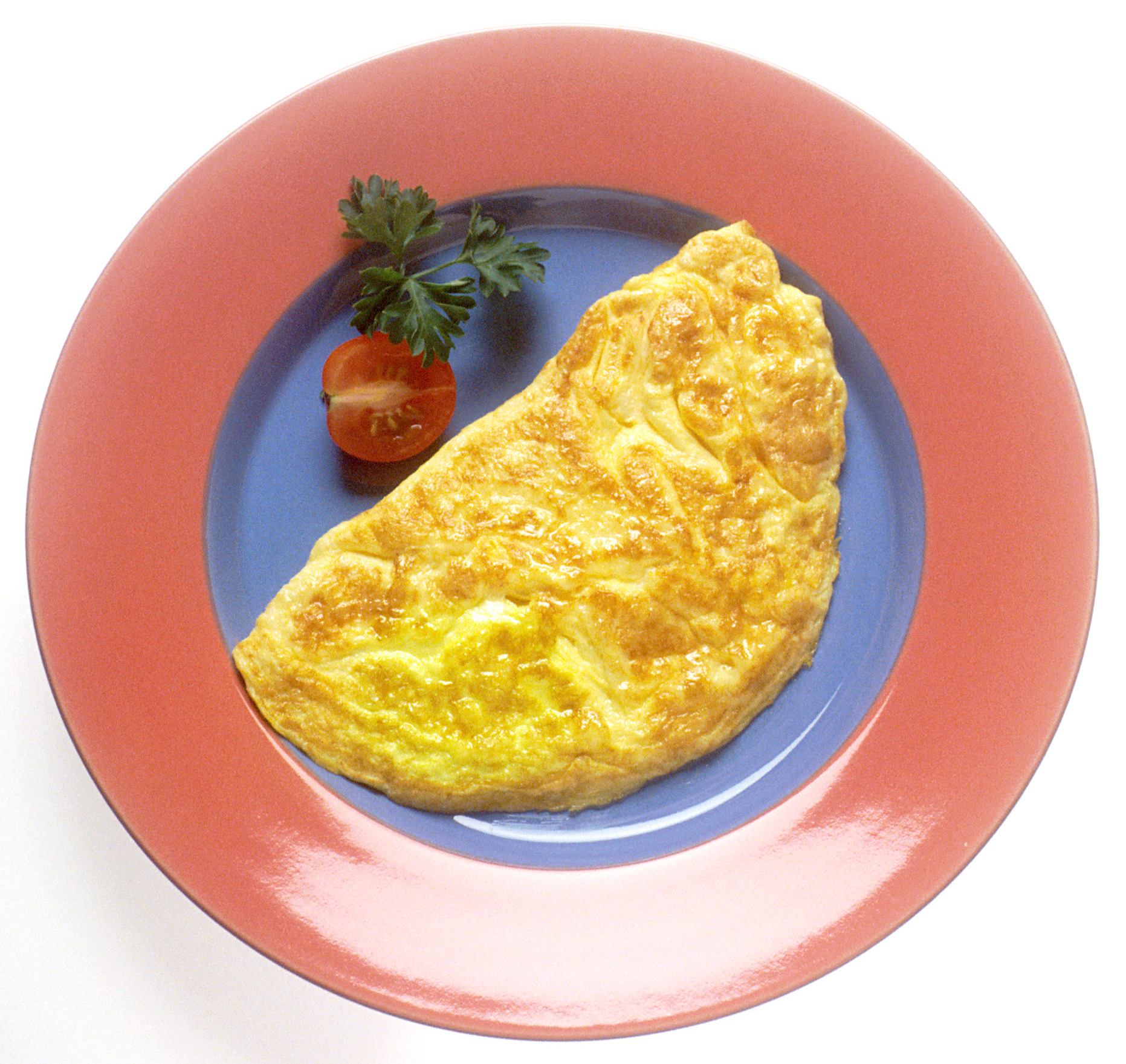
- Plain omelette
- Alternative names: Omelet, egg pancake
- Serving temperature: Hot
- Main ingredients: Eggs, butter or oil
- Similar dishes: kuku, eggah, frittata, Spanish tortilla

An omelette (omelet in American English; see spelling differences) is a dish made from beaten eggs (usually chicken eggs) fried with butter or oil. Unlike scrambled eggs, they are cooked undisturbed so that they set into a continuous disk. In Europe, omelettes are often folded around a filling such as herbs, cheese, alliums, cured meats (such as bacon and ham), mushrooms, other vegetables, and smoked salmon. Some flavorings, notably herbs and alliums, may be mixed into the beaten eggs before cooking.

Sweet omelettes were formerly popular, filled with liquors, fruits, or fruit preserves.

== History ==
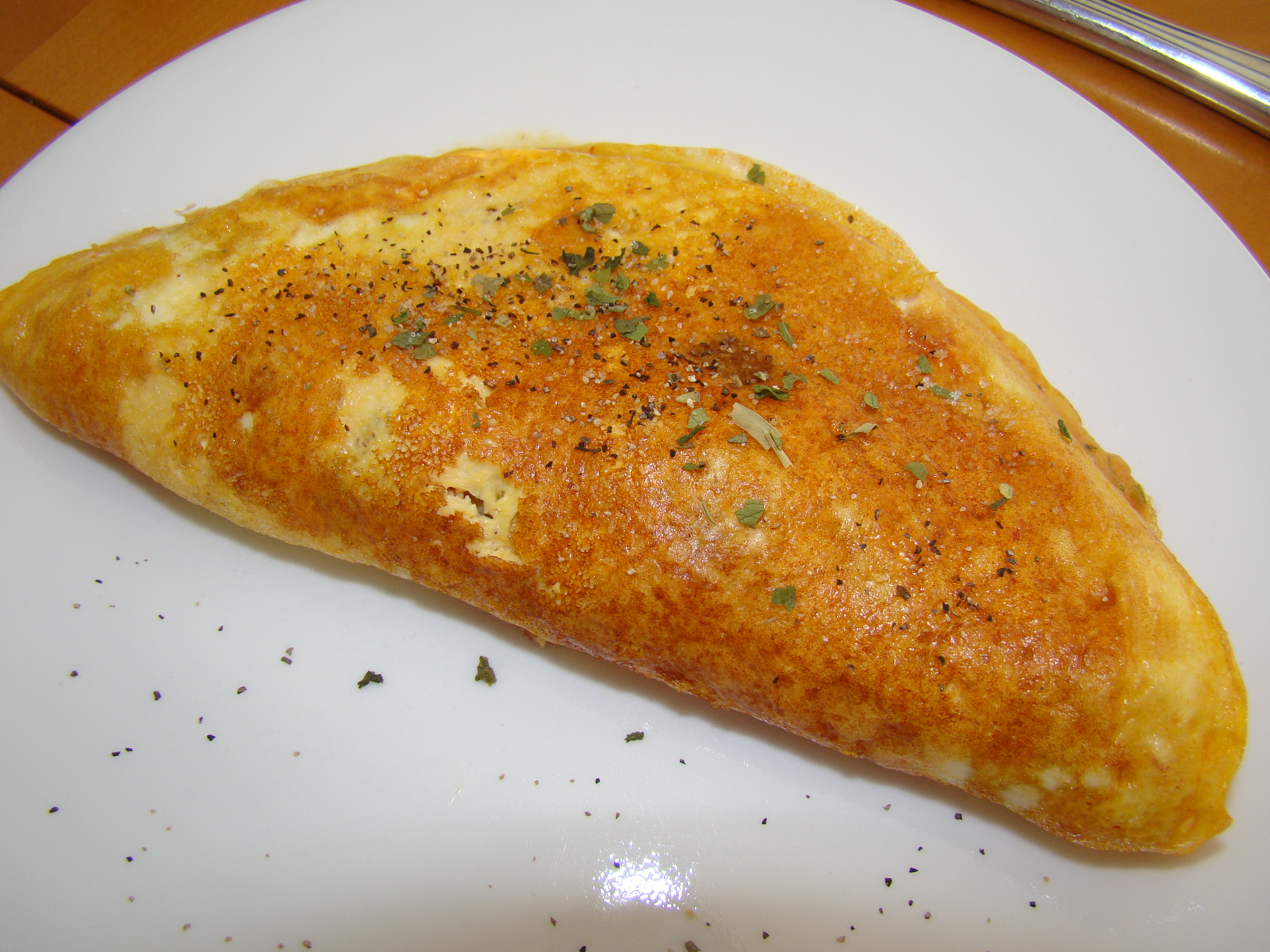
Browned omelette with herbs

Omelettes may have originated in ancient Persia; they are "nearly indistinguishable" from the Iranian dish kookoo sabzi.

The French word omelette (French: [ɔm.lɛt]) came into use during the mid-16th century, but the versions alumelle and alumete are employed by the Ménagier de Paris (II, 4 and II, 5) in 1393. Rabelais (Gargantua and Pantagruel, IV, 9) mentions an homelaicte d'oeufs, Olivier de Serres an amelette, La Varenne's Le cuisinier françois (1651) has aumelette, and the modern omelette appears in Cuisine bourgeoise (1784).

Alexandre Dumas discusses several variations of omelette in his Grand dictionnaire de cuisine. One is an omelette with fresh herbs (parsley, chives and tarragon), and another is a variation with mushrooms that Dumas says may be adapted using green peas, asparagus, spinach, sorrel or varieties of truffles. The "kirsch omelette" (or rum omelette) is a sweet omelette made with sugar and liquor, either kirsch or rum. The omelette is rolled and sprinkled with powdered sugar. A hot poker is used to burn a design into the omelette and it is served with a sweet sauce made of liquor and apricot jam. Another sweet omelette, attributed to a royal cook of Prussia, is made with apples and brown sugar glaze. Of the Arabian omelette, Dumas writes, "I have been concerned in this book to give the recipes of peoples who have no true cuisine. Here, for example, is a recipe the Bey's cook was good enough to give me." The omelette itself is made with an ostrich egg and served with a spicy tomato-pepper sauce.

== Variations by country ==
Omelette, plain
Nutritional value per 100 g (3.5 oz)
- Energy: 657 kJ (157 kcal)
- Carbohydrates: 0.7 g
- Fat: 12 g
- Protein: 10.6 g
Vitamins and minerals
Vitamins	Quantity %DV^{†}
Vitamin A equiv.	19% 172 μg
Thiamine (B1)	8% 0.1 mg
Riboflavin (B2)	31% 0.4 mg
Niacin (B3)	1% 0.1 mg
Pantothenic acid (B5)	24% 1.2 mg
Vitamin B6	6% 0.1 mg
Folate (B9)	10% 39 μg
Vitamin B12	46% 1.1 μg
Choline	39% 212 mg
Vitamin D	4% 29 IU
Vitamin E	8% 1.2 mg
Vitamin K	4% 4.5 μg
Minerals	Quantity %DV^{†}
Calcium	4% 47 mg
Iron	8% 1.5 mg
Magnesium	2% 10 mg
Phosphorus	13% 162 mg
Potassium	4% 114 mg
Selenium	49% 26.7 μg
Sodium	7% 161 mg
Zinc	8% 0.9 mg
- Other constituents: Quantity
- Water: 75.9 g
- Cholesterol: 356 mg
- Link to USDA Database entry
- ^{†}Percentages estimated using US recommendations for adults, except for potassium, which is estimated based on expert recommendation from the National Academies.

=== Arab cuisine ===
- Eggah or ʻijjah is a sort of omelette or frittata in Arab cuisine, especially Egyptian cuisine.

=== China ===
- Egg foo young, a Cantonese omelette made with beaten eggs and usually ham.
- An oyster omelette, a dish of Hokkien and Teochew origin made with oysters, starch and egg batter.
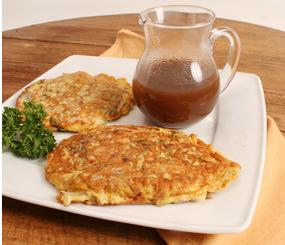
Egg foo young

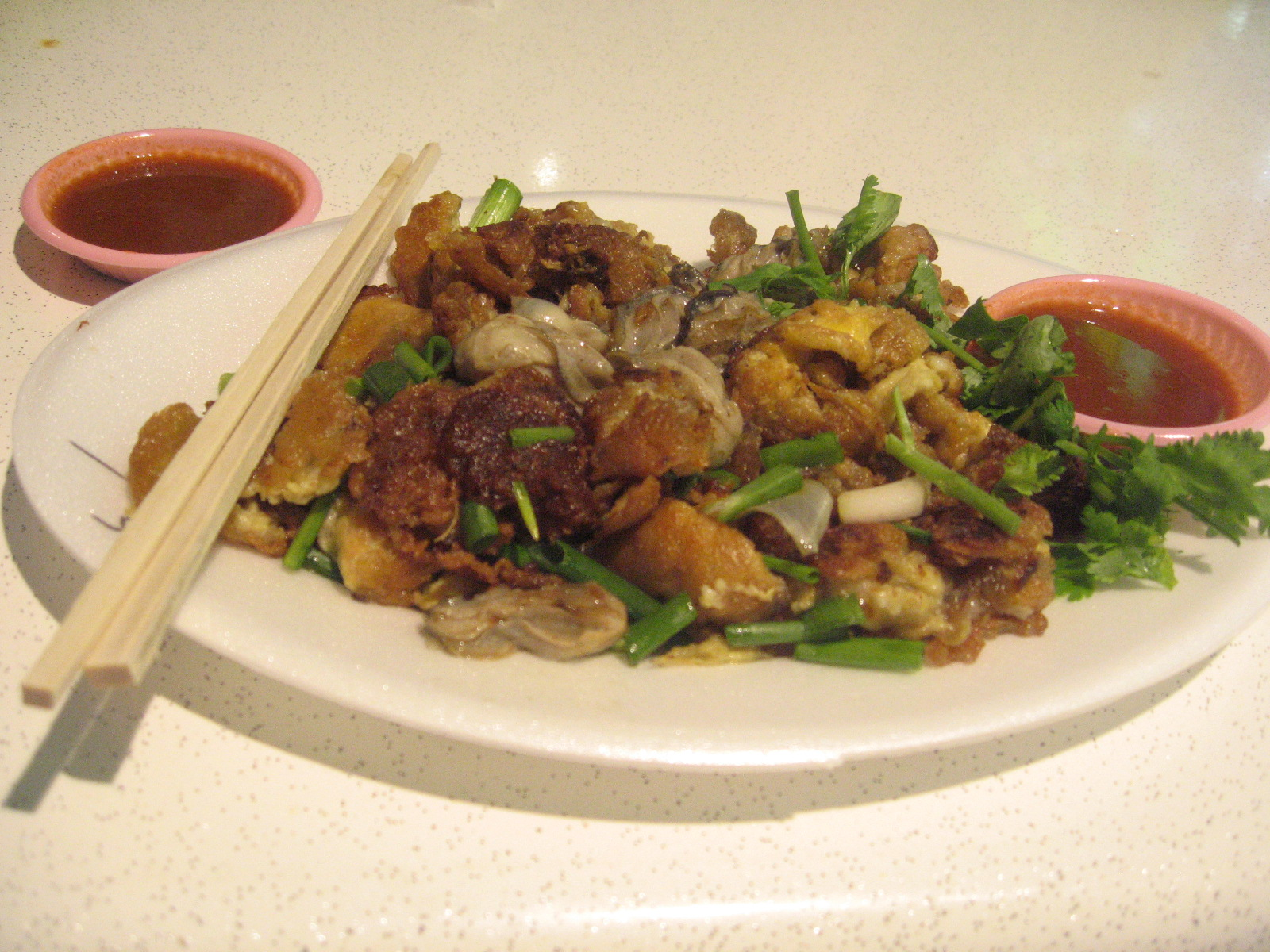
Oyster omelette

=== France ===
- Recipes for French omelettes vary. They are generally cooked in butter. The pan temperature may be moderate or hot; their color may be golden brown or "unbrowned or very lightly browned" on the outside and soft in the inside (though variations are possible according to preference); according to some American cookbooks reflecting high-end restaurant practices, a "French Omelette" should be unbrowned, cooked slowly over medium-low to medium heat, with initial stirring to prevent curds and sticking. Seasoned with just salt and pepper, this omelette is often flavored with finely chopped herbs (often fines herbes or tarragon, chervil, parsley and chives) or chopped onions.
- The omelette de la mère Poulard, a Norman specialty using frothy beaten eggs and developed at Mont-Saint-Michel, has been called the most famous omelette in the world. It is served without fillings but often served with heavy garnishes.
- The Provençal omelette is more similar to a frittata than to a traditional rolled or folded French omelette. The eggs are cooked like a traditional French omelette until the time any fillings are added; instead of adding fillings in a strip or on half the omelette, they are scattered over the entire surface of the omelette, and then the entire omelette is flipped and slipped back into the pan to cook what had been the top and is now the bottom. A tourne omelette or vire omelette, a concave platter similar to a cake plate, is often used as an aid and can be used to serve the finished omelette. According to Bernard Duplessy the tourne omelette dates to "several centuries before Christ".
- Crespéou, another Provençal dish (also called gâteau d'omelettes or omelettes en sandwich), is made by stacking open-faced omelettes.
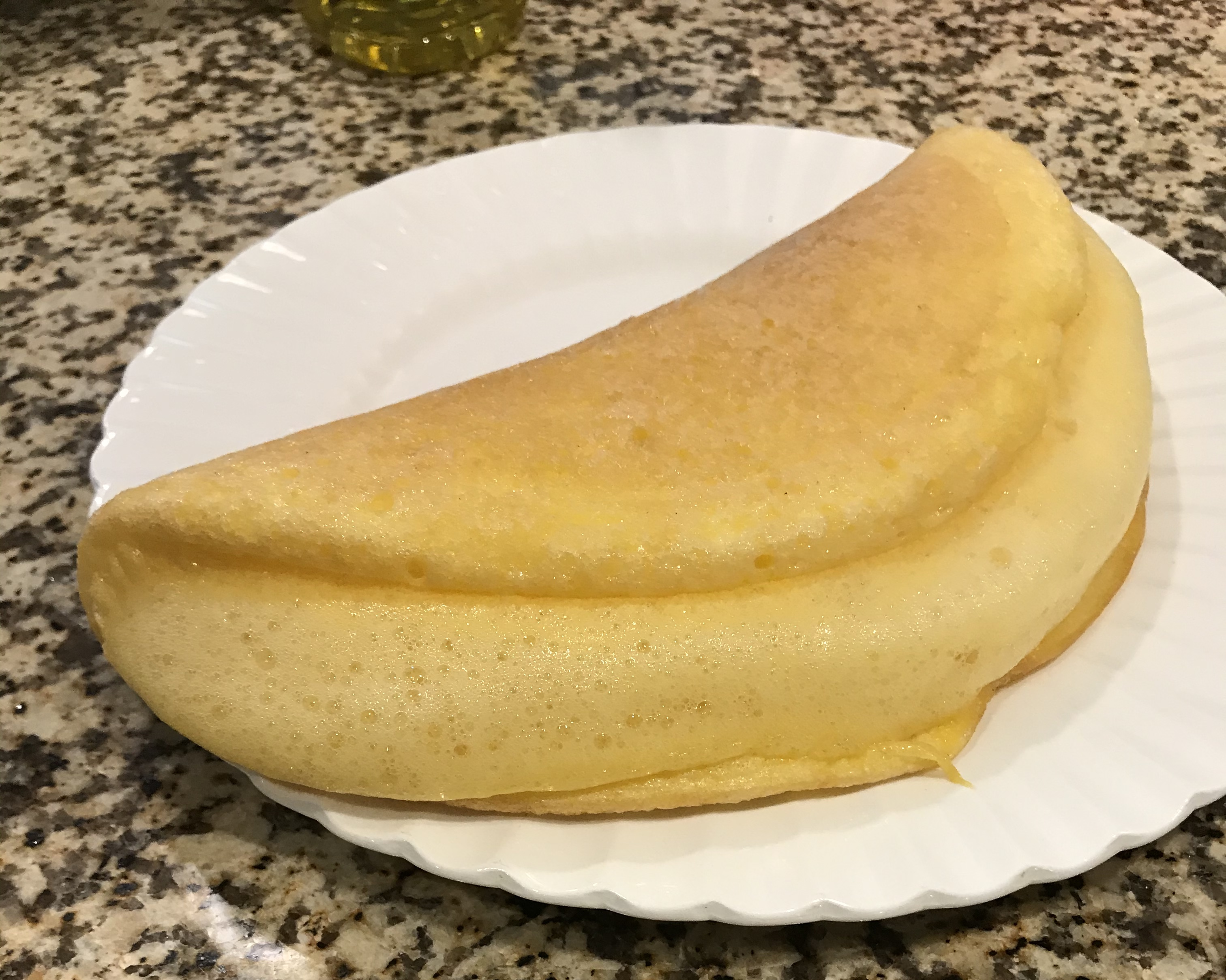
Omelette de la mère Poulard

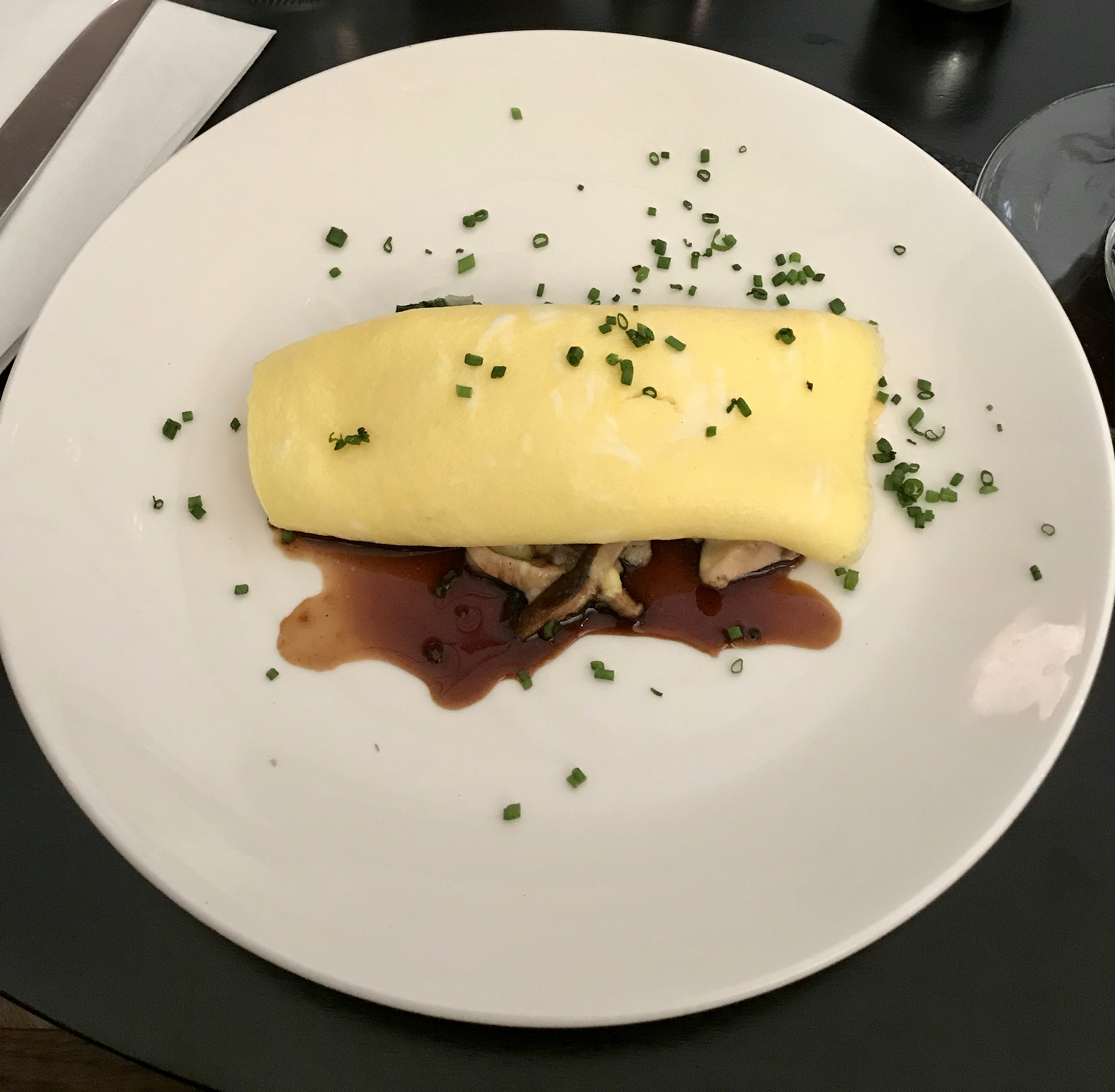
Blond unbrowned omelet with mushrooms and herbs

=== Germany ===
- Bauernfrühstück 'farmer's breakfast' is an omelette filled with potatoes, diced speck, onions, and chives, and often forest mushrooms.
- Kaiserschmarrn is a sort of sweet pancake sometimes considered to be a kind of omelette.

=== India ===
- In Parsi cuisine, pora is an omelette made from eggs, onion, tomato, green chillies, and coriander leaves. It is usually served for breakfast with Indian/Irani tea and bread.
- In India, eggs are beaten with onions and poured directly on a hot pan with salt and pepper. These omelettes are consumed frequently in many Indian households.
- Bread Omelette is a snack made with bread and egg that is widespread across India.
- In South Indian hotels, omelettes may be mixed with mutton gravy (salna) in a semi-cooked manner, and many omelette variants like kalakki, plain omelettes, Karandi omelettes, and Podi omelettes are found in Tamil Nadu.

=== Indonesia ===
- In Betawi cuisine, kerak telor is a traditional spicy omelette that made from glutinous rice cooked with egg and served with serundeng (fried shredded coconut), fried shallots and dried shrimp as topping.
- Fuyunghai or puyonghai is a Chinese Indonesian omelette, usually made from the mixture of vegetables such as carrots, bean sprouts, and cabbages, mixed with meats such as crab, shrimp, or minced chicken.
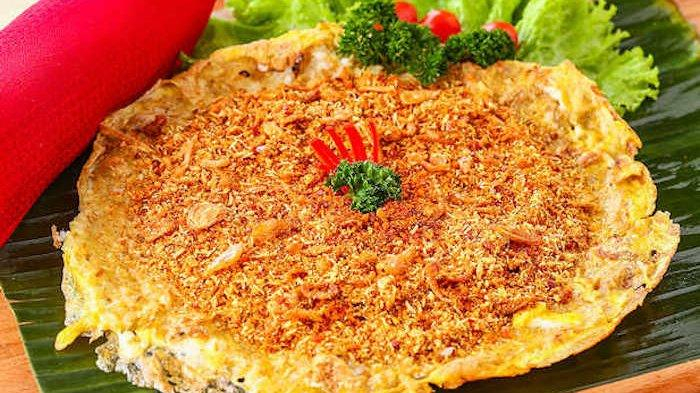
Kerak telor

=== Iran ===
- Iranian omelette is an omelette differing from its European counterpart in that it contains tomatoes, tomato paste and frequently other ingredients such as fried onions.
- Kuku is an omelette frequently containing large proportions of other ingredients, including herbs, folded in.
- Nargesi or spinach omelette is an Iranian dish, made with fried onions and spinach, and is spiced with salt, garlic, and pepper.
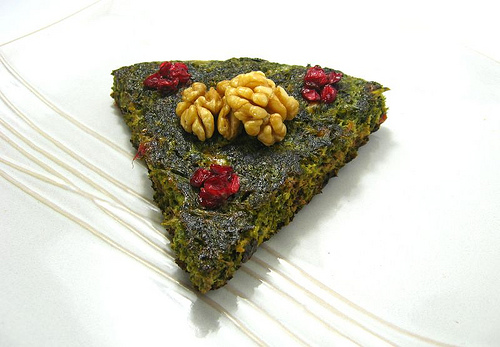
Kuku

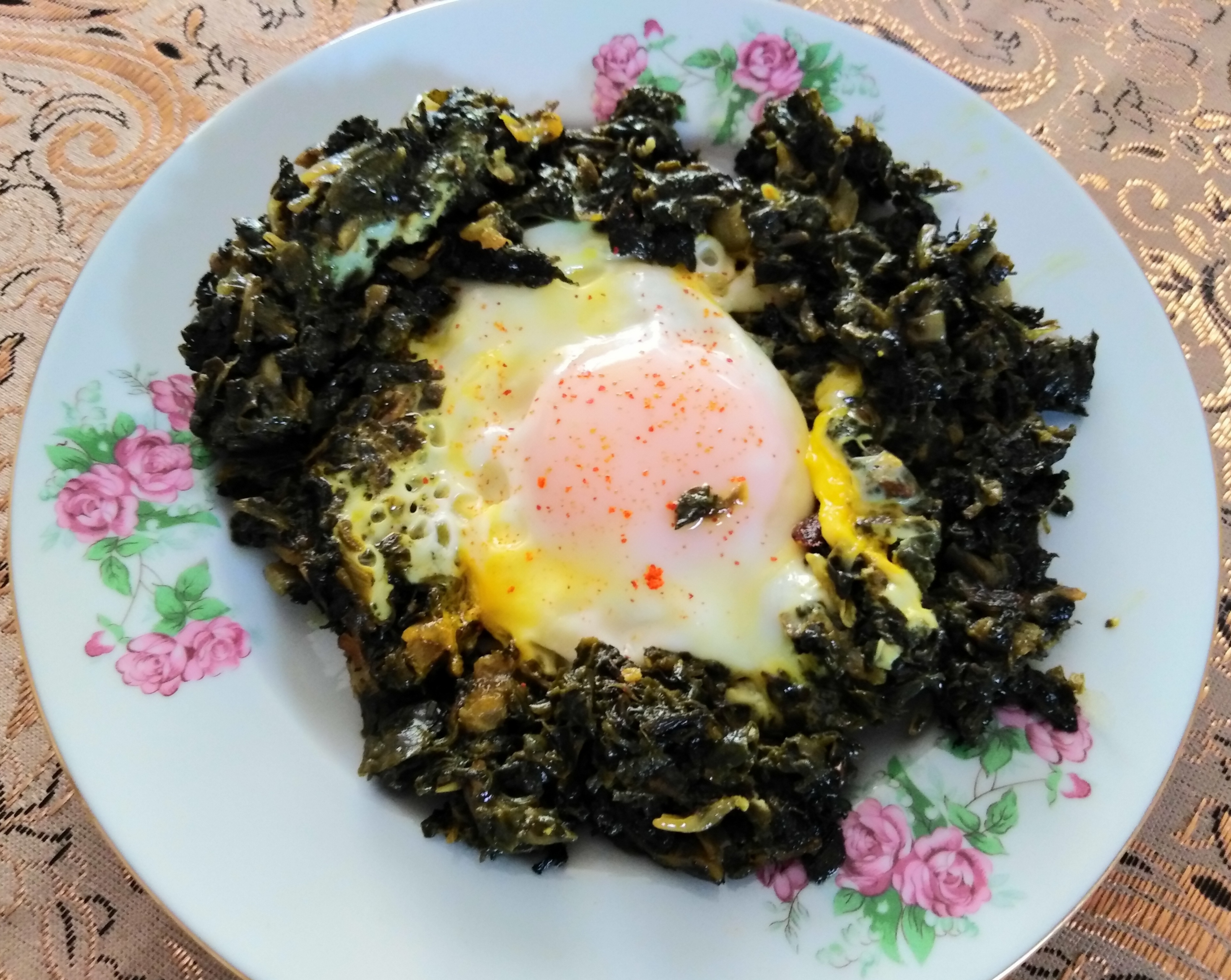
Nargesi

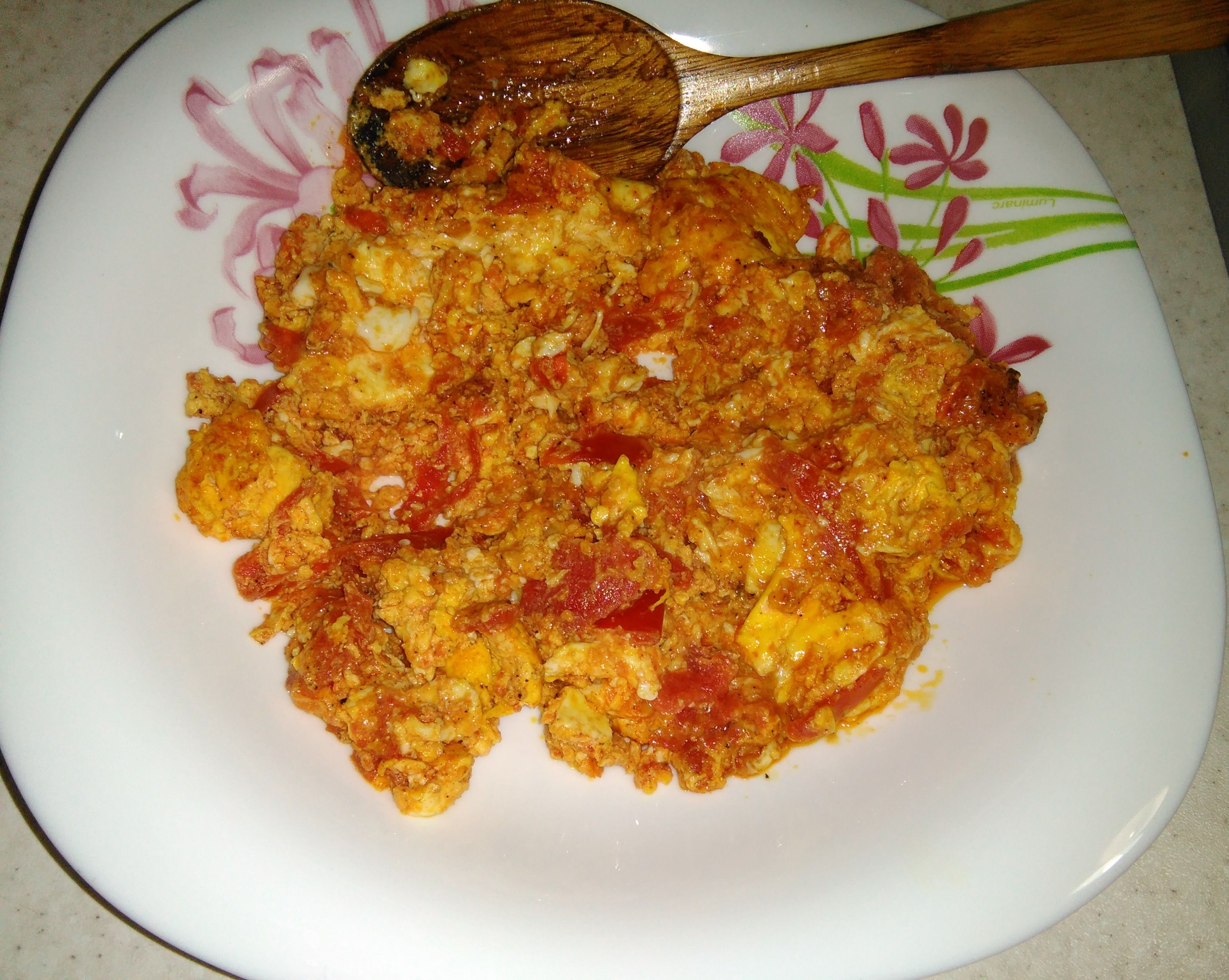
Iranian omelette with tomato

=== Italy ===
- A frittata is an open-faced Italian omelette-like dish that can contain cheese, vegetables, or even leftover pasta. Frittatas are cooked slowly. Except for the cooking oil, all ingredients are fully mixed with the eggs before cooking starts.
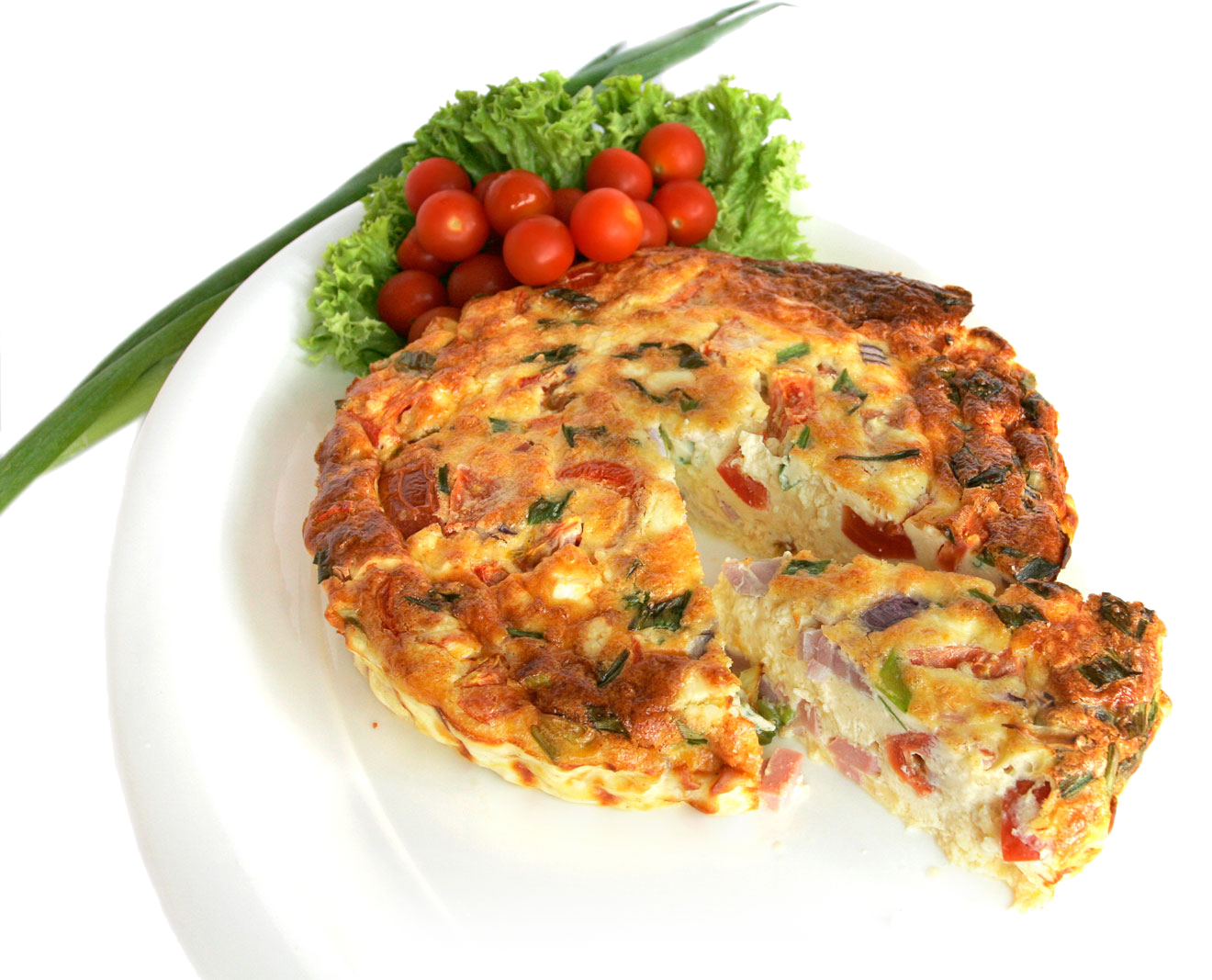
Frittata

=== Japan ===
- In Japan, tamagoyaki is a traditional omelette in which eggs are beaten with mirin, soy sauce, bonito flakes, sugar and water, and cooked in a special rectangular frying pan.
- Omurice (from the French word "omelette" and English word "rice") is an omelette filled with fried rice and usually served with a large amount of tomato ketchup. Omu-soba is an omelette with yakisoba as its filling. There are several styles of this dish, including omelette cooked and filled with fried rice, a soft-cooked omelette served over the fried rice that is then sliced open, and a "tornado" style omelette over the rice.
- Tenshindon is a Japanese-Chinese specialty, consisting of a crab meat omelette on rice.
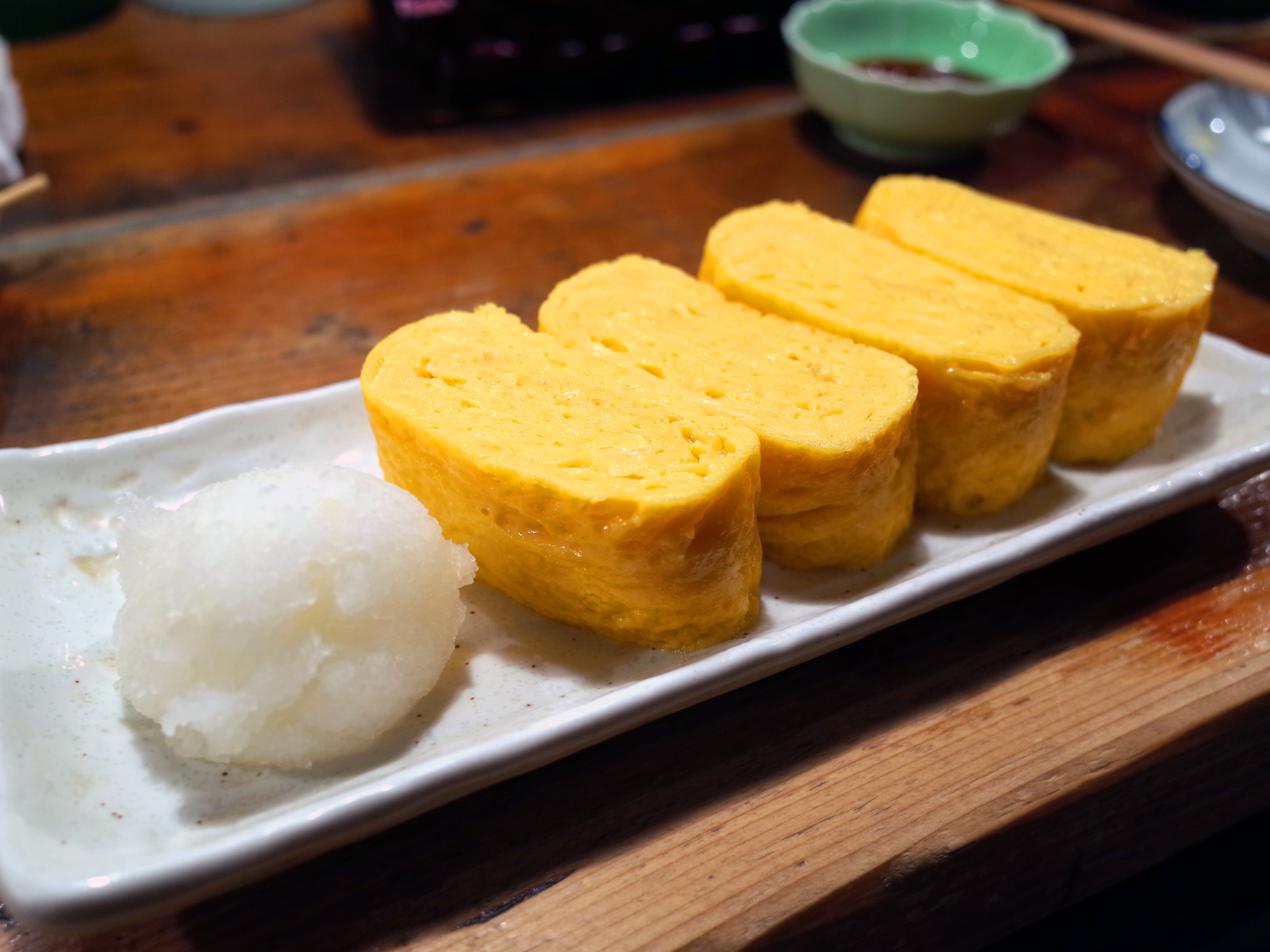
Tamagoyaki

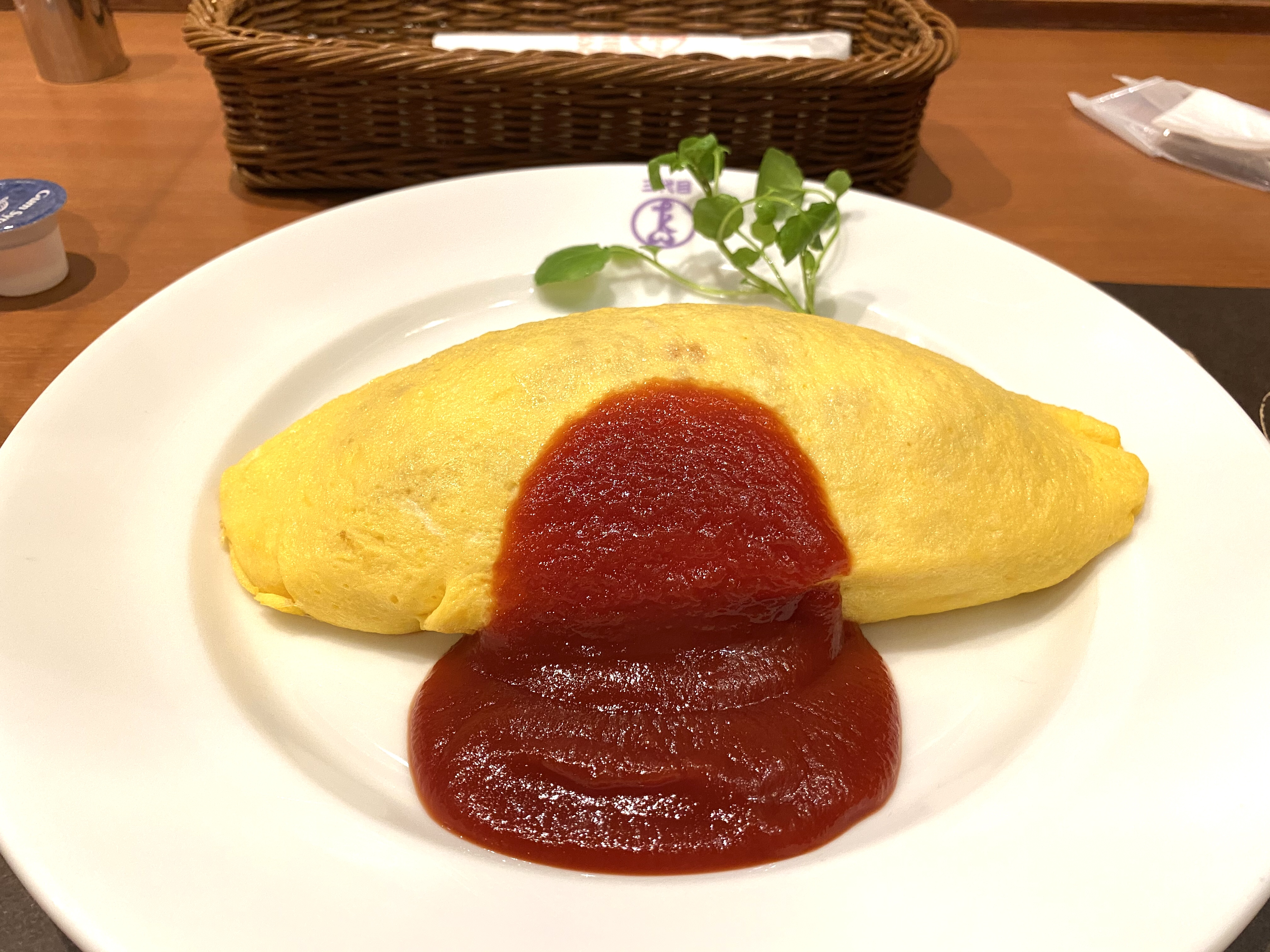
Omurice

=== Korea ===
In Korean cuisine, traditional omelettes are known as gyeran-mari (계란말이, "rolled-eggs") which is a type of savory banchan. Gyeran-mari is made with beaten eggs, mixed with finely diced vegetables, meats, and seafood. This side dish is often found in Korean banquet (janchi) meals, as well as Korean fast food (bunsik) restaurants.

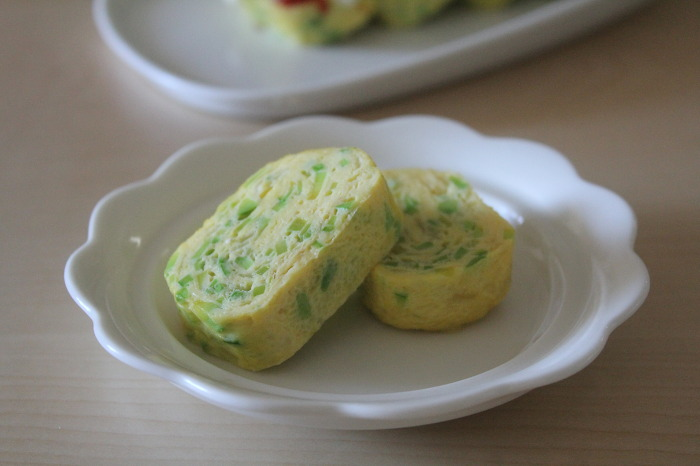
Gyeran-mari

=== Mexico and Central America ===
While the Spanish terms tortilla (in Spain) and torta (in the Philippines) are applied to an omelette dish, in Mexico and Central America tortilla is a term for a flatbread made of wheat or corn, while torta is used for a type of sandwich. An omelette in Mexico (and Central America) is sometimes called tortilla de huevos, but the term omelette is widely used.

=== Philippines ===
In the Philippines, omelettes are known as torta, usually encountered with the enclitic -ng ("tortang") indicating it modifies the next word (the main ingredient); e.g. tortang hipon = torta ("omelette") + -ng and hipon ("shrimp"), meaning "shrimp omelette". There are many types of torta which are named based on their main ingredients. They include:

- Tortang alamang or tortang hipon – an omelette with krill or small shrimp. Also known as shrimp fritters, although this term usually refers to okoy, a fritter made with shrimp and various vegetables (as well as other variations without shrimp).
- Tortang carne norte – an omelette made from corned beef mixed with eggs. A common cheap breakfast dish.
- Tortang dulong or maranay – an omelette, usually crispy, made with tiny fish from the family Salangidae known as dulong in Tagalog and ipon, libgao, or maranay in Visayan. It is sometimes called okoy, though traditional okoy is not an omelette, but rather a type of fritter made with glutinous rice.
- Tortang giniling or tortang picadillo – an omelette with ground meat (usually beef or pork) and sautéed vegetables.
- Tortang gulay – an omelette with peppers, mushrooms, onion, and garlic.
- Tortang kalabasa – an omelette made with finely julienned calabaza, eggs, flour, and salt.
- Tortang kamote – an omelette made with mashed sweet potato, eggs, flour, and salt.
- Tortang sardinas – an omelette made with shredded canned smoked sardines (tinapa).
- Tortang talong – an eggplant omelet with whole grilled eggplants. Versions stuffed with ground meat (giniling) and vegetables are called relyenong talong.
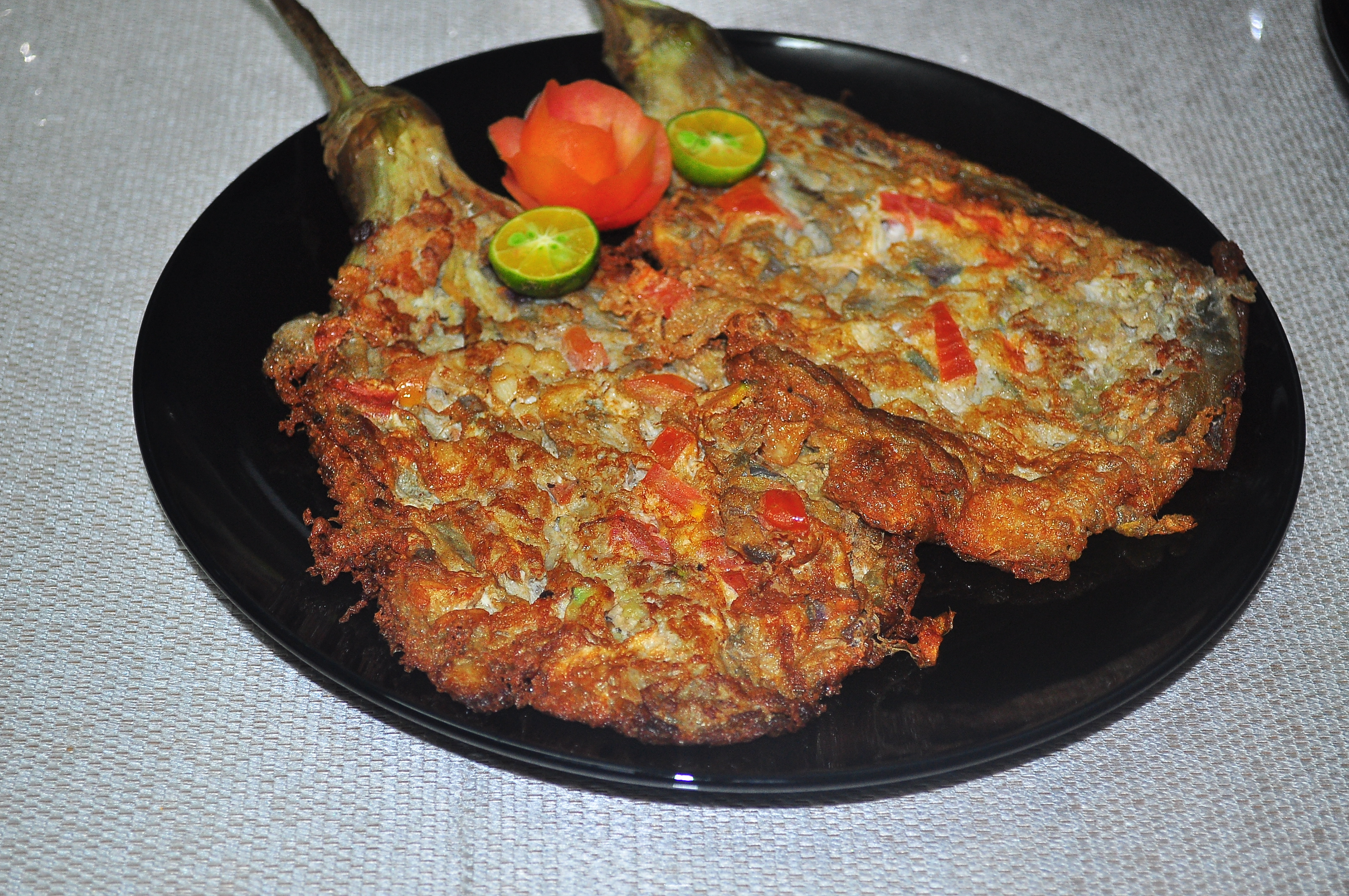
Tortang talong (grilled eggplant)

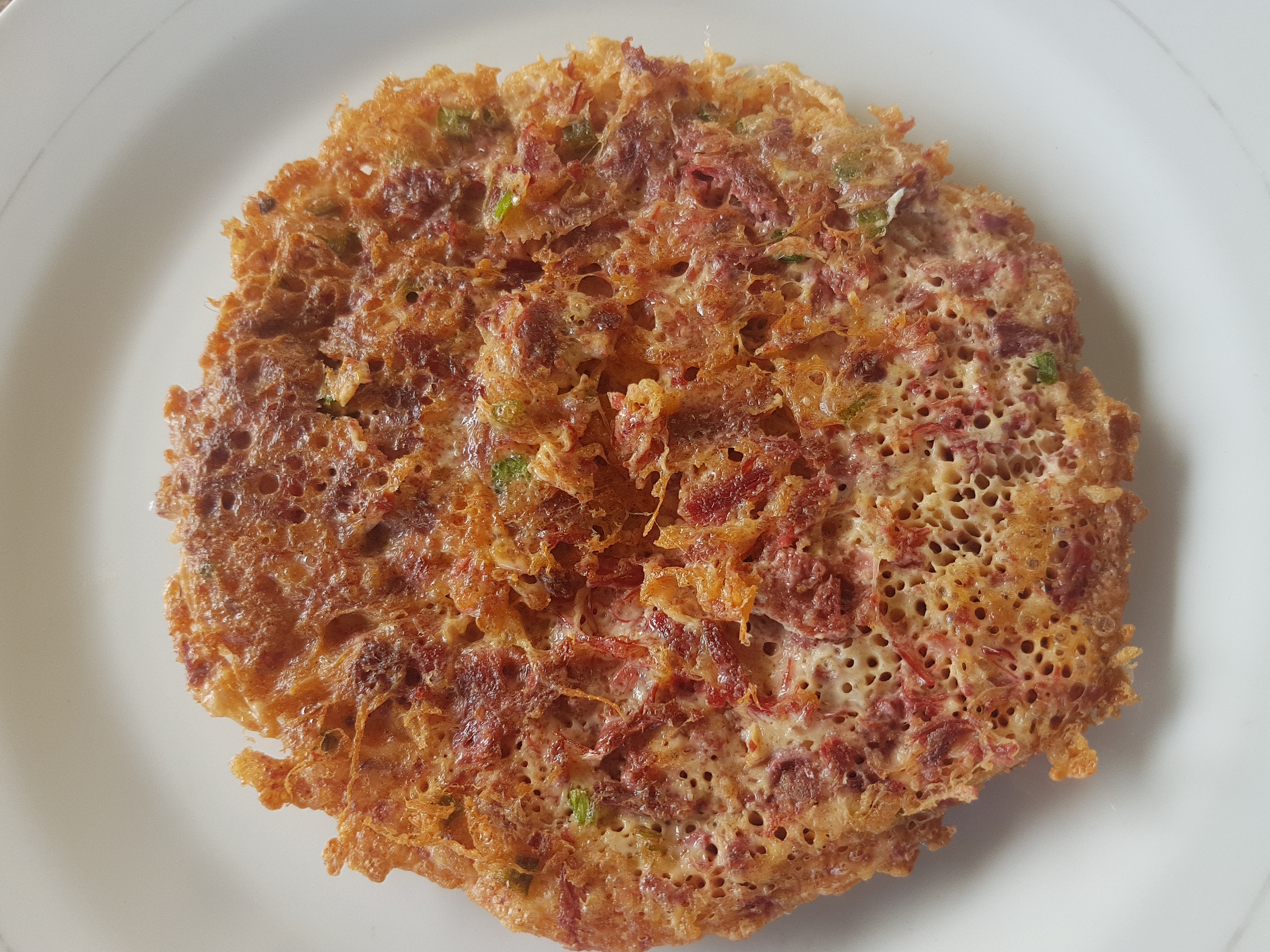
Tortang carne norte (corned beef)

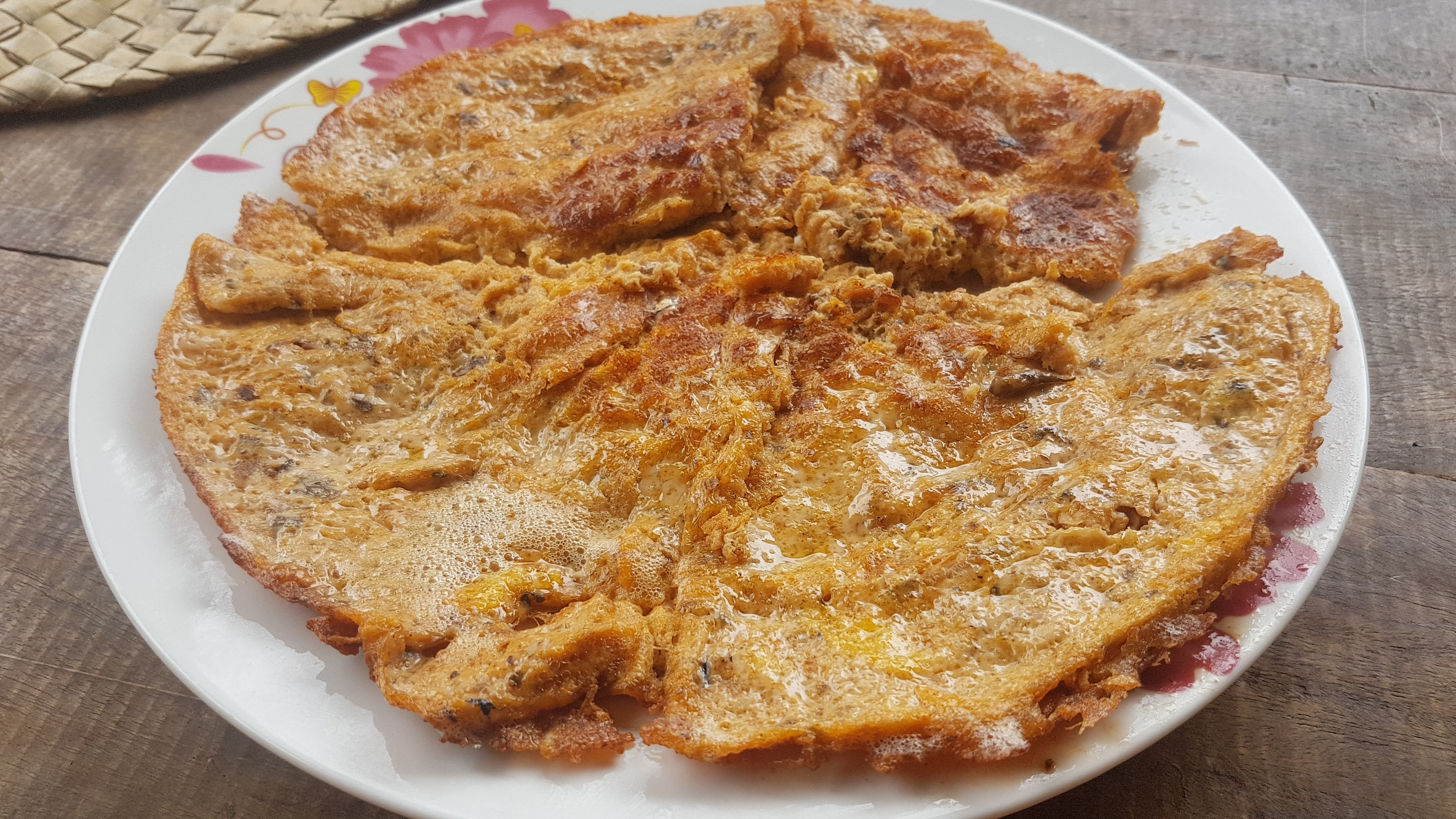
Tortang sardinas (smoked sardines)

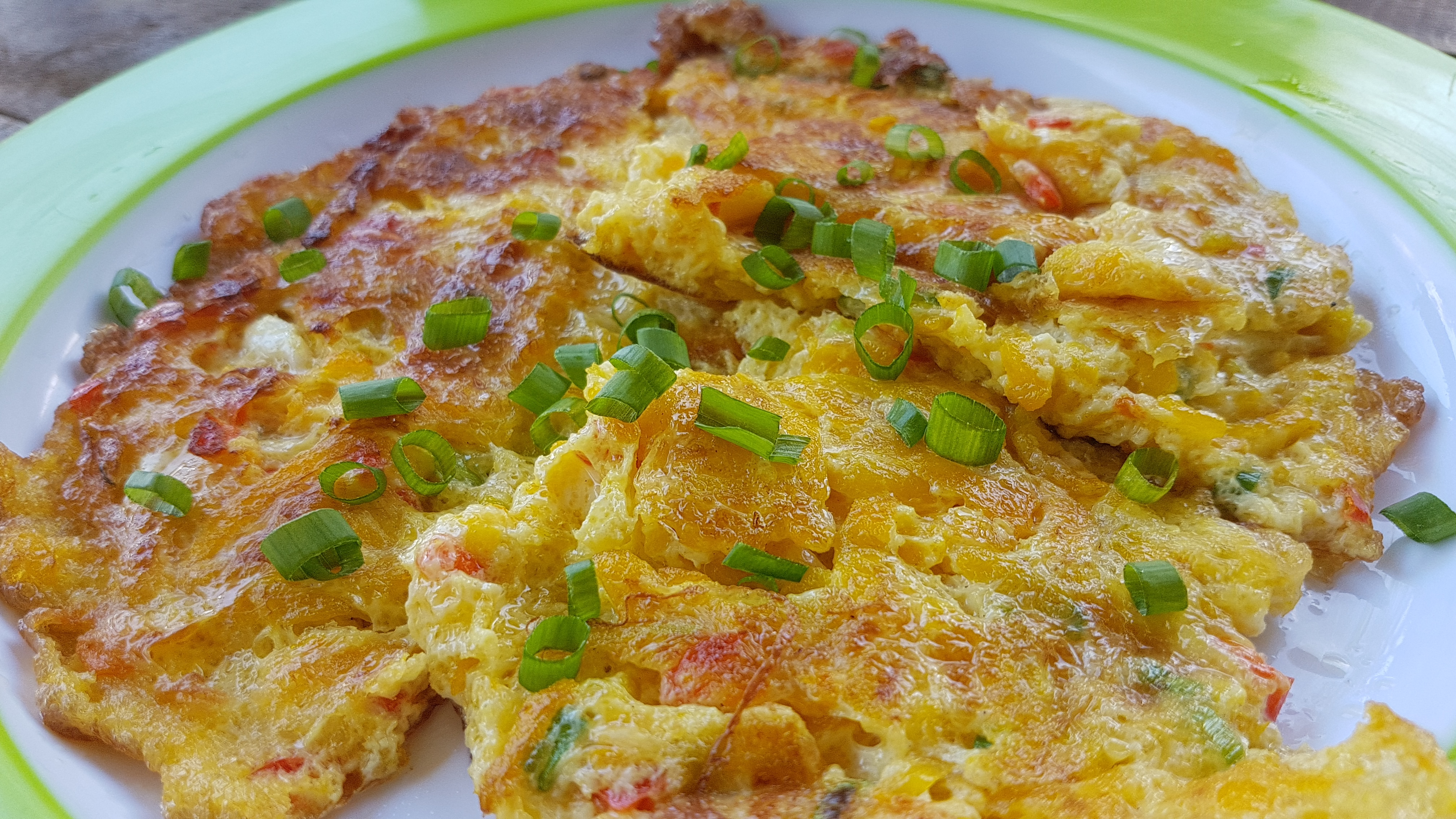
Tortang kalabasa (calabaza)

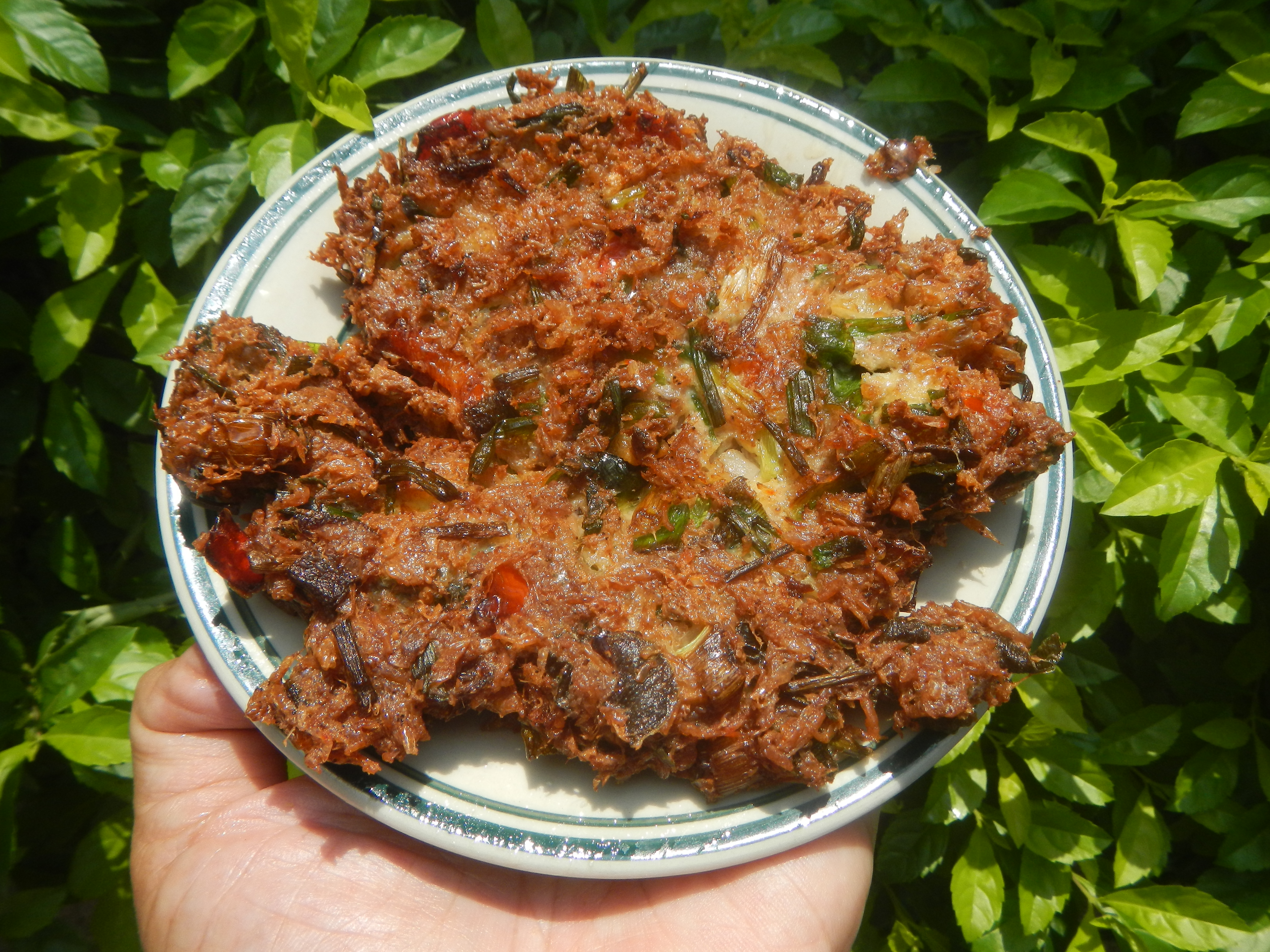
Tortang alamang (alamang shrimp)

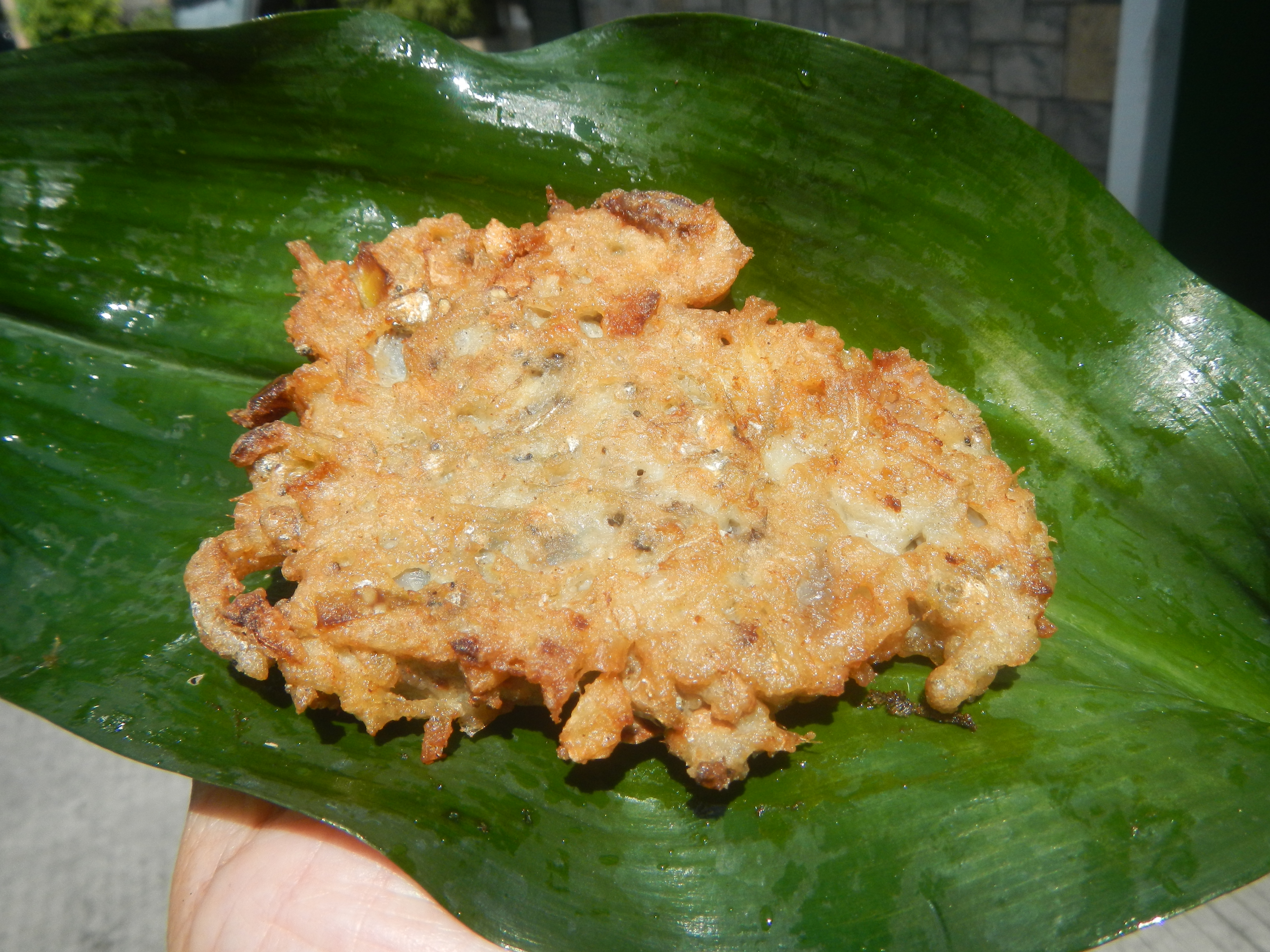
Tortang dilis (anchovies)

=== Pontic Greeks ===
Foustoron is an omelette made by the Pontic Greeks. Foustoron is made with eggs fried in butter or oil; the omelette can be served plain or seasoned. Some modern varieties include yogurt and cheese. The recipe varied widely by region: some recipes included onion and dried red peppers, while others did not.

=== Spain ===
The Spanish tortilla de patatas, or tortilla española in other Spanish-speaking countries, is a traditional and very popular thick omelette containing sliced potatoes sautéed in cooking oil. It often includes sliced onions (tortilla de patata con cebolla) and less commonly other additional fillings, such as cheese, bell peppers, or diced ham.

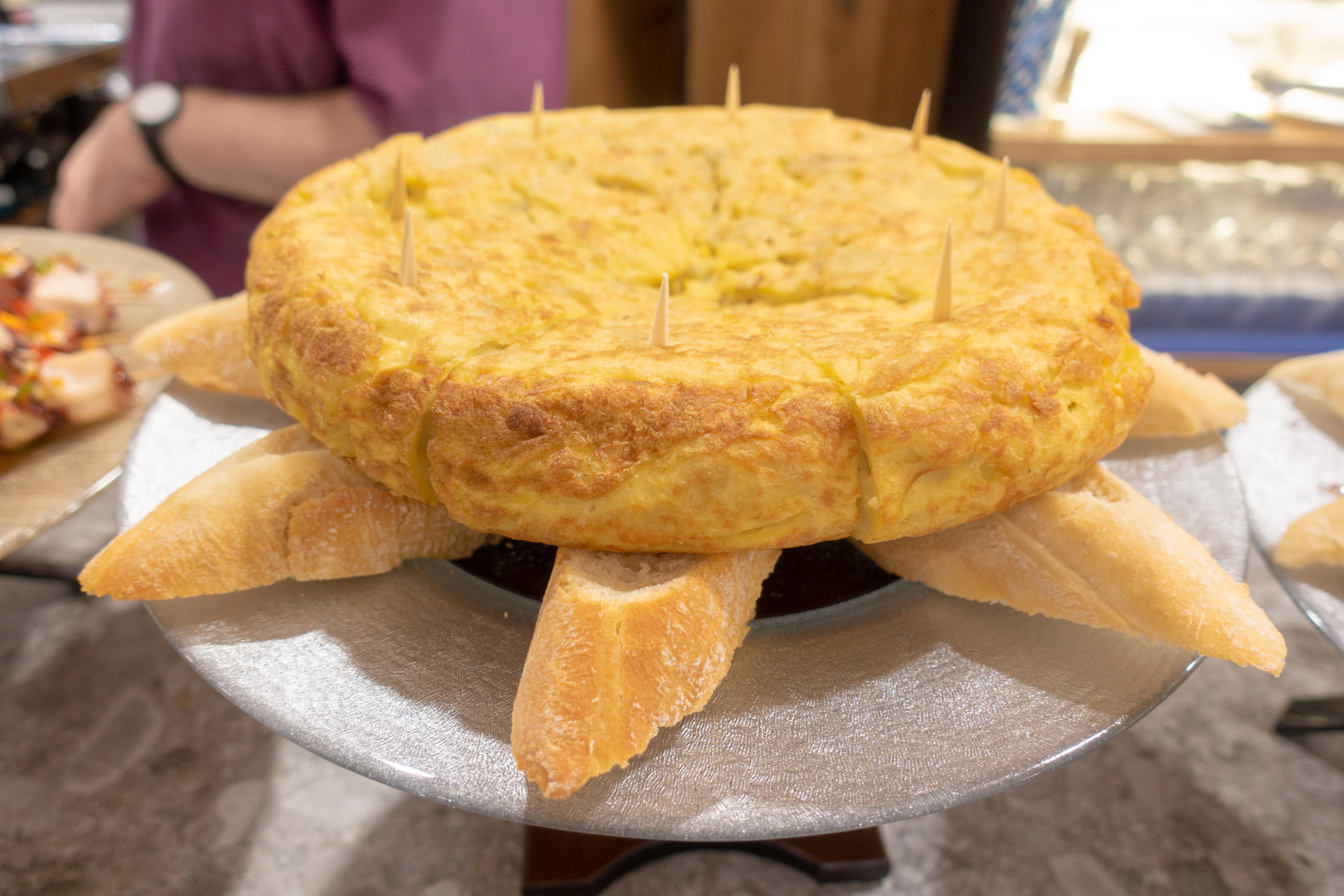
Tortilla de patatas

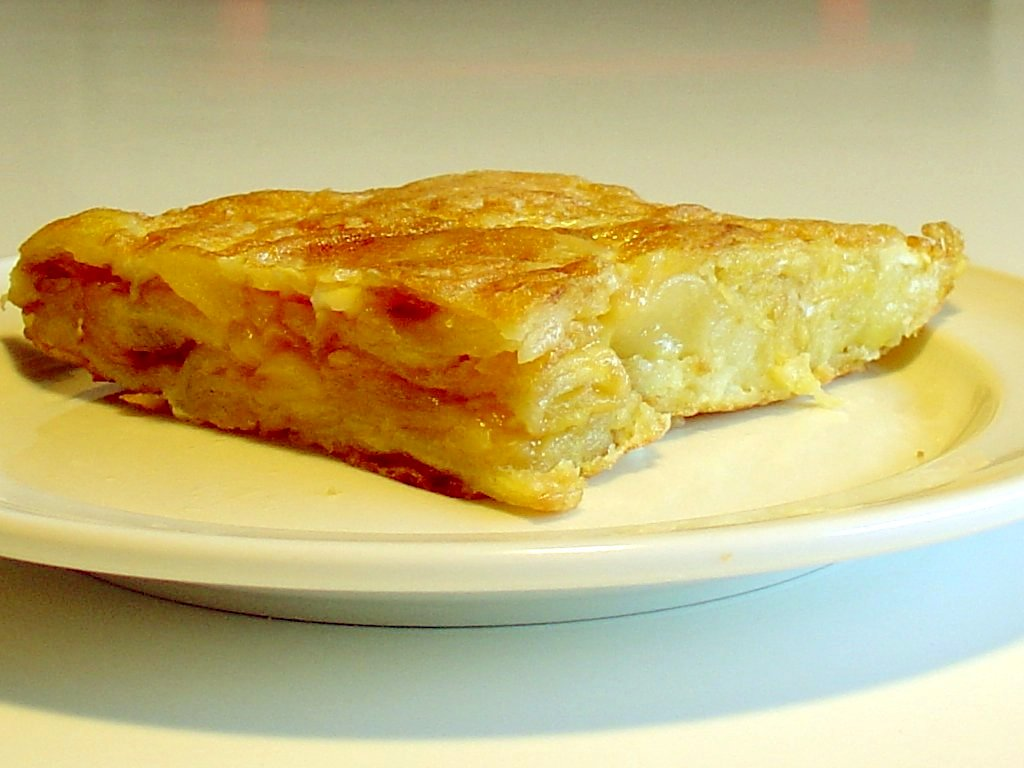
Tortilla de patatas

=== Thailand ===
In Thai cuisine, a traditional omelette is called khai jiao ไข่เจียว (khai meaning "egg", and jiao meaning fried), in which the beaten egg mixture and a small quantity of fish sauce is deep fried in a wok filled with 1-2 cups (~240–480 mL) of vegetable oil and served over steamed rice. The dish is usually served with Sriracha sauce and cilantro. A variation on this dish is khai chiao songkhrueang, where the plain egg omelette is served together with a stir-fry of meat and vegetables. Yet another type of Thai omelette is khai yat sai, literally "eggs filled with stuffing".

=== United Kingdom ===
An omelette Arnold Bennett incorporates smoked haddock, hard cheese (typically Cheddar) and cream. It was created by the chef Jean Baptiste Virlogeux at the Savoy Grill in London for the writer Arnold Bennett, who was a frequent customer. Cooks including Marcus Wareing, Delia Smith, Gordon Ramsay, Felicity Cloake and Hugh Fearnley-Whittingstall have published recipes.

=== United States ===
- The Denver omelette, also known as a Southwest omelette or Western omelette, is filled with diced ham, onions, and green bell peppers, though there are many variations on fillings. Often served in the Southwestern United States, it sometimes has a topping of cheese and a side dish of hash browns or fried potatoes.
- The hangtown fry, containing bacon and breaded oysters, originated in Placerville, California, during the Gold Rush.
- The egg white omelette omits the yolks to remove fat and cholesterol.

== Gallery ==
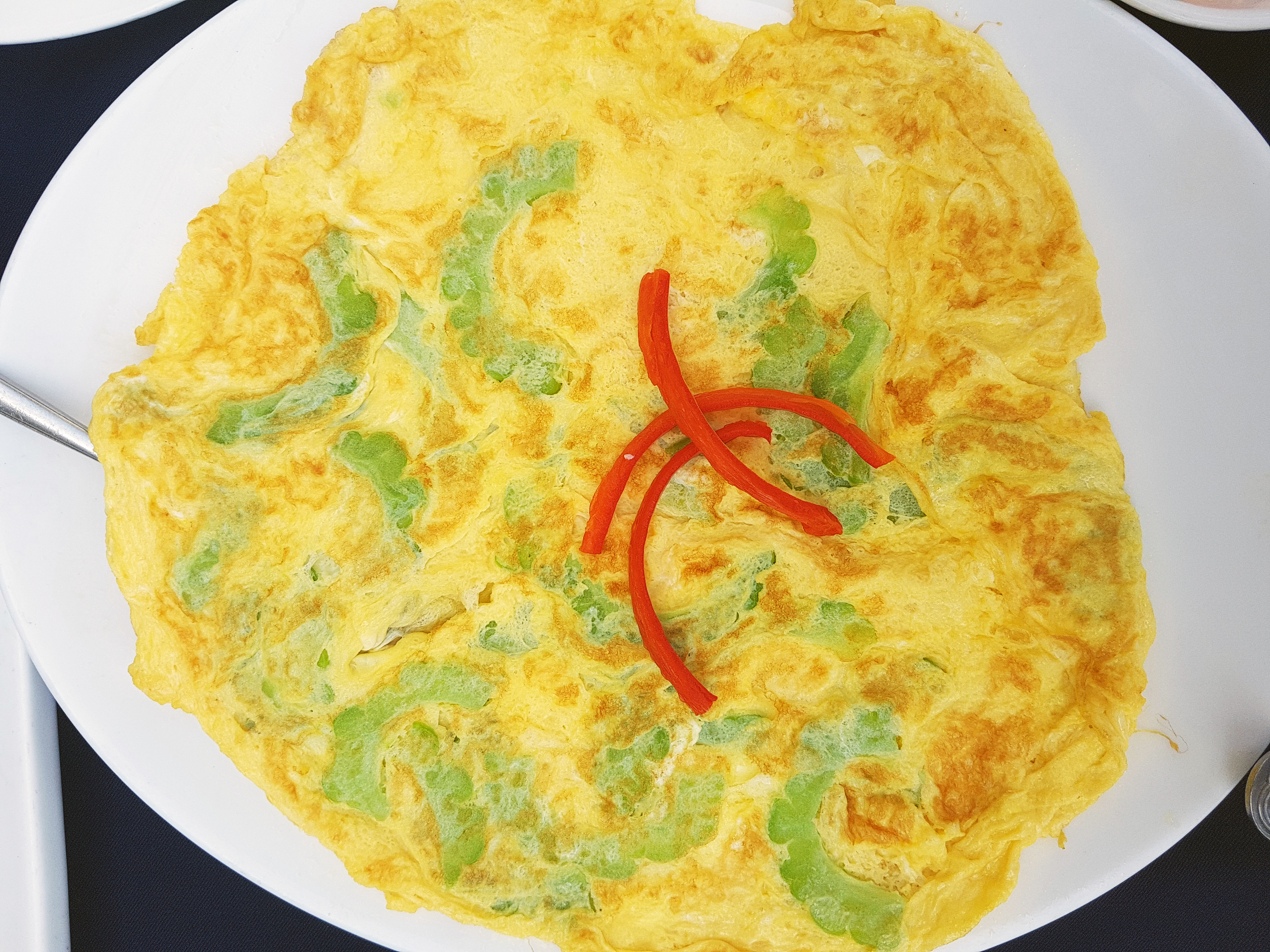
Bitter melon omelette, a common dish in Southeast Asia

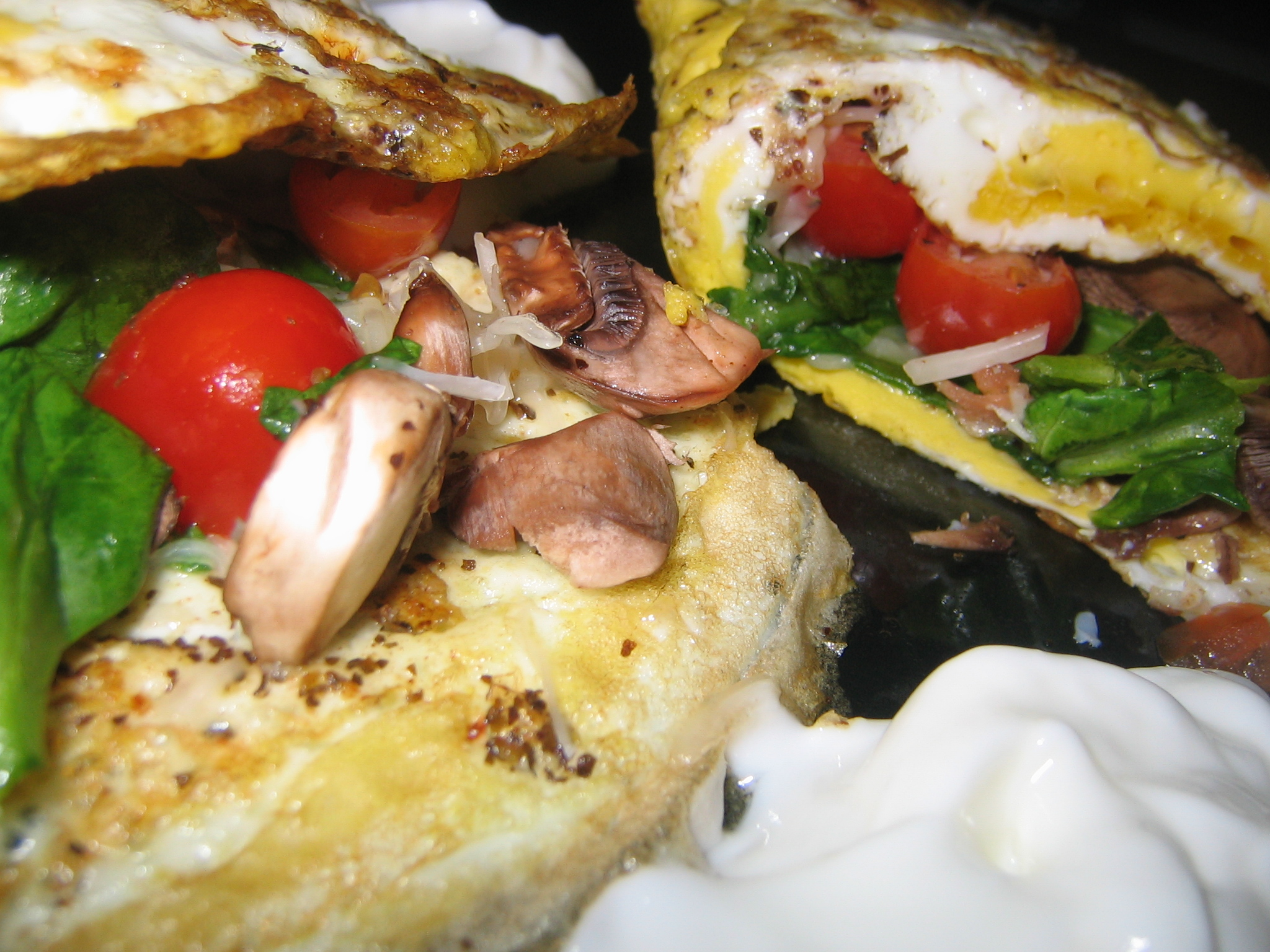
An omelette foldover

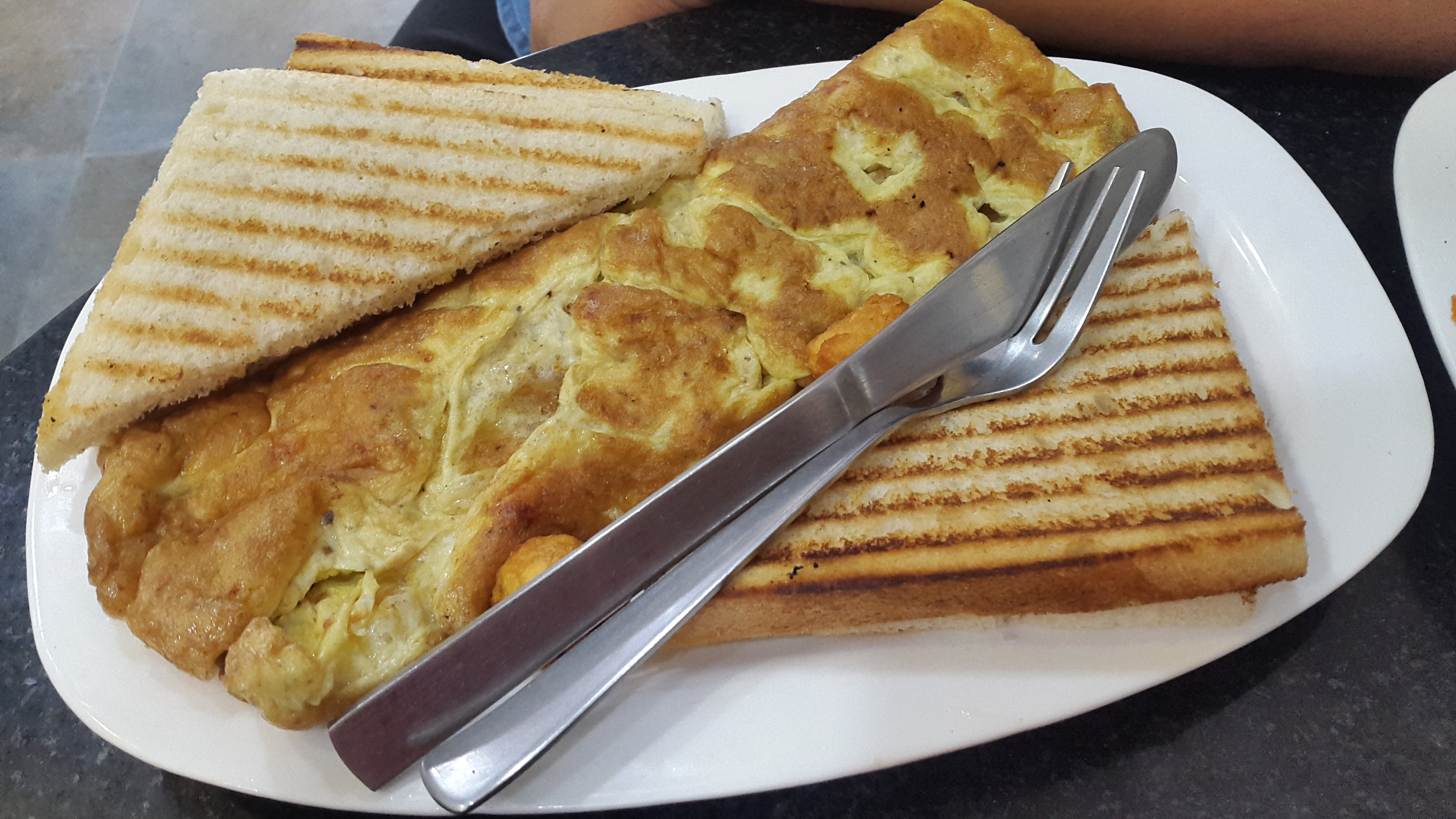
Masala omelette with bread toasties

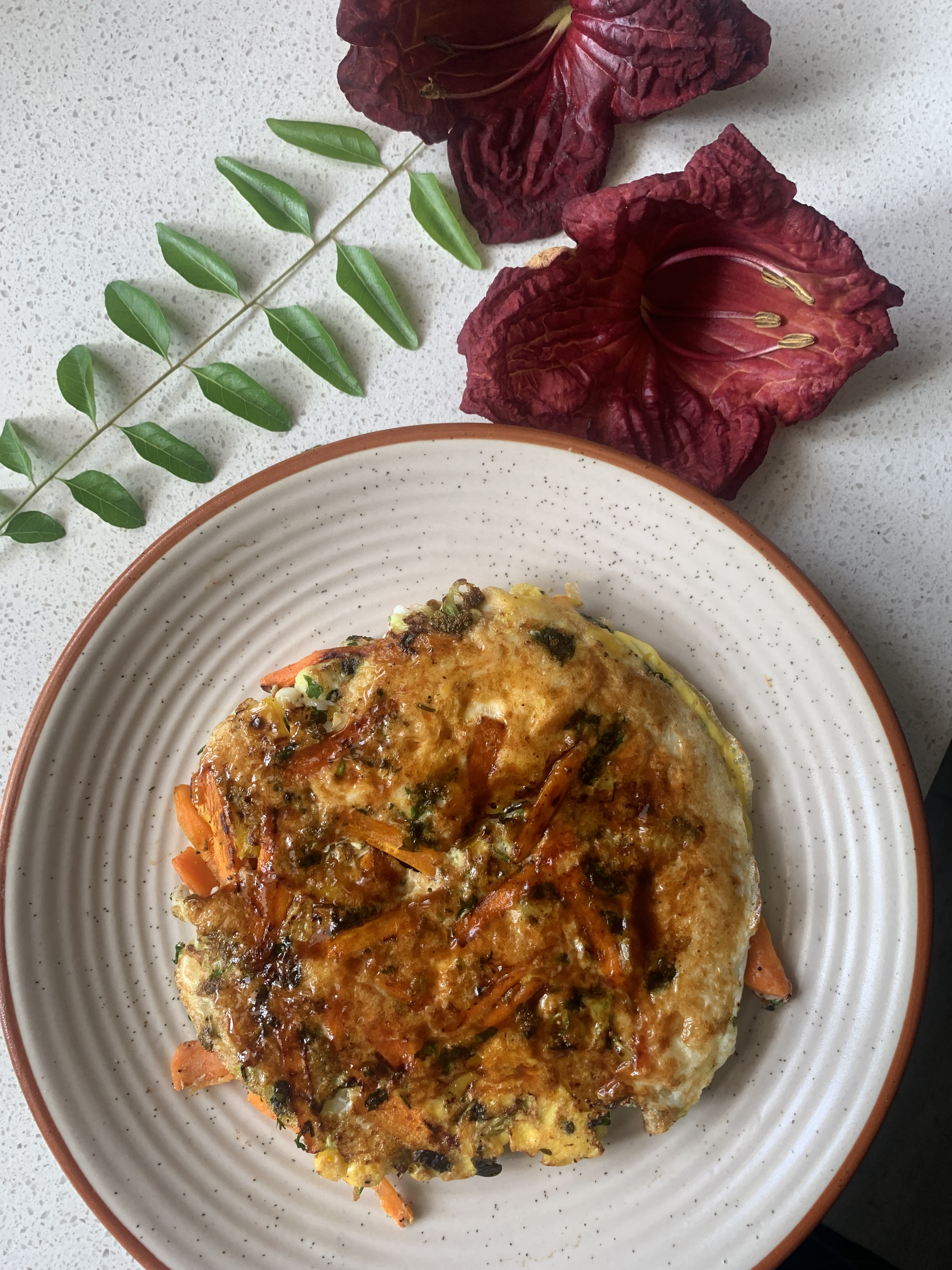
Vegetable omelette

== See also ==
- Bánh xèo
- List of brunch foods
- List of egg dishes
- Scrambled Eggs
- Shakshouka
