= Frittata =

Egg-based Italian dish

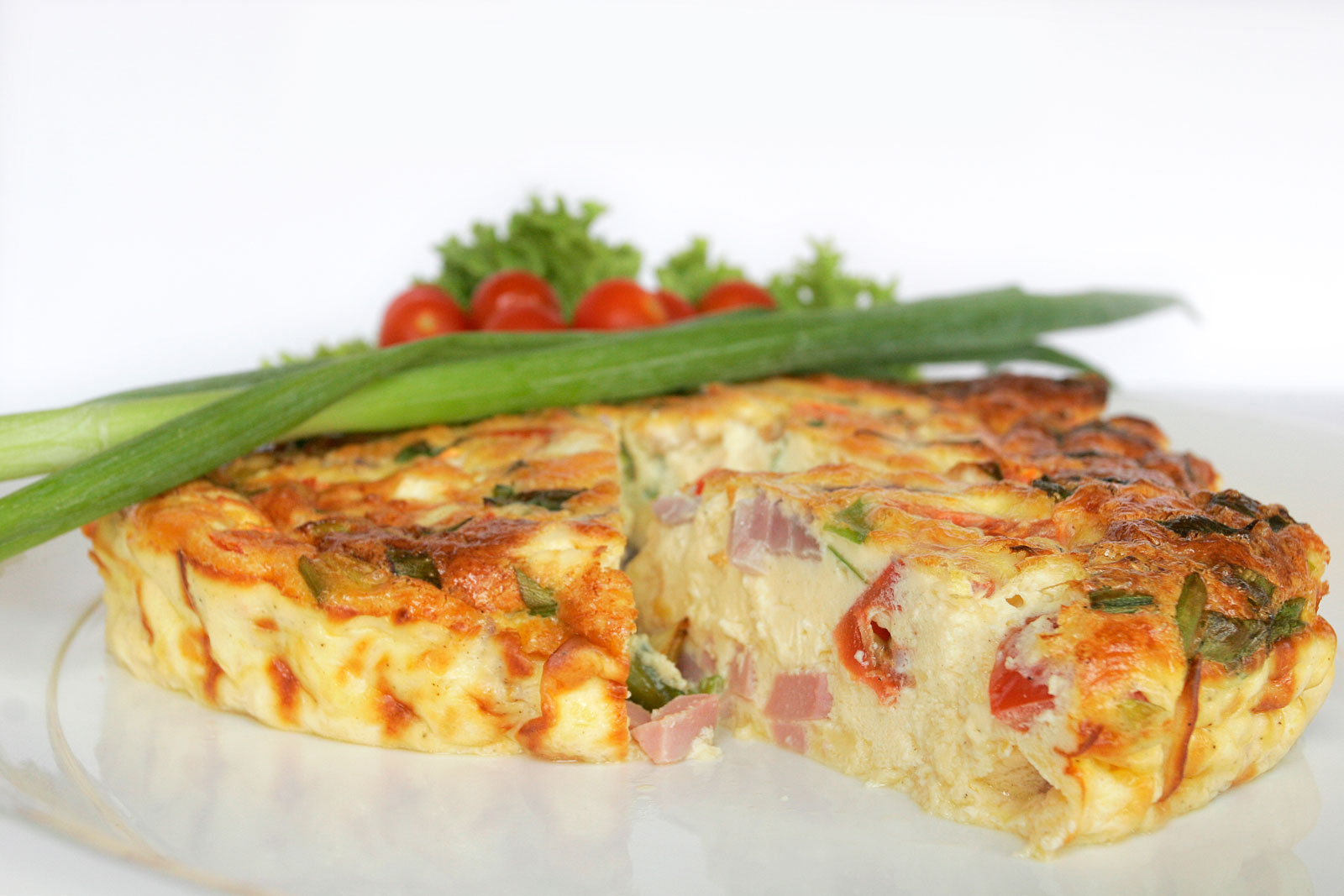
- Type: Omelette
- Place of origin: Italy
- Main ingredients: Fried beaten eggs
- Variations: Fritaja (Istria)

Frittata is an egg-based Italian dish, similar to an omelette, crustless quiche or scrambled eggs, enriched with additional ingredients such as meats, cheeses or vegetables.

== History ==
The Italian word frittata derives from friggere and roughly means 'fried'. This was originally a general term for cooking eggs in a frying pan. Outside Italy, frittata was seen as equivalent to "omelette" until at least the mid-1950s.

In Naples, the dish is claimed to have been invented locally. There, a variety made from pasta is most popular and is a source of local pride, with its creation held to represent a "stroke of Neapolitan genius", in contrast with an occasional perception outside the region that the version's creation and popularity signifies poverty and a lack of variety in Neapolitan cuisine. (Note: Food writer Arthur Schwartz summarizes the sentiment as expressed in jokes that "those poor people whose cuisine is so limited and who eat so much pasta that they even put it in their omelets".) In the Naples region, frittatas are always thin. Varieties made without spaghetti are also commonly eaten, in smaller portions in the antipasto course and in larger pieces as a main course.

== Variations ==
Frittata has come to be a term for a distinct variation that Delia Smith describes as "Italy's version of an open-face omelette". When used in this sense, there are four key differences from a conventional omelette:

- While there may or may not be additional ingredients, such as cubed potato, such ingredients are combined with the beaten egg mixture while the eggs are still raw rather than being laid over the mostly cooked egg mixture before it is folded, as in an omelette.
- Eggs may be beaten vigorously, to incorporate more air than traditional savoury omelettes, to allow a deeper filling and a fluffier result.
- The mixture is cooked over a very low heat, more slowly than an omelette, for at least five minutes, typically 15, until the underside is set but the top is still runny.
- The partly cooked frittata is not folded to enclose its contents, like an omelette, but is instead either turned over in full, or grilled briefly under an intense salamander to set the top layer, or baked for around five minutes.

== See also ==
- List of egg dishes
