= Cuisine of the Maritimes =

Culinary traditions of the Maritimes, Canada

The Maritimes consist of the provinces of New Brunswick, Nova Scotia and Prince Edward Island. Some of the cuisine has its origins in the foods of the indigenous peoples of the region.

== History ==
The history of the cuisine of the Maritimes refers to the culinary traditions and practices that have developed over centuries in the Canadian provinces of Nova Scotia, New Brunswick, and Prince Edward Island. The Maritimes are known for their rich natural resources, coastal and island landscapes, and a unique blend of Indigenous, French, British, and Irish cultural influences. These factors have contributed to the development of a diverse cuisine, with seafood playing a prominent role.

The main eras are the following:

- Early Indigenous Cuisine
- French and Acadian Influence
- British and Irish Influence

=== Early Indigenous Cuisine ===
Before the arrival of European settlers, the Indigenous people of the Maritimes, including the Mi'kmaq, Maliseet, and Passamaquoddy, relied on the region's abundant resources for sustencance. They hunted, fished, and gathered a wide variety of ingredients, such as fish, shellfish, game, berries, and roots. Traditional Indigenous dishes included ingredients such as corn, beans, squash, and sunflower seeds. Smoking, drying, and fermenting were commonly used as food preservation methods.

=== French and Acadian Influence ===
The French were the first Europeans to settle in the Maritimes, with the establishment of Port Royal in 1605. Their culinary influence is still evident today, particularly in the Acadian communities of New Brunswick and Nova Scotia. French settlers introduced new ingredients and cooking techniques, such as the use of dairy products, baking, and the concept of the "pot-au-feu," a slow-cooked meat and vegetable dish. Acadian dishes like rappie pie, a grated potato and meat pie, and poutine râpée, a boiled potato dumpling filled with pork, are still popular in the region.

=== British and Irish Influence ===
The British and Irish settlers who arrived in the Maritimes in the 18th and 19th centuries brought their own culinary traditions and ingredients, such as potatoes, cabbage, and oats. They also introduced new food preservation techniques, like pickling and canning. These settlers influenced the development of dishes like fish and brewis, a Newfoundland specialty made from salted cod, hard bread, and fatback, and Irish stew, a meat and vegetable dish popular in New Brunswick.

== Unique dishes or recipes ==
One unique Acadian dish is poutine râpée, a potato dumpling that is usually stuffed with salted pork and simmered for three or four hours. Usually served as a main course, it is also often served as a desert with brown sugar or molasses or another sweetener. Rapée/rapie pie is an Acadian poultry dish. Seafood is of great importance in the Maritimes and it is prepared in many ways. Lobster rolls are commonly found throughout the province of New Brunswick, and are a dish typical of the locals; these can be found in the United States as well, particularly in Maine, which adjoins the Province of New Brunswick, the only province with two official languages, French and English. This is an indication of the culture found in New Brunswick, the province between Quebec and Nova Scotia.

Another common food among Maritimers is dulse; dulse is seaweed of a certain type and grows along the New Brunswick and Nova Scotia coasts. Some Maritimers eat dried dulse, a reddish-purple-to-black salty-tasting snack, eaten similarly to potato chips. The popular dulse, lettuce and tomato (DLT) sandwich is a dish found at the historic Saint John City Market.

Potatoes are a staple in Maritime cuisine, being a mainstay crop in New Brunswick and Prince Edward Island. Hash brown casserole made with potato, cheese and cream, and potato pancakes similar to Irish boxty, are popular breakfast dishes.

Maple sugar, in many forms, from maple syrup (sirop d'érable) to maple-leaf-shaped crunchy candies, is an important sweet in Eastern Canada, where sugaring-off excursions (involving 'tire d'érable sur la neige,' when the hot syrup is poured onto the snow to crystallize) are a popular winter activity. It is also an important export economically.

Wild blueberries grow in abundance in the Maritimes and are commonly picked, although they are small compared to commercially available blueberries. They can be made into the dumpling dessert called blueberry grunt, among others.

In Nova Scotia, a dish known as hodge podge or hodegy podegy is widely eaten in the Annapolis Valley. This dish is a stew or soup containing fresh vegetables such as small baby potatoes or new potatoes, fresh peas, green beans and wax beans and carrots. These vegetables are cooked in a milk broth that contains butter, pepper and salt. Commonly, this dish is accompanied by corned beef either from a can or prepared separately from the dish. Hodge podge is generally consumed during July and August when these vegetables are in season.

Back in the first decade of the twentieth century, the wife of Thomas Ashburnham, 6th Earl of Ashburnham was a well-known high-society patron in Fredericton, and her homemade mustard pickle recipe became a regional delicacy. The homemade mustard pickles, sometimes referred to as "Lady Ashburnham", "Lady Ashburn", or "Lady A" pickles (in honour of the creator), are sold at locally owned supermarkets and local events like farmer's markets, and are typically eaten at Thanksgiving and/or Christmas dinners.

== Restaurants and pubs ==
Many restaurants and pubs in the area offer dishes such as corned beef and cabbage, bacon and cabbage, bangers and mash, and fish and chips, as well as Newfoundland specialties such as Jiggs dinner.

There are many small craft breweries in the Maritimes as well as the flagship Maritime breweries of Nova Scotia's Alexander Keith's and Prince Edward Island's Gahan.

== See also ==
- Acadian cuisine
- Maritimes
- Local food

== Categories ==
- Food and drink
- Snack foods
