= Sopa de fideo =

Type of stock-based noodle soup

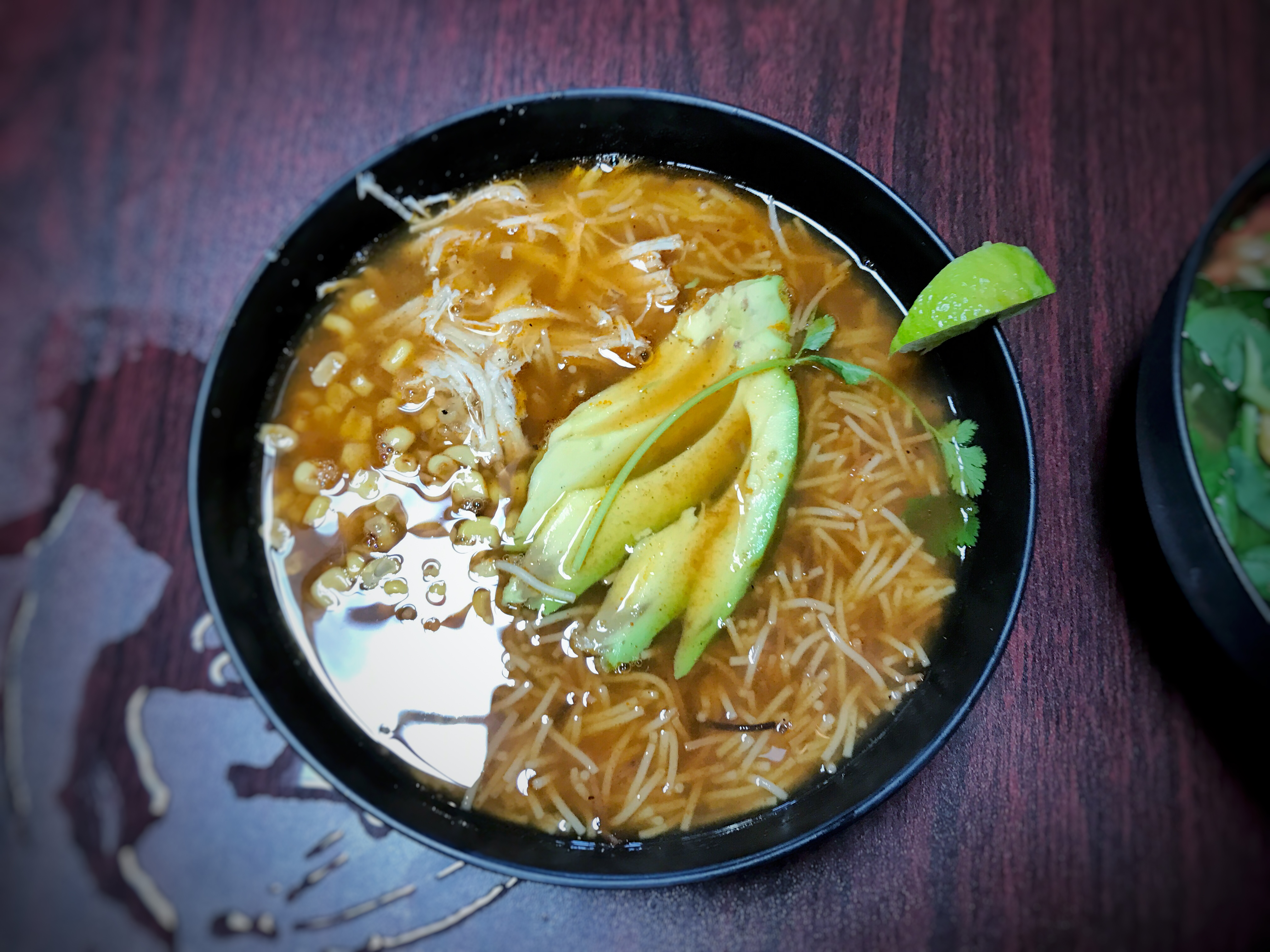
Sopa de fideo from California with corn and chicken, garnished with avocado and a lime wedge

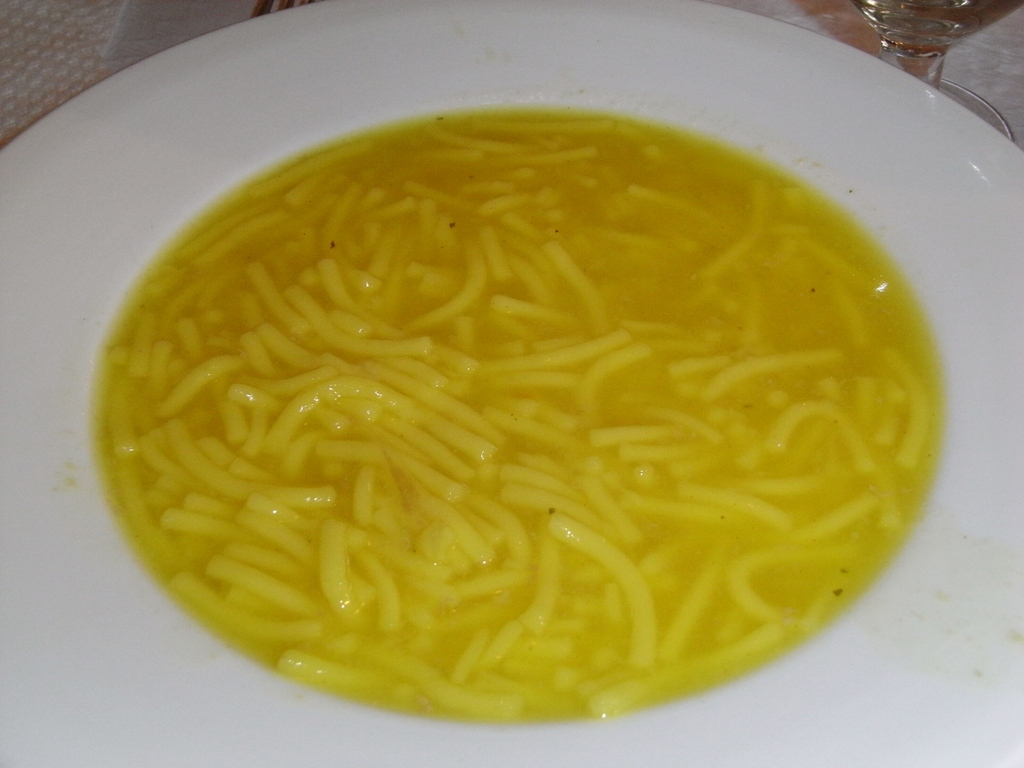
Sopa de fideo from Spain

Sopa de fideo (Spanish for "noodle soup"), also referred to as sopita de fideo, is a stock-based noodle soup that is a part of the cuisines of Spain, Mexico, and Cavite, a province in the Philippines.

== Description ==
In Spain and Mexico, sopa de fideo is made with thin noodles (typically vermicelli and angel hair pasta) which are typically broken or cut and then browned separately prior to being stewed in stock with the other soup ingredients. Additional soup ingredients include bell pepper, onion and garlic, tomatoes, tomato sauce, chicken, chili peppers, vegetable oil, salt and pepper.

Sopa de fideo in the Philippines differs significantly in the ingredients and the noodles used. It uses glass noodles (sotanghon) in chicken stock with tomato sauce, milk, beans (mung beans or garbanzos), garlic, onions, and corn kernels. It also includes meat ingredients like ham, ground pork (giniling), chicken liver, and chicken gizzards.

== See also ==
- Macaroni soup
- Sopas
- List of Mexican dishes
- List of soups
