= New England boiled dinner =

Traditional American regional dish

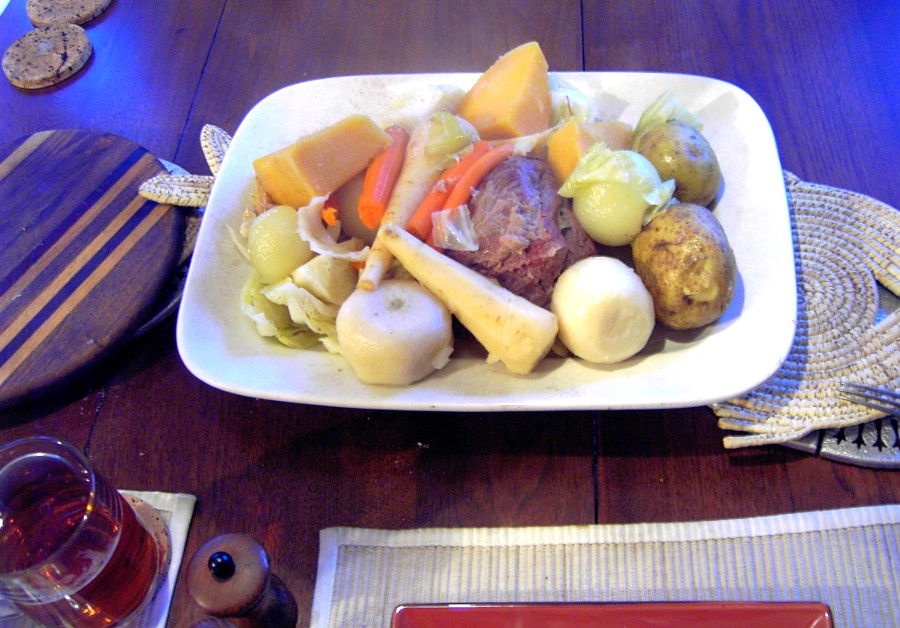
New England boiled dinner with cabbage, potato, white turnip, rutabaga, carrot, onion, and parsnip

A New England boiled dinner is a New England dish consisting of corned beef with cabbage and one or more root vegetables, such as potatoes, rutabagas, parsnips, carrots, turnips, or onions. The leftovers are often diced and fried into "red flannel hash" for breakfast the next day. The dish resembles boiled beef from English cuisine, as well as a similar Newfoundland dish called a "Jiggs dinner".

Corned beef and cabbage, a boiled meal prepared by Irish-Americans on St. Patrick's Day, is similar, but typically contains fewer types of root vegetables. Irish immigrants who arrived in America in the 19th century substituted corned beef in the Irish dish bacon and cabbage. Corned beef, which most Irish could not afford in Ireland, was relatively cheap in American cities at the time, and Irish immigrants quickly adopted this former luxury.

== Preparation ==
A corned beef is placed whole in a pot on stove, or in a slow cooker, with water to cover the meat. The meat is simmered until nearly tender, then the cabbage and root vegetables are added and cooked through.

== See also ==
- List of regional dishes of the United States
- Pot-au-feu
