= Jiggs dinner =

Irish food in Newfoundland

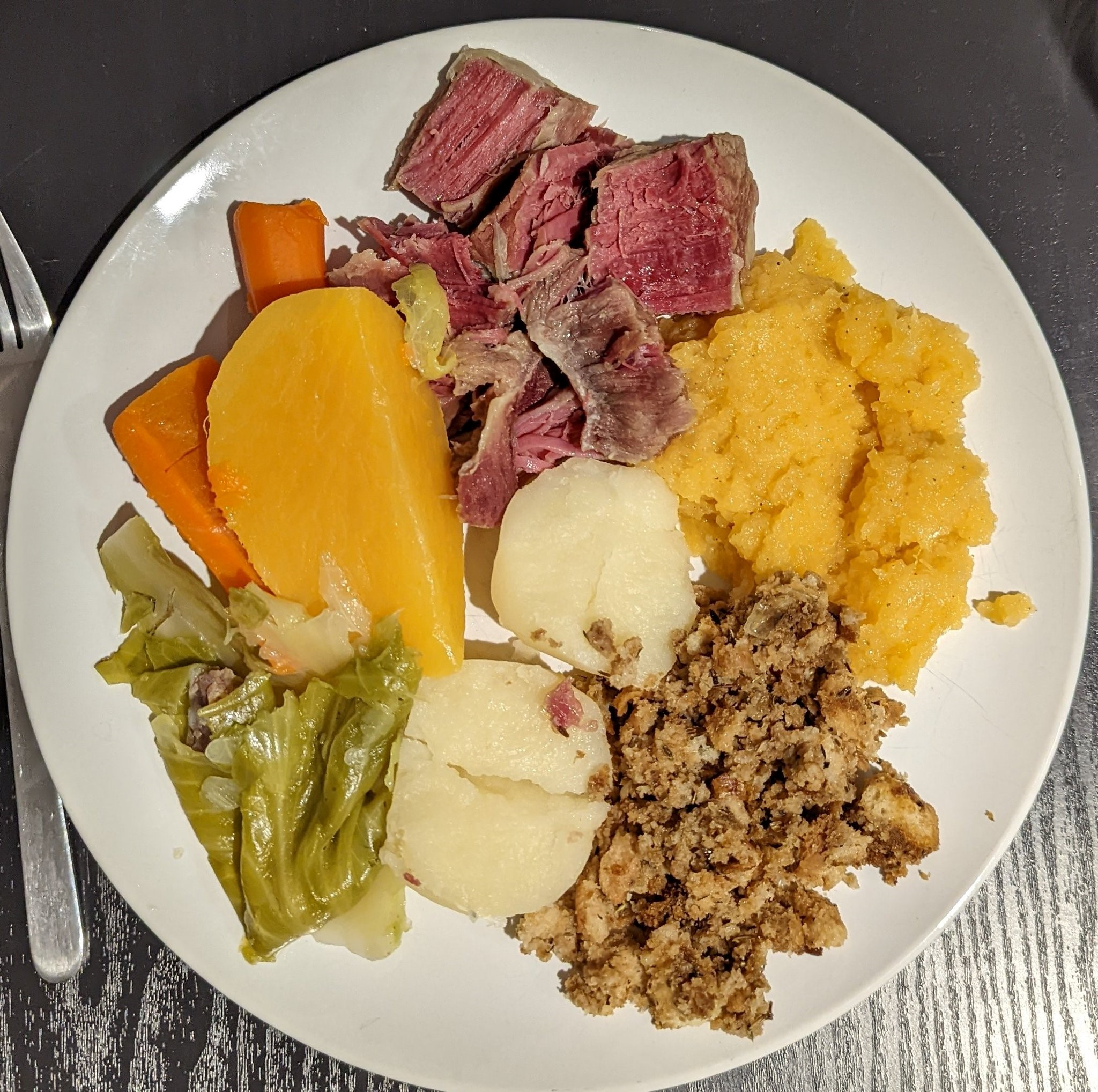
Jiggs dinner: cabbage, turnip, carrot, salt meat, mashed turnip, dressing, potatoes

Jiggs dinner, also called boiled dinner or cooked dinner, is a traditional meal commonly prepared and eaten on Sundays in Newfoundland. Corned beef and cabbage was the favourite meal of Jiggs, the central character in the popular, long-running comic strip Bringing Up Father by George McManus and Zeke Zekley.

The name of the dish is also occasionally rendered as Jigs dinner or Jigg's dinner, and it may be referred to colloquially as JD.

== Ingredients ==
The meal most typically consists of salt beef (or salt riblets), boiled together with potatoes, carrot, cabbage, turnip, and greens. Pease pudding and figgy duff are cooked in pudding bags immersed in the rich broth that the meat and vegetables create. Condiments are likely to include mustard pickles, pickled beets, cranberry sauce, butter, and a thin gravy made from the cooking broth.

The leftover vegetables from a Jiggs dinner are often mixed into a pan and fried to make a dish known as "cabbage hash" or "corned beef and cabbage hash", much like bubble and squeak.

== History ==
Corned beef was originally a luxury in Ireland, but it became a major export to the British and French colonies in the 17th century. It was available at low cost in North America, and Irish-Americans incorporated it alongside cheaper vegetables such as carrots and potatoes.

The Bringing Up Father strip of the 7 November 1922 edition of The Evening Telegraph includes a riff that says the dish is a favourite of Jiggs, the main character of the series. Jiggs is an Irish-American worker who won a sweepstake but is still fond of the lower-class lifestyle. Corned beef and cabbage was already a staple of the Irish–American diet, but the popularity of the comic associated the dish to the character. By the 1920s and 1930s, "Jiggs dinners" and "Jiggs suppers" were used to advertise fundraising events in Newfoundland, with the assumption that the reader knew the name.

== See also ==
- Corned beef
- New England boiled dinner
