= Sopas =

Filipino macaroni soup

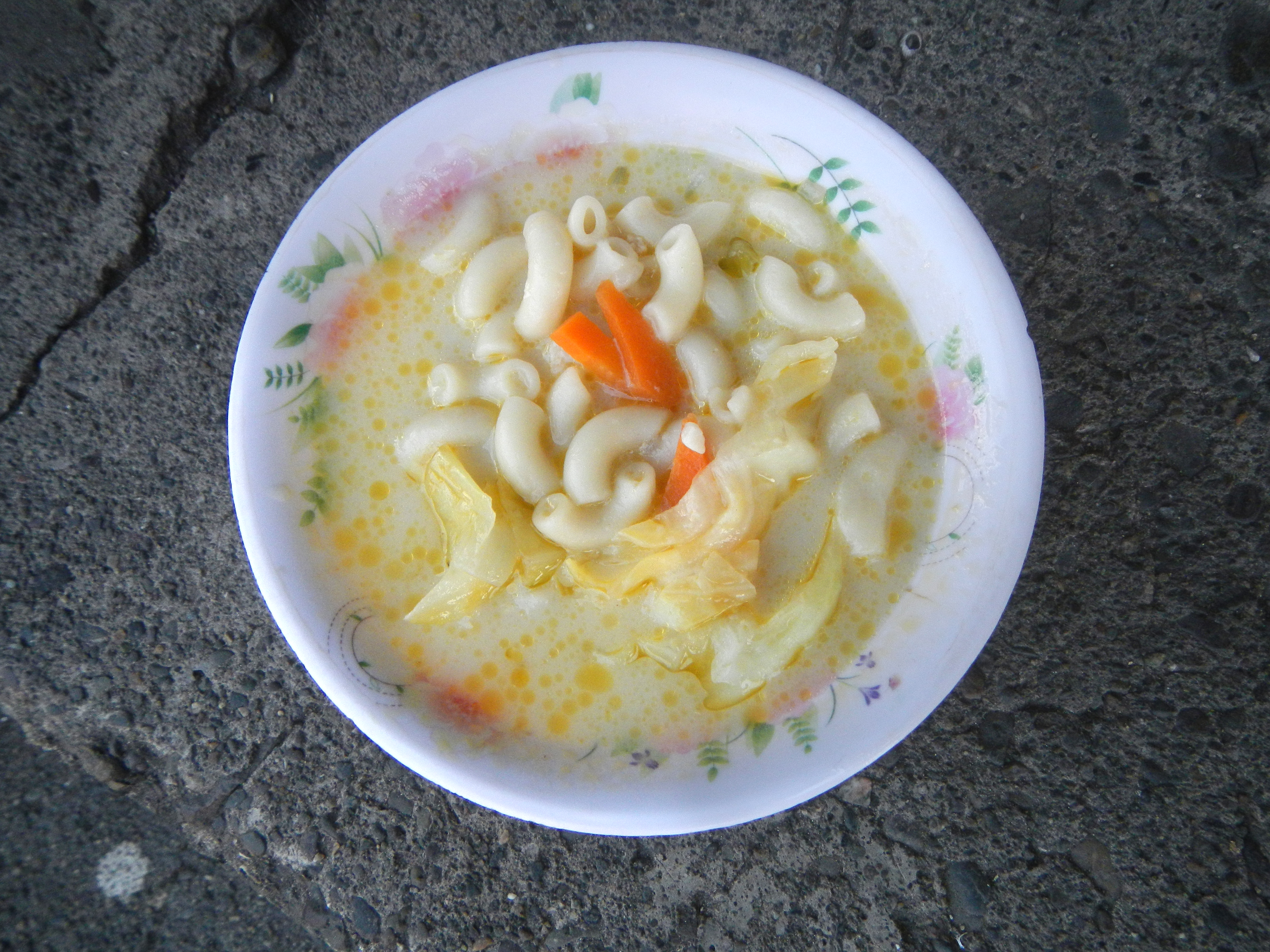
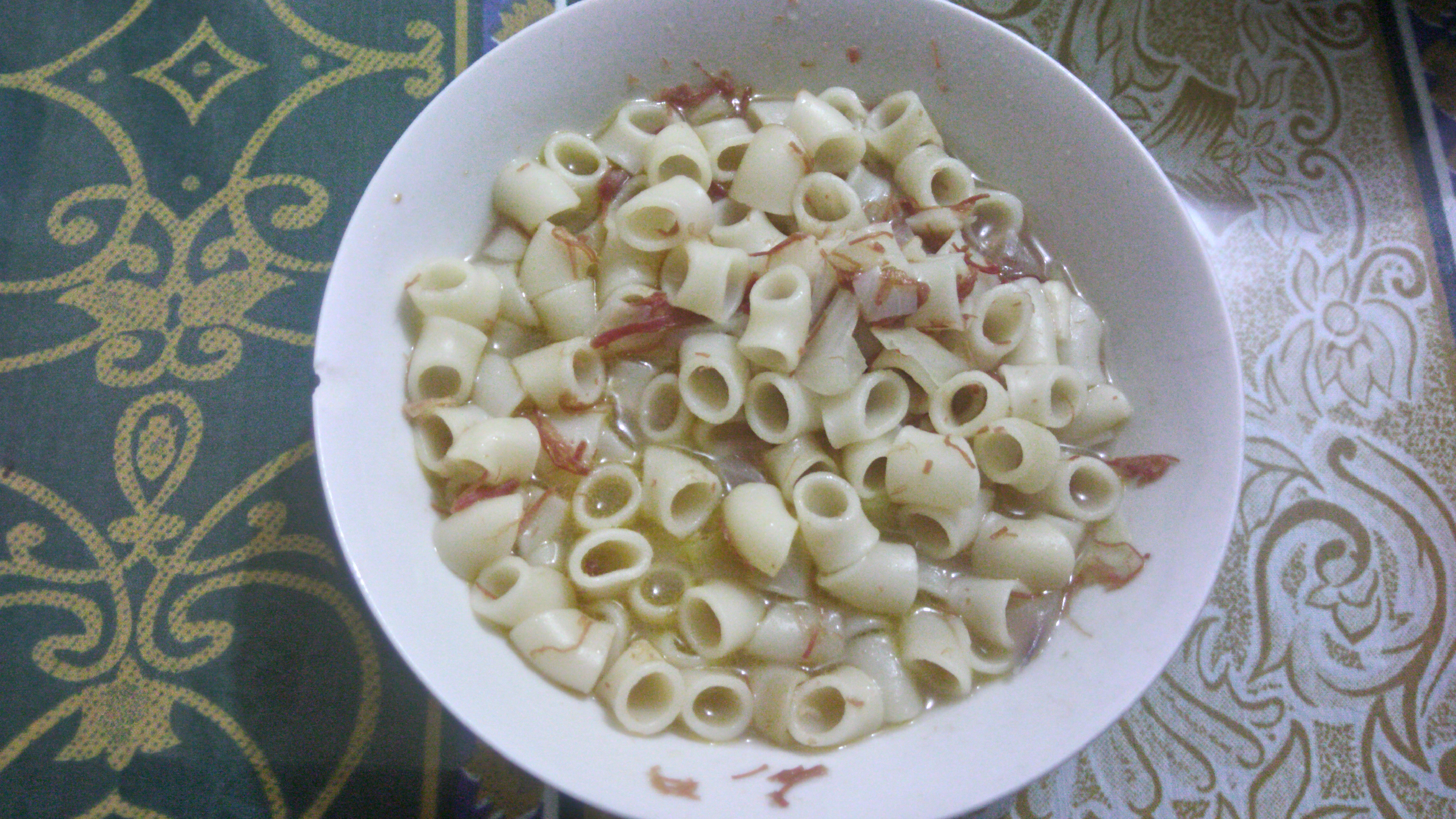
- Top: Chicken sopas with tomatoes, carrots, and cabbage Bottom: Sopas with corned beef
- Alternative names: creamy macaroni soup
- Type: Pasta
- Course: Main dish
- Place of origin: Philippines
- Serving temperature: hot, warm
- Main ingredients: elbow macaroni, evaporated milk, chicken (or beef/pork), butter, garlic, onion
- Similar dishes: chicken noodle soup, sopa de fideo, suam na mais, lugaw, arroz caldo, chicken macaroni salad

Sopas is a Filipino macaroni soup made with elbow macaroni, various vegetables, and meat (usually chicken), in a creamy broth with evaporated milk. Sometimes, spaghetti is used instead of elbow macaroni as an alternative. This variant of sopas is called spapas. It is regarded as a comfort food in the Philippines and is typically eaten for breakfast or during cold weather, or served to sick people.

== Origin ==
The dish is the Filipino version of the American chicken noodle soup, introduced during the American colonial period of the Philippines. The name simply means "soup" in Tagalog, from Spanish sopa ("soup"), of which sopas is the plural.

== Description ==
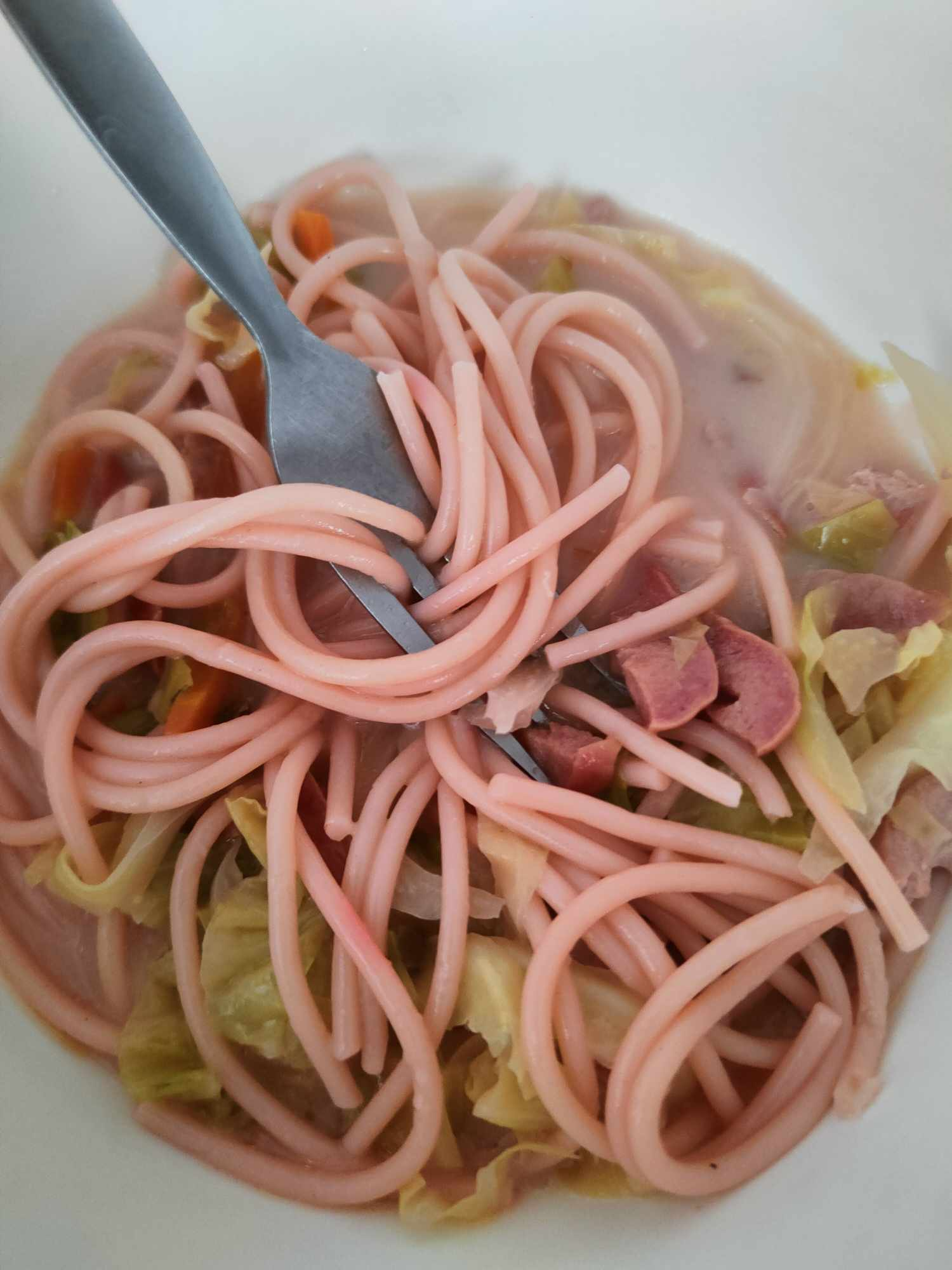
Spapas, a variant of sopas that uses spaghetti instead of elbow macaroni

Sopas is relatively easy to make. The meat is boiled first until tender. Sopas usually use chicken, but can also use beef or more rarely, diced pork or even turkey. It can also use leftover meat or processed meat like corned beef. It is usually removed once tender and shredded with the bones discarded, but some recipes skip this part. The stock is saved for later. Garlic and onions are then sautéed in butter briefly, before the stock is re-added and brought to a boil.

Various finely diced vegetables are added and allowed to soften. The most commonly used are carrots and celery. Roughly chopped cabbage, another common ingredient, is added just before the dish is completely cooked. Some variants may also use finely diced potatoes, green peas, green beans, or kinchay (Chinese celery). It is also common to exclude vegetables altogether.

The elbow macaroni is added last, along with finely diced hot dogs, Vienna sausages, or ham. The macaroni is cooked until al dente. It is spiced with salt and black pepper to taste. Once cooked, it is removed from the fire and evaporated milk is added. It is served hot or warm, and usually garnished with chopped scallions.

It is usually consumed immediately, as the macaroni will absorb the liquid and become soggy and bloated over time.

The steps may vary. Some versions boil the macaroni throughout, resulting in a soft mushy texture. Others do not de-bone or shred the meat, and may brown it beforehand by sautéing it with the garlic and onions. Others also prepare the dish faster by using store-bought bouillon cubes rather than prepare the stock.

A distinct cheap version of the dish is corned beef sopas, which uses corned beef in place of chicken. Its preparation is identical to classic versions, although it does not need to be boiled beforehand.

== See also ==
- List of soups
- Arroz caldo
- Filipino spaghetti
- Macaroni and cheese
- Macaroni salad
- Mami
