= Corned beef =

Salt-cured beef product

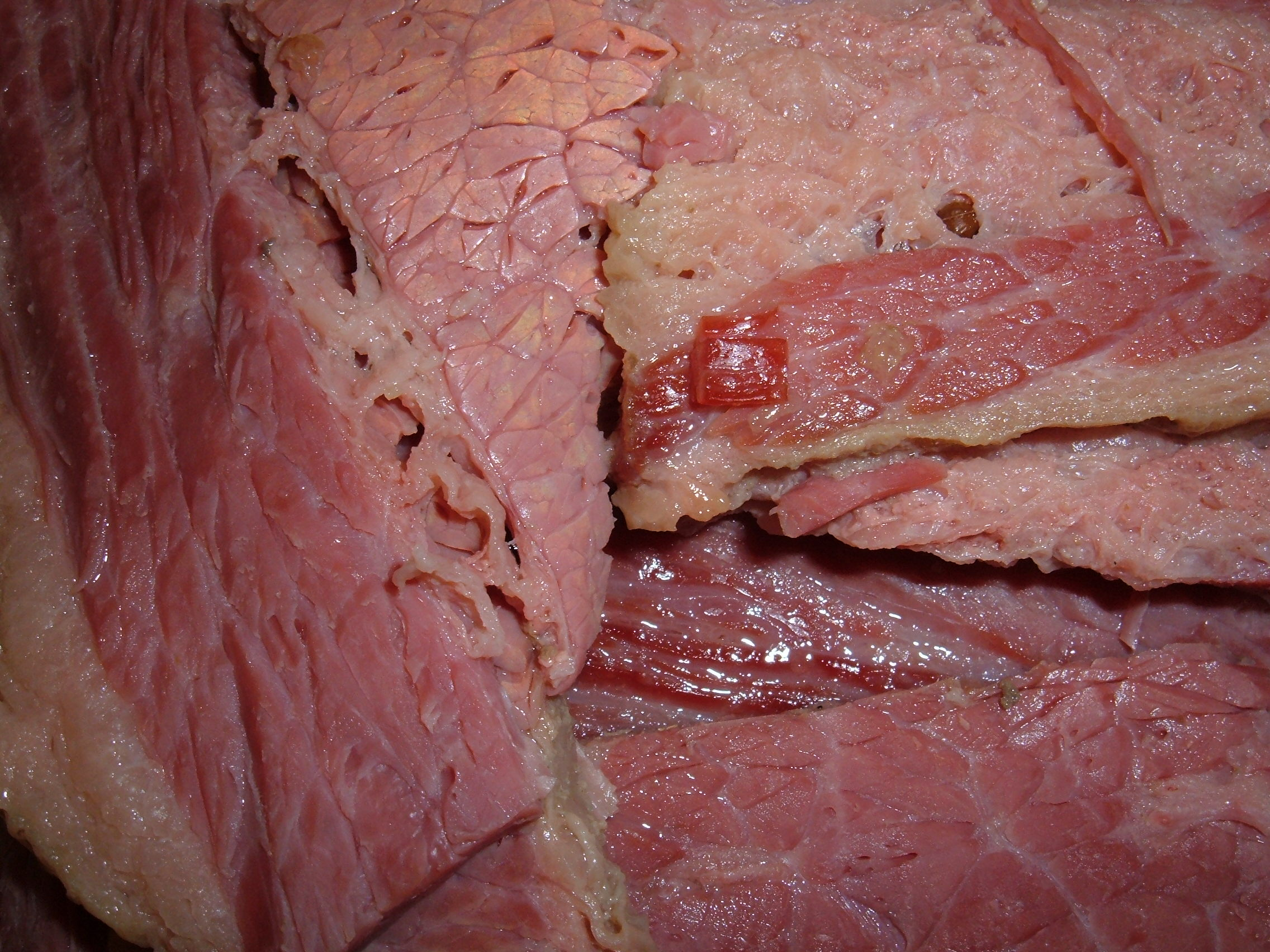
- Cooked corned beef
- Alternative names: Salt beef, bully beef (if canned)
- Main ingredients: Beef, salt, nitrates
- Variations: Adding sugar and spices

Corned beef (called salt beef in Commonwealth countries) is a salt-cured piece of beef. The term comes from the treatment of the meat with large-grained rock salt, also called "corns" of salt. Sometimes, sugar and spices are added to corned beef recipes. Corned beef is featured as an ingredient in many cuisines.

Most recipes include nitrates, which convert the natural myoglobin in beef to nitrosomyoglobin, giving it a pink color. Nitrates and nitrites reduce the risk of dangerous botulism during curing by inhibiting the growth of Clostridium botulinum bacteria spores, but react with amines in beef to form compounds that cause cancer. Beef cured without nitrates has a gray color and is sometimes called "New England corned beef".

Tinned corned beef, alongside salt pork and hardtack, was a standard ration for many militaries and navies from the 17th through the early 20th centuries, including World War I and World War II, during which fresh meat was rationed. Corned beef remains popular worldwide as an ingredient in a variety of regional dishes and as a common part in modern field rations of various armed forces around the world.

== History ==
Although the exact origin of corned beef is unknown, it most likely came about when people began preserving meat through salt-curing. Evidence of its legacy is apparent in numerous cultures, including ancient Europe and the Middle East. The word corn derives from Old English and is used to describe any small, hard particles or grains. In the case of corned beef, the word may refer to the coarse, granular salts used to cure the beef. The word "corned" may also refer to the corns of potassium nitrate, also known as saltpeter, which were formerly used to preserve the meat. The first mention of salted or corned beef in Ireland dates from the 12th century poem The Vision of MacConglinne.

=== Pre-20th century ===
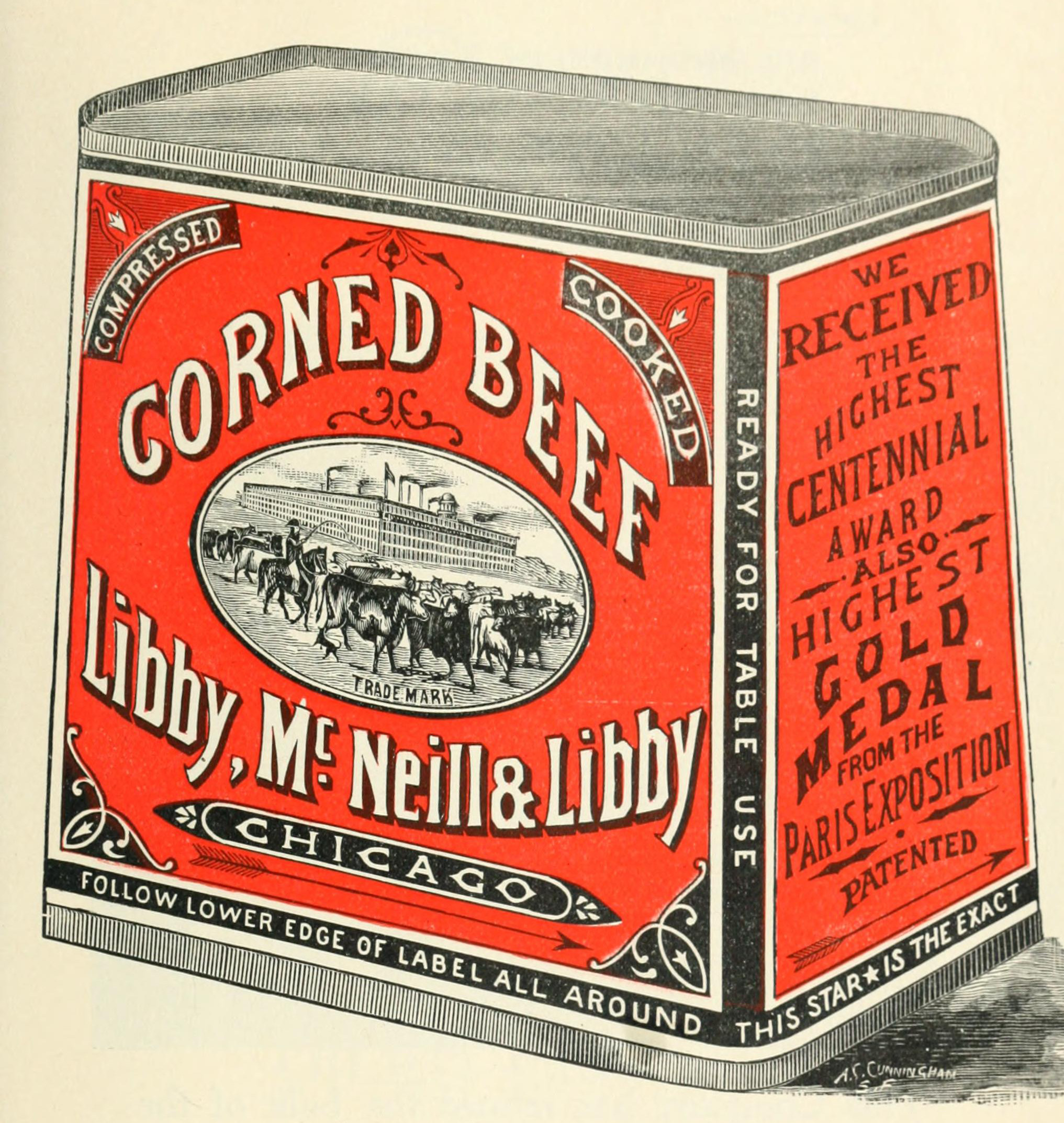
An 1898 illustration of a tin of corned beef produced by Libby's

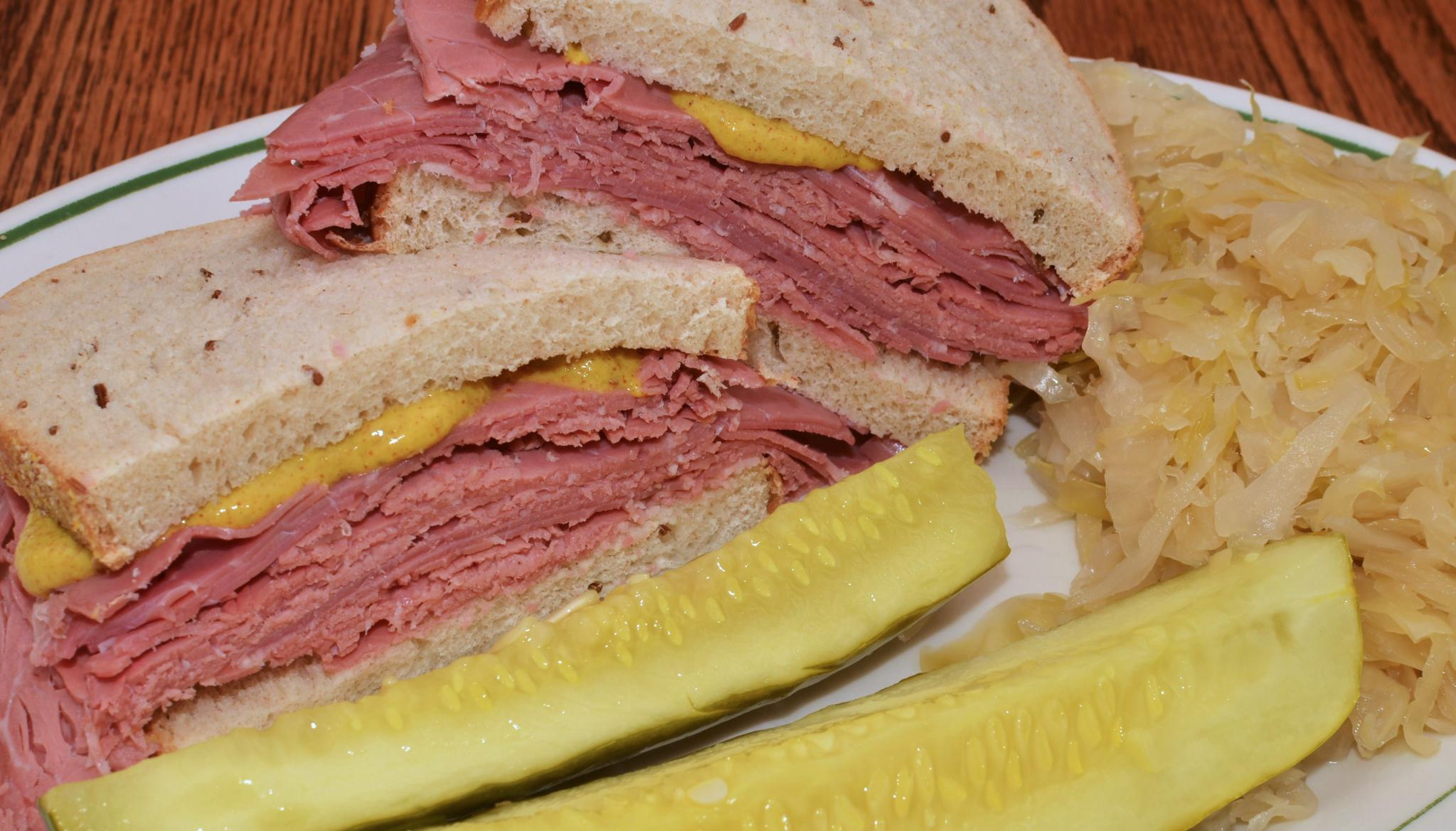
A corned beef sandwich served in a diner

Although the practice of curing beef existed across the globe since the period of classical antiquity, the industrial production of corned beef started in the British Isles during the British Agricultural Revolution. Corned beef sourced from cattle reared in Ireland and Scotland was used extensively for civilian and military consumption throughout the British Empire beginning from the 17th century onwards due to its non-perishable nature. Irish and Scottish corned beef was also sold to the French West Indies, where it was used to feed both settlers and slaves. Industrial processes in the British Isles for producing corned beef during the 17th century did not distinguish different cuts of beef beyond the tough and undesirable parts of the cow such as the beef shank and neck. Instead, the grading was done by sorting all cuts of beef by weight into "small beef", "cargo beef" and "best mess beef", with the first being considered the worst and the last the best. "Small beef" and "cargo beef" cuts were most commonly traded to the French, while "best mess beef" were frequently intended for sale and consumption in markets throughout the British Empire.

Ireland produced a significant portion of corned beef consumed in the British Empire during the early modern period, using cattle reared locally and salt imported from the Iberian Peninsula and southern France. Irish port cities, such as Dublin, Belfast and Cork, became home to large-scale beef curing and packing industries, with Cork alone producing half of Ireland's annual beef exports in 1668. Although the consumption of corned beef carried no significant negative connotations in Europe, in European colonies in the Americas it was frequently looked upon with disdain due to being primarily consumed by poor people and slaves. American social theorist Jeremy Rifkin noted the sociopolitical effect of corned beef in the British Isles during the early modern period in his 1992 book Beyond Beef: The Rise and Fall of the Cattle Culture:

The British enclosure movement had displaced thousands of rural English families, creating a cheap new labour pool to fill the unskilled jobs in the industrial factories of London, Leeds, Manchester, and Bristol. Shortages of foodstuffs and rising prices were fueling discontent among the new working class and middle class of the cities, threatening open rebellion. British officials and entrepreneurs quieted the masses with Scottish and Irish beef. Historians of the period point out that were it not for the Celtic pasturelands of Scotland and Ireland, it might well have proved impossible to quell the growing unrest of the British working class during the critical decades of British industrial expansion.

Despite being a major producer of corned beef, the majority of the Irish population during this period, native tenant farmers, consumed relatively little meat in their diets. This was due to a variety of factors, including the high costs of buying meat in Ireland and the ownership of the majority of Irish farms by Anglo-Irish landowners, who marked most of the corned beef produced using their cattle for export. The level of meat, including corned beef, present in the Irish diet of the period decreased in areas away from major centres for corned beef production, such as Northern Ireland, while increasing in areas such as County Cork. The majority of meat consumed by working-class Irish Catholics consisted of cheap products such as salt pork, with bacon and cabbage quickly becoming one of the most common meals in Irish cuisine.

=== 20th century to present ===
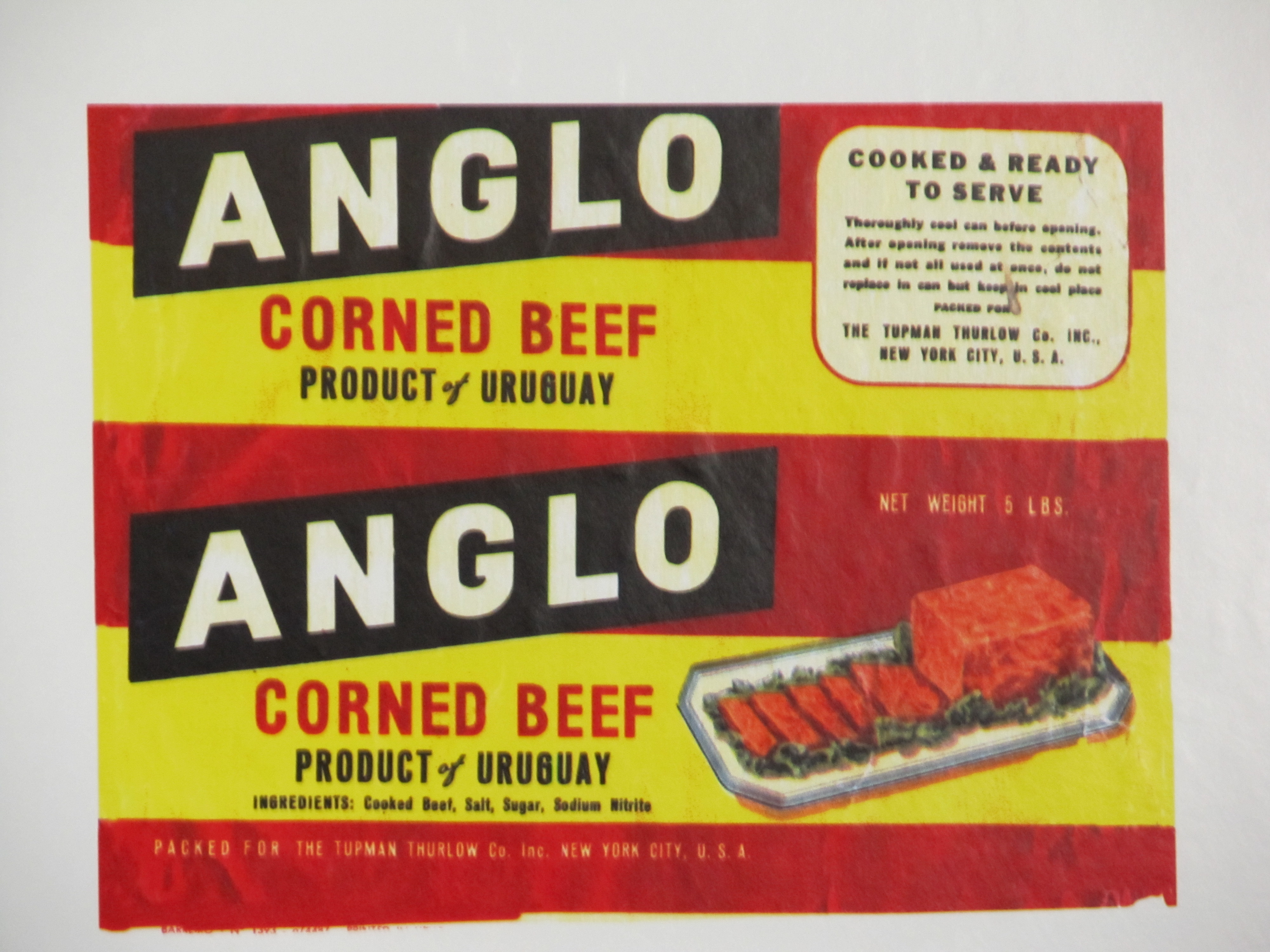
Label of a can of corned beef produced in Uruguay

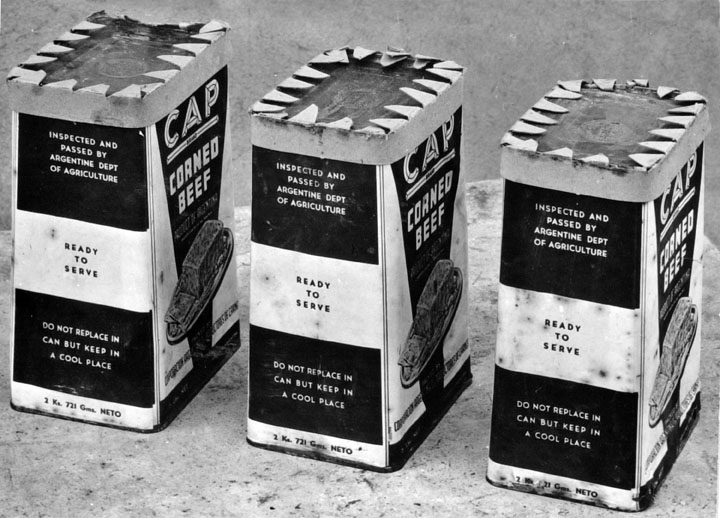
Canned corned beef produced in Argentina for export to New Zealand, 1946

Corned beef became a less important commodity in the 19th century Atlantic world, due in part to the abolition of slavery. Corned beef production and its canned form remained an important food source during World War II. Much of the canned corned beef was produced by the Frigorífico Anglo in Fray Bentos, Uruguay, with over 16 million cans exported in 1943. Today significant amounts of the global canned corned beef supply comes from South America. Approximately 80% of the global canned corned beef supply originates in Brazil.

== Nutrition and health effects ==
Corned beef is a type of processed red meat. Red meat is a good source of protein, iron, zinc, and vitamins B1, B2, B6, and B12. According to the International Agency for Research on Cancer (IARC), processed meat causes cancer, particularly colorectal cancer. Strong evidence also links processed meat with higher risks of cardiovascular disease and type 2 diabetes. The World Cancer Research Fund recommends minimizing consumption of processed meats.

== Cultural associations ==
In North America, corned beef dishes are associated with traditional Irish cuisine, particularly on Saint Patrick's Day. Corned beef remained less popular in Ireland in comparison to other meat, such as bacon, probably due to the high price of beef.

Mark Kurlansky, in his book Salt, states that the Irish produced a salted beef around the Middle Ages that was the "forerunner of what today is known as Irish corned beef" and in the 17th century, the English named the Irish salted beef "corned beef".

Before the wave of 19th century Irish immigration to the United States, many ethnic Irish immigrants did not consume corned beef dishes. The popularity of corned beef compared to back bacon among the Irish immigrant population may have been due to corned beef being considered a luxury product in their native land, while it was cheap and readily available in the United States.

The Jewish population produced similar corned beef brisket, also smoking it into pastrami. Irish immigrants often purchased corned beef from Jewish butchers.

Canned corned beef has long been one of the standard meals included in military field ration packs globally, due to its simplicity and instant preparation. One example is the American Meal, Ready-to-Eat (MRE) pack. Astronaut John Young sneaked a contraband corned beef sandwich on board Gemini 3, hiding it in a pocket of his spacesuit.

== Regions ==
=== Ireland ===
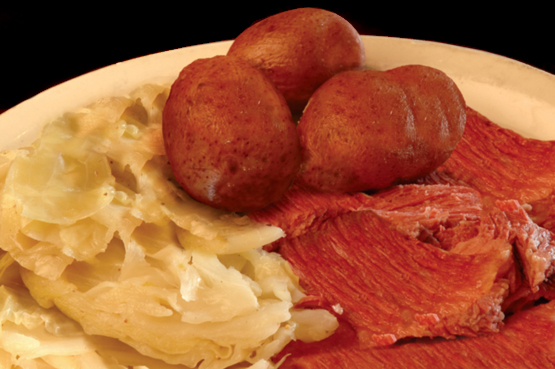
Corned beef dinner, with potatoes and cabbage, Ireland

The appearance of corned beef in Irish cuisine dates to the 12th century in the poem Aislinge Meic Con Glinne or The Vision of MacConglinne. Within the text, it is described as a delicacy a king uses to purge himself of the "demon of gluttony". Cattle, valued as a bartering tool, were only eaten when no longer able to provide milk or to work. The corned beef as described in this text was a rare and valued dish, given the value and position of cattle within the culture, as well as the expense of salt, and was unrelated to the corned beef eaten today.

=== United Kingdom ===
In the British military, corned beef has been historically served finely minced and canned in the form of bully beef. The name is taken from the dish soup and bouilli; as the dish was stored canned on merchant ships and in the Royal Navy over the 19th century, sailors called the meat portion bully beef and extended the expression to all canned meats. This would include corned beef, as by 1862 "very good corned beef" – in the opinion of Lord Clarence Paget – had replaced "old mahogany" on naval ships. English soldiers also used the term "bully beef" for their tinned meat ration, with corned beef becoming a staple of military rations by the Ashanti War of 1873–1874.

During the Anglo-Zulu War, corned beef was being used extensively with over 500 tons being sent to South Africa in six months. During the Battle of Isandlwana, British troops reportedly discarded thousands of tins of bully beef into the Buffalo river to lighten their retreat.

In 1875, Arthur Libby and W. J. Wilson had obtained a patent for a rectangular can with tapered sides allowing the can's contents "to slide out in one piece, so as to be readily sliced as desired". The meat was precooked to reduce shrinkage and, as described in another patent, packed into the can under pressure "to remove the air and all superfluous moisture", hence the compressed corned beef description on the label. The patents were declared void in 1881 when prior art was shown to exist, allowing other packing houses to produce similar cans.

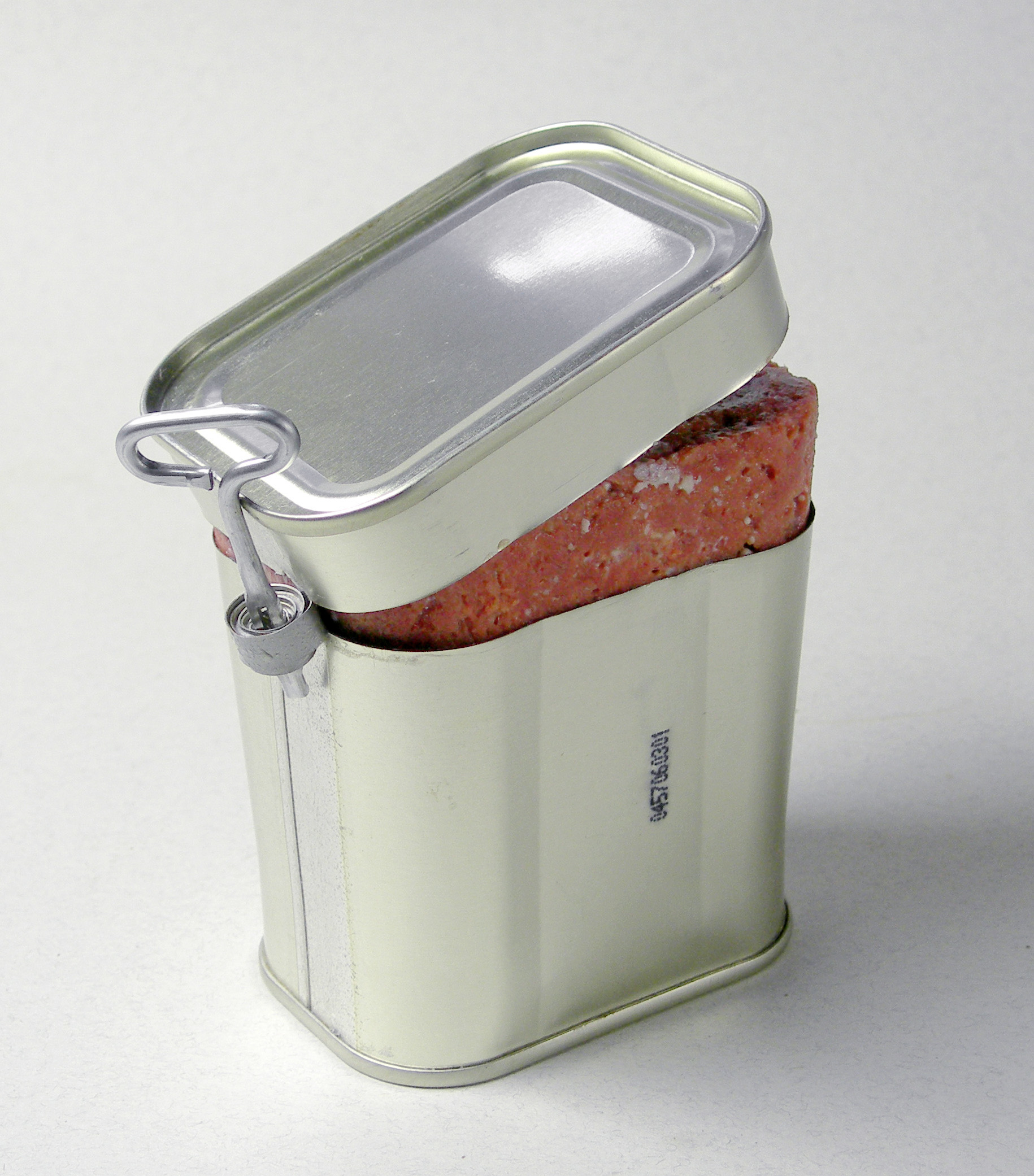
Canned British Army bully beef

Around the time of the Second Boer War and World War I bully beef began being packaged in rectangular key-open cans. It was reported that in 1879 over 4,400 tons of preserved beef had been exported to England by Libby, McNeil and Libby, with over 260 tons sent to the troops in South Africa.

Bully beef would serve as the main field ration of the British Army from at least the South African War up until World War II. In February 2009, the British Defence Equipment and Support announced that they would be phasing out bully beef from ration packs as part of the introduction of the new Multi-Climate Ration Packs; this change was later reversed due to mass backlash.

=== United States and Canada ===
In the United States and Canada, corned beef is typically available in two forms: a cut of beef (usually brisket, but sometimes round or silverside) cured or pickled in a seasoned brine, or cooked and canned. In both the United States and Canada, corned beef is sold in cans in minced form.

Corned beef hashed with potatoes served with eggs is a common breakfast dish in the United States of America.

Corned beef is often purchased ready to eat in Jewish delicatessens. It is the key ingredient in the grilled Reuben sandwich, consisting of corned beef, Swiss cheese, sauerkraut, and Thousand Island or Russian dressing on rye bread. Smoking corned beef, typically with a generally similar spice mix, produces smoked meat (or "smoked beef") such as pastrami or Montreal-style smoked meat.

In Newfoundland and Labrador, corned beef is sold in buckets of brine and known specifically as "salt beef". It is a staple product culturally in Newfoundland and Labrador, providing a source of meat during their long winters. It is commonly eaten in Newfoundland and Labrador as part of the local Jiggs dinner. It has been used in different meals locally, such as a Jiggs dinner poutine dish.

==== Saint Patrick's Day ====
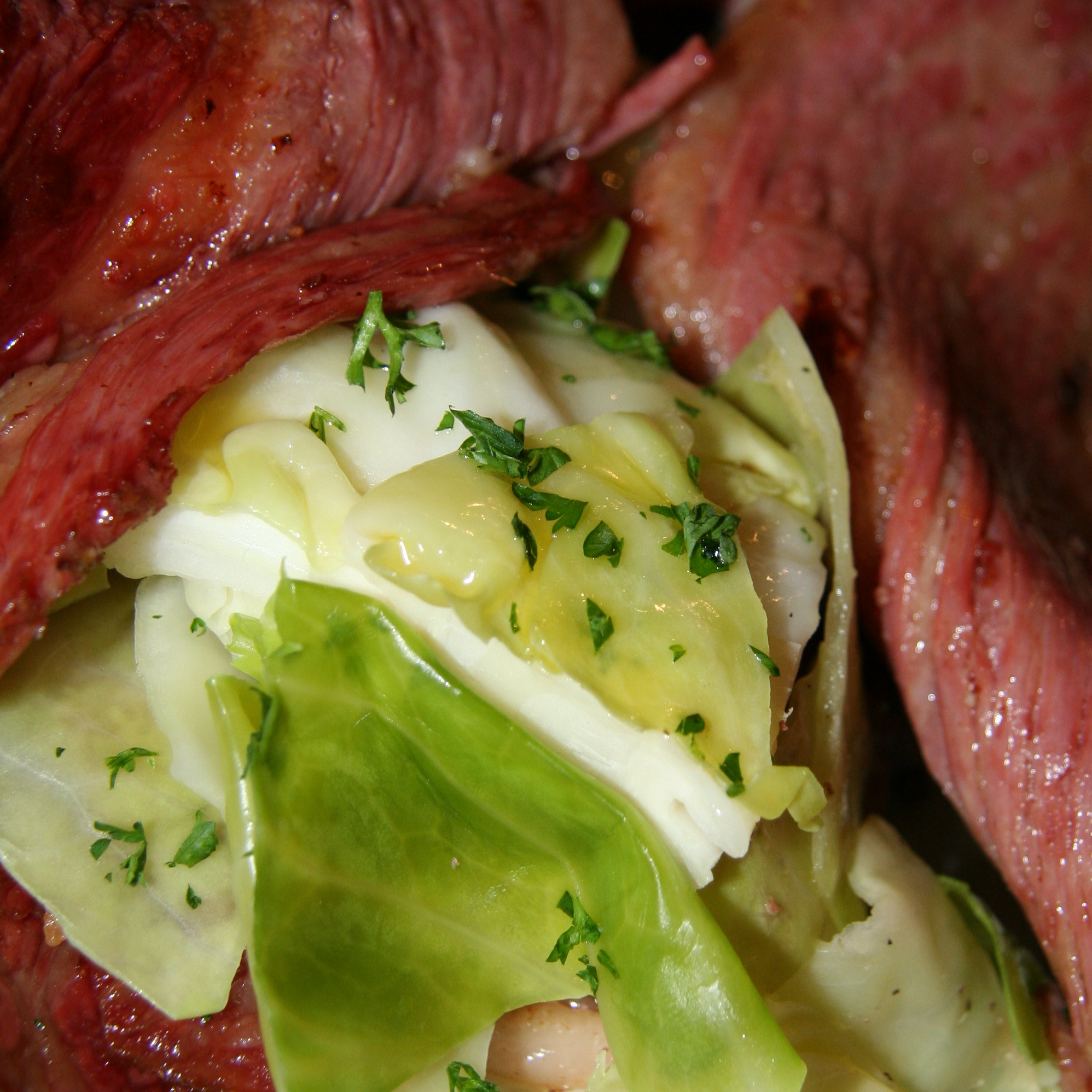
Corned beef and cabbage

In the United States, consumption of corned beef is often associated with Saint Patrick's Day. Corned beef is not an Irish national dish, and the connection with Saint Patrick's Day specifically originates as part of Irish-American culture, and is often part of their celebrations in North America.

Corned beef was used as a substitute for bacon by Irish immigrants in the late 19th century. Corned beef and cabbage is the Irish-American variant of the Irish dish of bacon and cabbage. A similar dish is the New England boiled dinner, consisting of corned beef, cabbage, and root vegetables such as carrots, turnips, and potatoes, which is popular in New England and another similar dish, Jiggs dinner, is popular in parts of Atlantic Canada.

=== Caribbean ===
Multiple Caribbean nations have their own varied versions of canned corned beef as a dish, common in Puerto Rico, Jamaica, Barbados, and elsewhere.

In Puerto Rico and the Puerto Rican diaspora in the United States, canned corned beef was a cheap alternative for the working class. Typically the dish consisting of sofrito, plantains, potatoes, and or canned corn was considered a "struggle meal" but with the recent rise in beef prices the dish is gaining popularity especially in areas with large Puerto Rican diaspora communities.

=== Uruguay ===
Production of corned beef began in Fray Bentos in 1873, sold to Britain under the name Fray Bentos. In 1943 alone, 16 million tins of corned beef were shipped out from Fray Bentos, the vast majority used to power the Allied war effort. It is not commonly consumed domestically though.

=== Israel ===
In Israel, a canned corned beef called Loof (לוף) was the traditional field ration of the Israel Defense Forces until the product's discontinuation in 2011. The name Loof derives from "a colloquially corrupt short form of 'meatloaf.'" Loof was developed by the IDF in the late 1940s as a kosher form of bully beef, while similar canned meats had earlier been an important component of relief packages sent to Europe and Palestine by Jewish organizations such as Hadassah.

=== Polynesia ===
In Fiji, Samoa, and Tonga, colonialism by western powers brought with them something that would change Polynesian diets—canned goods, including the highly prized corned beef. Natural disasters brought in food aid from New Zealand, Australia, and the US, then world wars in the mid-20th century, foreign foods became a bigger part of daily diets while retaining ancestral foods like taro and coconuts. Both wet salt-brined beef and canned corned beef are differentiated. In Samoa, brined povi masima (lit. 'salted beef') or canned pīsupo (lit. "pea soup", general term for canned foods). In Tonga, corned (wet brine) masima or canned meats kapa are typical.

=== China ===
Pingyao beef (平遥牛肉) a specialty from Shanxi, dates back to the Ming dynasty. The beef is dry-rubbed with salt, then slowly braised. It became a tribute item to the imperial court during the Qing dynasty and remains a protected geographical indication product.

Corned beef has also become a common dish in Hong Kong cuisine, though it has been heavily adapted in style and preparation to fit local tastes. It is often served with other "Western" fusion cuisine at cha chaan teng and other cheap restaurants catering to locals.

=== Philippines ===
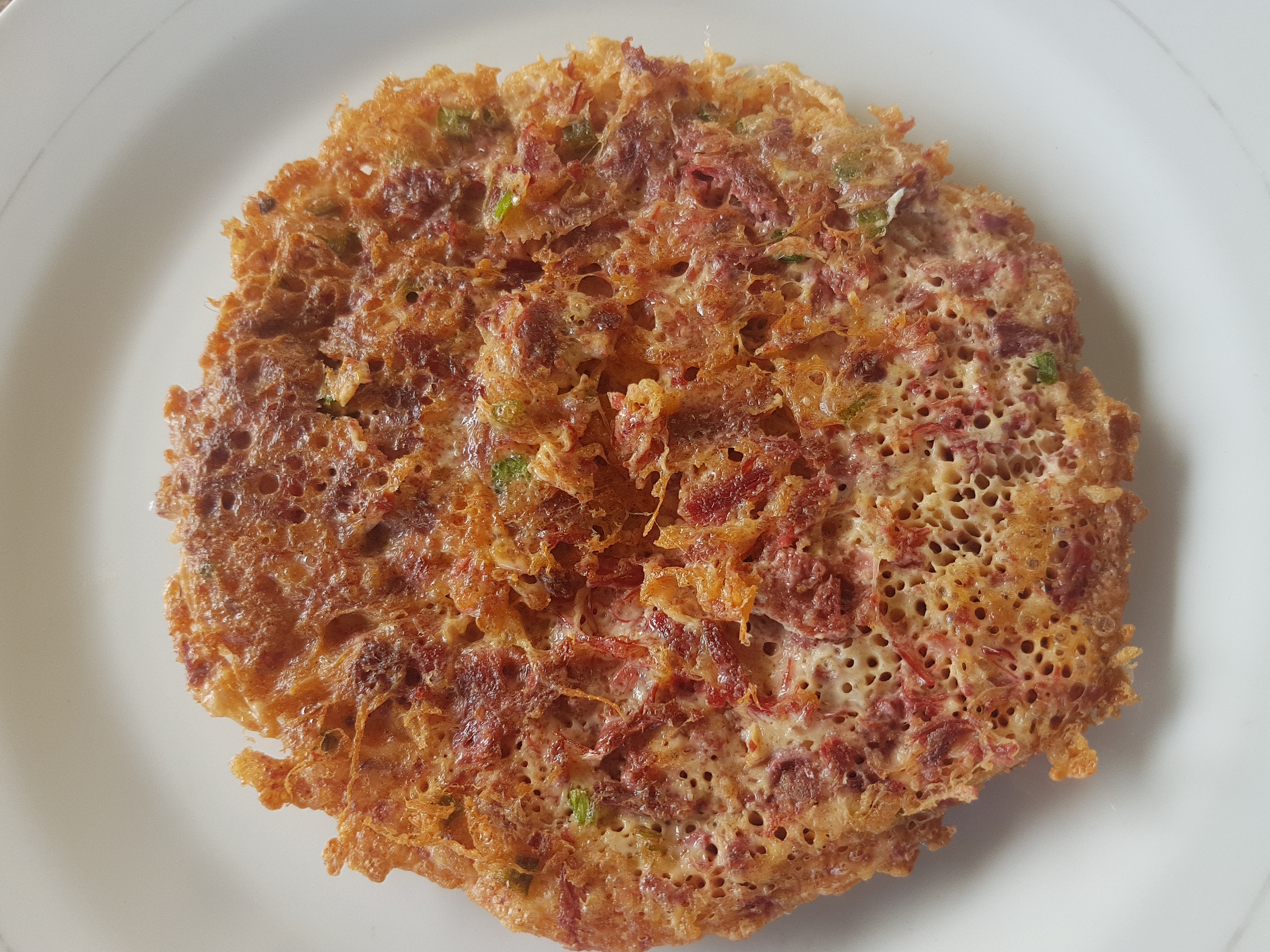
Tortang carne norte, a corned beef omelette from the Philippines

Along with other canned meats, canned corned beef is a popular breakfast staple in the Philippines. Corned beef is also known as carne norte (alternative spelling: karne norte) locally, literally translating to "northern meat" in Spanish; the term refers to Americans, whom Filipinos then called norteamericanos, as the rest of Spain's colonies would differentiate between norteamericano (Canadian, American, Mexicano), centroamericano (Nicaragüense, Costarricense, et al.), and sudamericano (Colombiano, Equatoriano, Paraguayo, et al.). The Spanish colonial distinction of norteamericano was land north of the Viceroy's Road (Camino de Virreyes) used to transport goods from the Manila Galleon landing in the port of Acapulco overland for Havana via the port of Veracruz (and not the Río Grande in Texas), while centroamericano meant Spanish possessions south of Mexico City.

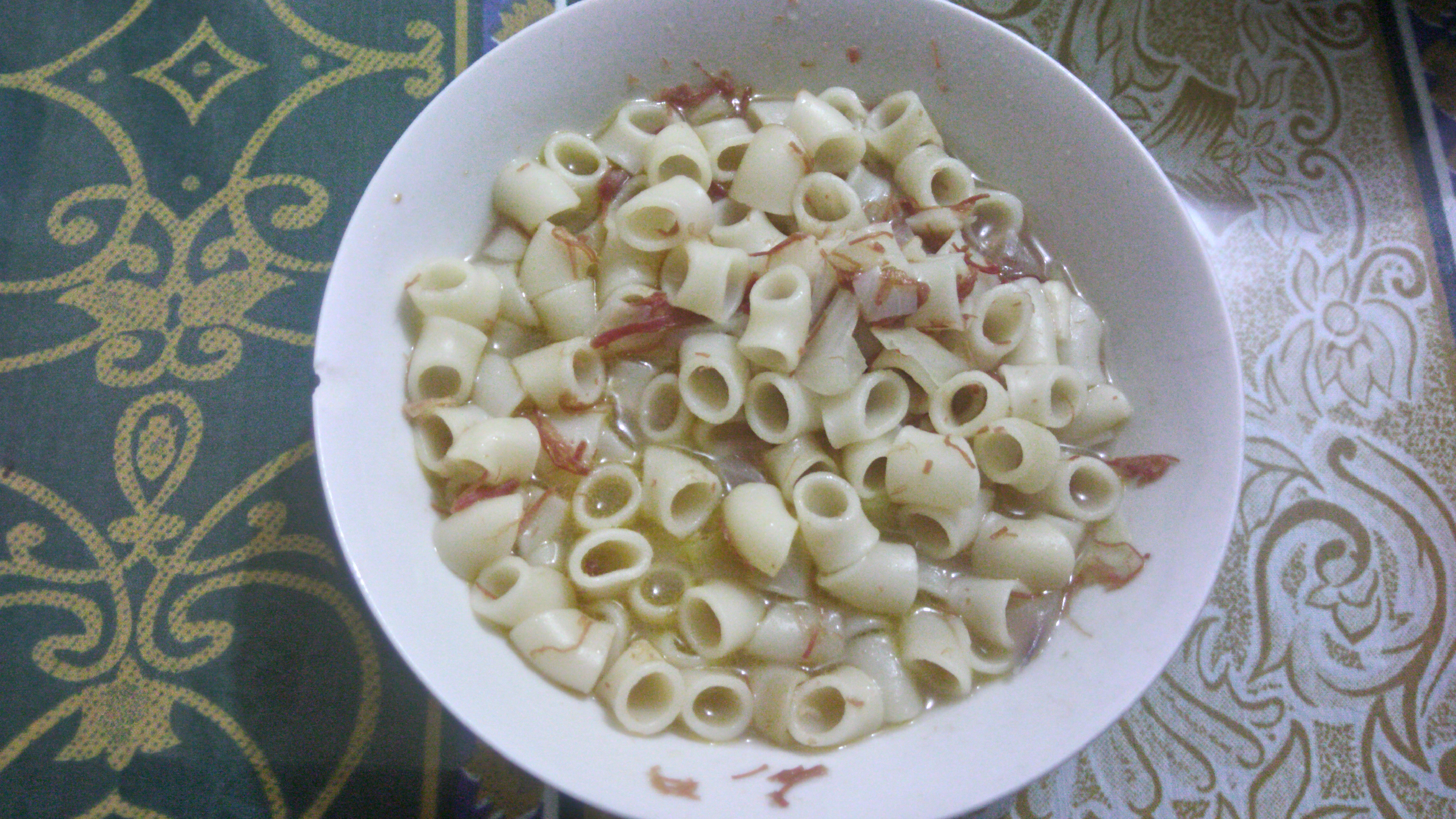
Filipino sopas (macaroni soup) with corned beef

Corned beef, especially the Libby's brand, first became popular during the American colonial period of the Philippines (1901–1941) among the wealthy as a luxury food; they were advertised serving the corned beef cold and straight-from-the-can on to a bed of rice, or as patties in between bread. During World War II (1942–1945), American soldiers brought for themselves, and airdropped from the skies the same corned beef; it was a life-or-death commodity since the Japanese Imperial Army forcibly controlled all food in an effort to subvert any resistance against them.

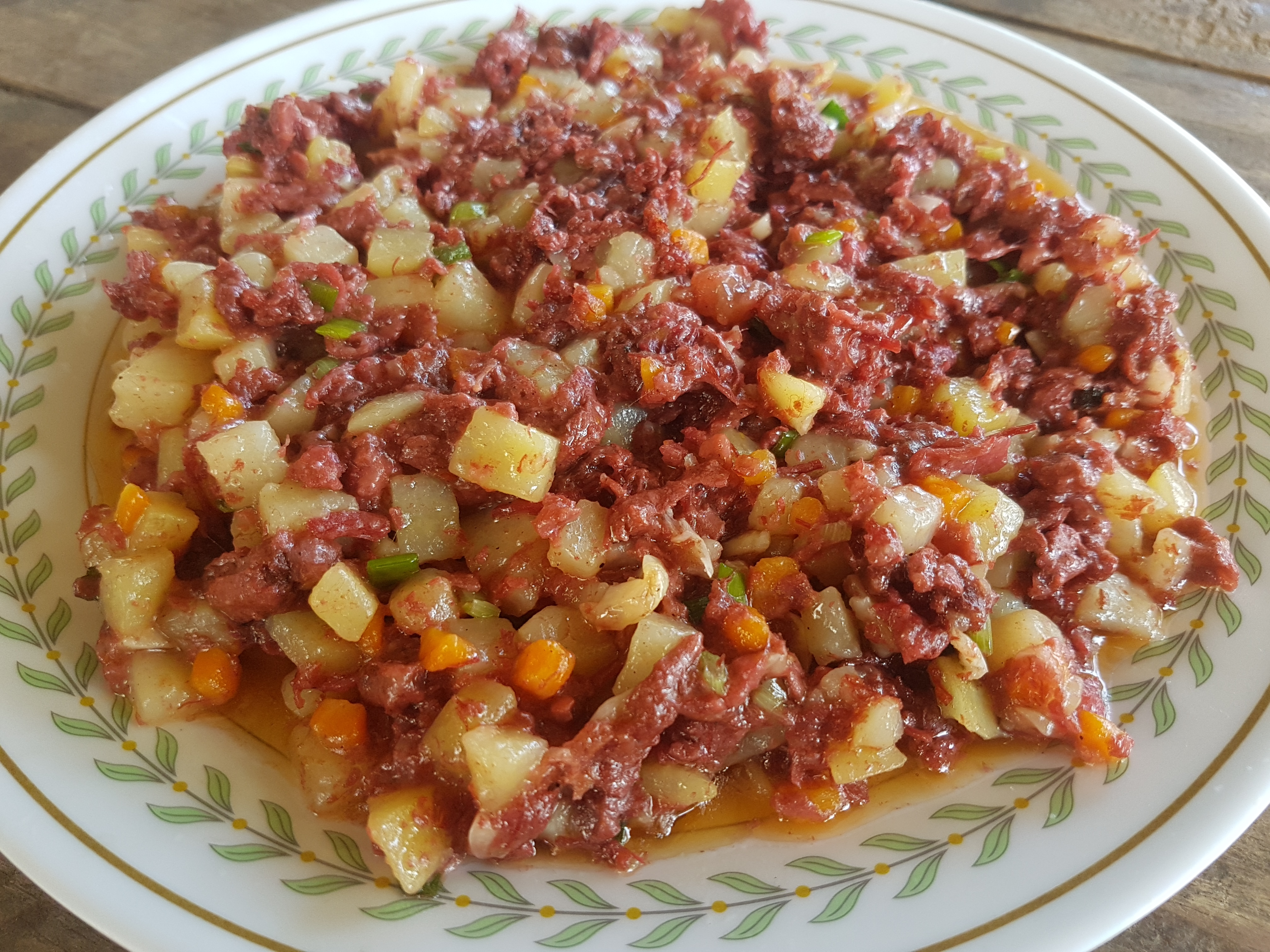
Carne norte guisado of the Philippines with potatoes, onions, garlic, carrots, and tomatoes; it is eaten with white rice or bread.

After the war (1946 to present), corned beef gained far more popularity. It remains a staple in balikbayan boxes and on Filipino breakfast tables. The ordinary Filipino can afford them, and many brands have sprung up, including those manufactured by Century Pacific Food, CDO Foodsphere and San Miguel Food and Beverage, which are wholly owned by Filipinos and locally manufactured.

Philippine corned beef is typically made from shredded beef or buffalo meat, and is almost exclusively sold in cans. It is boiled, shredded, canned, and sold in supermarkets and grocery stores for mass consumption. It is usually served as the breakfast combination called "corned beef silóg", in which corned beef is cooked as carne norte guisado (fried, mixed with onions, garlic, and often, finely cubed potatoes, carrots, tomatoes, and/or cabbage), with a side of sinangág (garlic fried rice), and a fried egg. Another common way to eat corned beef is tortang carne norte (or corned beef omelette), in which corned beef is mixed with beaten egg and fried. Corned beef is also used as a cheap meat ingredient in dishes like sopas and sinigang.

== See also ==
- Cured fish
- Curing salt
- Potted meat – Preserving food in fat
