= Bacon and cabbage =

Irish dish

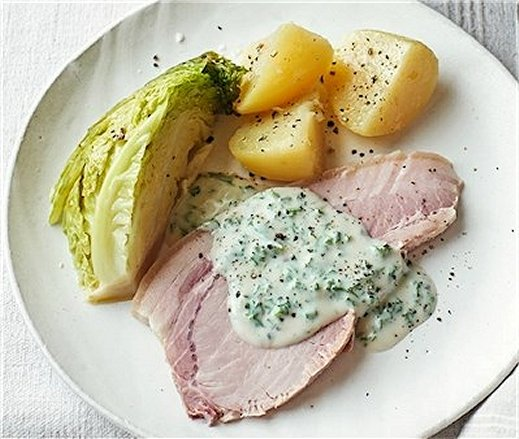
- Course: Main
- Place of origin: Ireland
- Main ingredients: Bacon (green back or smoked) and cabbage
- Variations: Corned beef and cabbage, pork ribs and cabbage, breast bones and cabbage

Bacon and cabbage (Irish: bagún agus cabáiste) is a dish especially associated with Ireland. The dish consists of sliced back bacon boiled with cabbage served with potatoes. Smoked bacon is sometimes used. The dish is served with the bacon sliced, and with some of the boiling juices added. Another common accompaniment to the dish is white sauce, which consists of flour, butter and milk, sometimes with a flavouring of some sort (often parsley).

The dish has been known since Roman times, and was also associated with England.

== Bacon use ==
The bacon used for the meal can vary somewhat depending on individual preference. Usually a brined "shoulder butt" or "picnic shoulder" is used for the recipe, but other cuts of bacon are sometimes preferred. However, the bacon used is almost always cured. The traditional curing process is a long process which involves storing the bacon in salt; however, in modern times, mass-produced bacon is cured using brine which is less frequently injected into the meat to speed up the process. The bacon can also be smoked, which adds a depth of flavour that some people prefer. In Ireland, one can also purchase what is known as "home-cured" or "hard-cured", which is bacon cured over a long period and then stored for another long spell, wrapped in paper. This makes the bacon very salty, hard in texture and yellowish in colour.

== History ==
Historically, this dish originated in Ireland and was common fare in Irish homes because the ingredients were readily available as many families grew their own vegetables and reared their own pigs. It was considered nourishing and satisfying. The dish continues to be a very common meal in Ireland.

== Descendants ==
=== Corned beef and cabbage ===
In the mid-to-late 19th century, Irish immigrants to the United States began substituting the bacon with corned beef when making the dish, thereby creating corned beef and cabbage. Like the original, the dish sometimes includes additional vegetables (especially carrots and potatoes); this also gives it a certain similarity to the New England boiled dinner, which almost invariably contains a mixture of root vegetables along with boiled meat and cabbage.

The term "corned" comes from the large grains of salt used to cure beef, which was historically called "corns" of salt. Corned beef and cabbage remains a popular food in some areas of the United States and Ireland.

=== Jiggs dinner ===
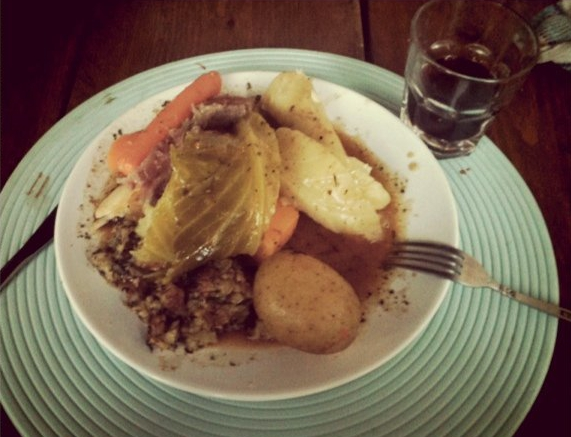
Jiggs dinner

On the island of Newfoundland, where the Irish and the English made up a large proportion of the founding settlers, this, and the similar English boiled beef, gave rise to a boiled dinner featuring salted beef called Jiggs dinner.

== Other references ==
In his 1963 book, Strong Tea, John B. Keane writes:

"Lest the wrong impression be given, let me say at once that the type of bacon I have in mind is home cured. It has been hanging from the ceiling for months, and when you cut a chunk from it there is the faintest golden tinges about its attractive shapeliness. When this type of bacon is boiling with its old colleague, white cabbage, there is a gurgle from the pot that would tear the heart out of a hungry man."

== See also ==
- List of cabbage dishes
- List of Irish dishes
- Cassoeula
- Stegt flæsk
