= Macaroni soup =

Food

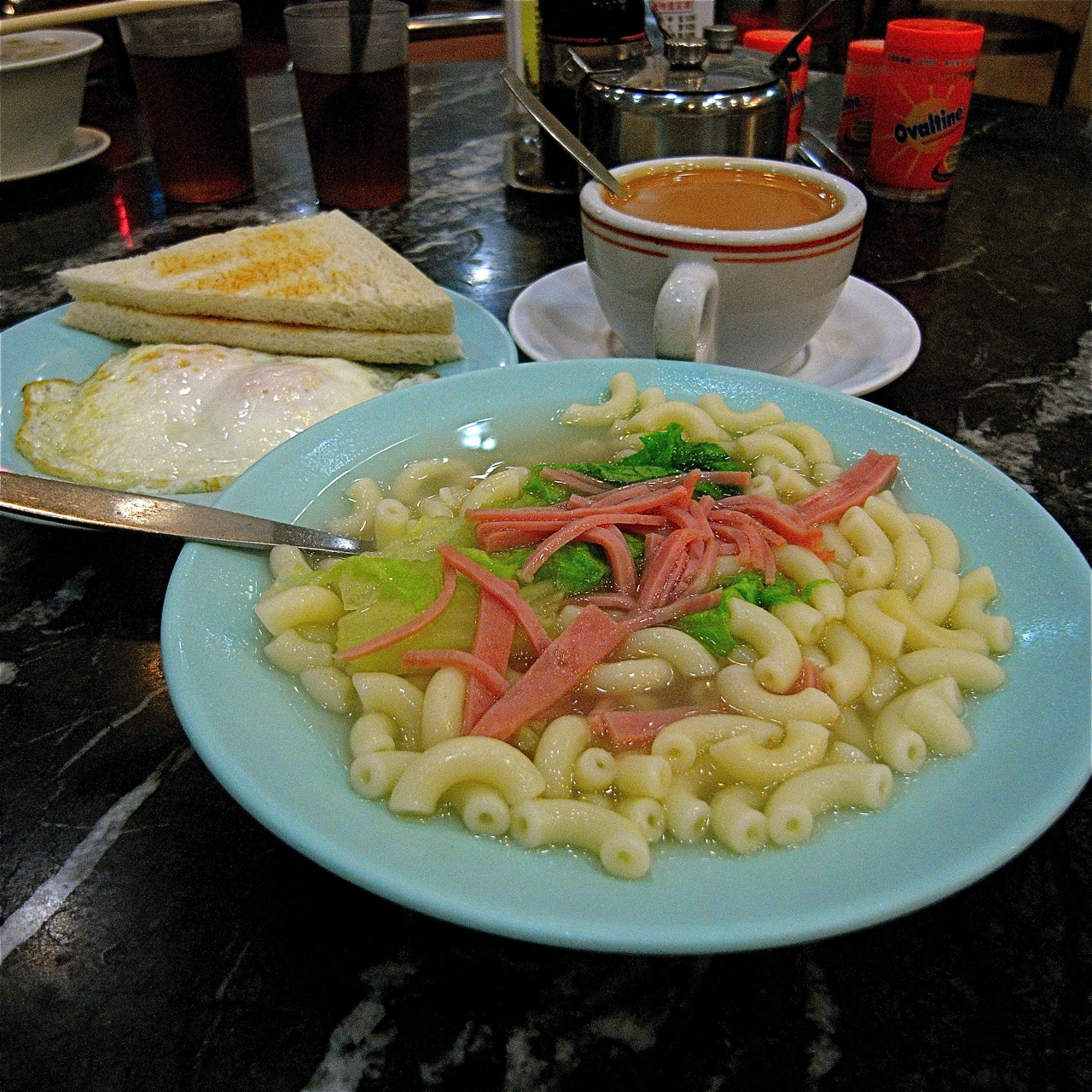
- Macaroni soup in Hong Kong
- Type: Soup
- Main ingredients: Macaroni

Macaroni soup is soup that includes macaroni. The food was included in Mrs. Beeton's Book of Household Management, where the connection with Italy is mentioned and the dish includes Parmesan cheese. In the early 19th century, macaroni soup was one of the most common dishes in Italian inns.

The soup was discussed as a food to improve the health of poor miners. Weeds can be used in macaroni soup in times of poverty to provide vitamins and minerals. Due to its inexpensive nature, it is often part of the menu in institutions such as schools, hospitals and prisons. Protein such as soya beans can be added to provide nutrition. It was included in a cookbook for schools in 1896. One book suggests using it as a food to comfort distressed mental patients. The dish was served as part of the menu for students in Memorial Hall, Harvard, in 1882, where their food was described as looking better than it tastes.

In the Philippines, a common macaroni soup is known simply as sopas ('soup' in Tagalog). It originated from the American chicken noodle soup. It is made with macaroni, various vegetables and meat (usually chicken), with added evaporated milk. It is regarded as a comfort food and commonly served during cold days or to sick people.

The soup is also known in Indonesia and Malaysia, where it is sometimes served with chicken balls. In Indonesia, macaroni soup is an easy dish often served for children and during sahur meals in Ramadan.

Macaroni in soup is also commonly found in Hong Kong, especially in cha chaan teng (Hong Kong–style cafes). McDonald's in Hong Kong includes the dish in its breakfast menu.
