= Boiled beef =

Beef boiled with vegetables

Boiled beef is a historic dish eaten during the Georgian era in England. It was also popular in the early 19th century in the US. Its popularity has decreased in recent years. Traditionally, cheaper cuts of meat were used; boiling makes the meat more tender than roasting. It was usually cooked with onions and served with carrots and boiled potatoes. It was not uncommon for the beef to be salted in a brine for a few days, then soaked overnight to remove excess salt before it was boiled. In other parts of England, cabbage replaced carrots.

This dish gave rise to the old Cockney song “Boiled Beef and Carrots” which used to be sung in some East London pubs when they had a pianist and singsong night.

Boiled beef is also a traditional Jewish dish served in many homes and Jewish delis. It is usually flank steak boiled and served with vegetables, broth, and sometimes matzo balls.
