= List of rice dishes =

This is a list of rice dishes from all over the world, arranged alphabetically. Rice is the seed of the monocot plants Oryza sativa (Asian rice) or Oryza glaberrima (African rice). As a cereal grain, it is the most widely consumed staple food for a large part of the world's human population, especially in Asia, Africa and the West Indies. It is the grain with the second-highest worldwide production, after maize (corn), according to data for 2010.

== List of rice dishes ==
Name	Image	Origin	Description
Akhni		Bangladesh	Mixed rice and meat dish, a variant of pilaf.
Akki rotti		India	"Rice bread", a rice-based breakfast item unique to the state of Karnataka, India
Albaloo polo		Iran	Sour (morello) cherries in pilaf rice, usually made with spices like saffron and advieh.
American fried rice (Thai)		Thailand	This is a dish from Thai cuisine where the rice is fried with tomato ketchup and raisins
Ampaw		Philippines	Filipino sweet puffed rice cake. It is traditionally made with sun-dried leftover cooked white rice that is fried and coated with syrup.
Appam		India	Appam is a type of pancake, originating from South India, made with fermented rice batter and coconut milk. A common delicacy in Tamil Nadu, Sri Lanka and Kerala.
Arancini		Italy (Sicily)	Breaded and deep fried stuffed rice balls
Arem-arem		Indonesia	Made of compressed rice cake in the form of a cylinder wrapped inside a banana leaf, filled with diced vegetables, tempeh or oncom, sometimes also filled with minced meat or abon (beef floss), and eaten as snack.
Arroz caldo		Philippines	Thin rice porridge cooked with chicken, ginger, onions and garnished with spring onions, toasted garlic and calamansi
Arroz chaufa		Peru	"Chow fun rice" Chinese fried rice with a Peruvian twist
Arroz borracho		Puerto Rico	Rice cooked with sazón, sofrito, chickpeas, ground meat, and beer.
Arroz con gandules		Puerto Rico	A part of the Puerto Rican gastronomy consisting of a combination of rice, pigeon peas, olives, capers, and pork, cooked in the same pot with Puerto Rican-style sofrito, spices and annatto oil.
Arroz con huevo frito		Central America and South America	Rice with fried egg
Arroz con maiz		Cuba and Puerto Rico	"Rice with corn", the dish is made in both Cuba and Puerto Rico. It's made with rice, corn, sausage, wine, annatto, tomatoes, sofrito and other ingredients.
Arroz con pollo		Spain	"Rice with chicken", the dish, which originated in Spain as a form of pilaf, is a staple throughout Latin America. It is a traditional dish of Latin America and the Caribbean, especially in Puerto Rico, Colombia, Venezuela, Ecuador, Panama, Peru, Cuba, Costa Rica, Honduras, the Dominican Republic, where it is called locrio de pollo, and Saint Martin, where it is called lokri or locreo.
Arroz de lisa (mullet rice)		Colombia, Caribbean region	Traditionally served in bijao leaf with cooked cassava, a triangle of costeño cheese and a sauce of suero atollabuey
Arròs negre		Spain	"Black rice", dish blackened with cuttlefish ink
Ayimolou		Togo	Dish made from rice and beans with sauce and meat, fish and/or eggs similar to waakye
Baghali polo		Iran	A rice dish prepared with lima beans and dill.
Balao-balao		Philippines	A Filipino condiment of made from fermented cooked rice and whole raw shrimp
Bannu Pulao		Pakistan	A traditional mixed rice dish from the Bannu District of Khyber Pakhtunkhwa, Pakistan. It is made with beef, rice, spices, and stock. The beef is cooked with bones and marrow, which gives the dish a rich and flavorful taste. The rice is cooked separately with ghee, salt, and whole spices. The dish is served with a garnish of onions, green chilies, and lemon wedges.
Bánh chưng		Vietnam	This is a cake-dish usually eaten on Tet, Vietnamese new year eve, which is pork in the center, mashed mung bean and rice wrapped in leaves.
Ba-wan		Taiwan	This is a savory snack food made from rice paste, meat, and usually shiitake mushrooms and bamboo shoots. It is often found at Taiwan night markets. Also called "rou-wan-zhi."
Bai pong moan		Cambodia	A rice and egg dish with several variations.
Baye baye		Philippines	A Filipino dish made from grated young coconut mixed with either newly harvested rice (pinipig) or corn and shaped into patties.
Bhakari		Maharashtra, India	A type of bread which is prepared by mixing rice dough and water and then heated dry or roasted on a type of flat vessel called tawa, mostly in the coastal districts of kokan region which includes palghar, thane, Mumbai, raigad, ratnagiri, sindhudurg of maharashtra and goa.
Bibimbap		Korea	Mixed vegetables on rice with egg or meat on top
Bibingka		Philippines	A rice cake usually eaten during Christmas. May be topped with cottage cheese, salted egg or freshly grated shredded young coconut meat.
Biko		Philippines	A sweet dish made of sticky rice cooked in coconut milk and sugar and topped with thick caramelized coconut syrup and latik
Binignit		Philippines	A Visayan dessert soup from the central Philippines. The dish is traditionally made with glutinous rice cooked in coconut milk with various slices of sabá bananas, taro, ube, and sweet potato, among other ingredients.
Biryani		Indian subcontinent	Preparation of spicy fried rice with meat, fish, chicken, and vegetables.
Bisi bele bath		India	A rice-based dish with its origins in the state of Karnataka, India. Bisi-bele-bhaath translates to hot lentil rice in the Kannada language. The traditional preparation of this dish is quite elaborate and involves the use of spicy masala, toor dal (a type of lentil) and vegetables. Spices like nutmeg and asafoetida, curry leaves and tamarind pulp used in its preparation contribute to the unique flavor and taste of this dish.
Black beans and rice		Cuba	A very popular side dish, or entrée if done right.
Bhaat		Indian subcontinent	Rice that has been cooked either by steaming or boiling.
Bhelpuri		Indian subcontinent	Bhelpuri is a savoury snack, originating from the Indian subcontinent, and is also a type of chaat. It is made of puffed rice, vegetables and a tangy tamarind sauce.
Bokkeumbap		Korea	Fried rice, usually with some other ingredient, like kimchi bokkeumbap (Kimchi fried rice)
Boribap		Korea	Rice boiled with barley
Boudin		United States	Cajun rice dressing stuffed into a sausage casing.
Bubur ayam		Indonesia	An Indonesian chicken congee, served with condiments such as chopped scallion, crispy fried shallot, and tongcay (preserved salted vegetables).
Bubur pedas		Indonesia	Bubur pedas is made from finely ground sauteed rice and grated coconut. The stock is made either from tetelan (bony meat such as ribs) or chicken broth.
Burasa		Indonesia	Cooked with coconut milk packed inside a banana leaf pouch
Burong isda		Philippines	A Filipino dish consisting of cooked rice and raw filleted fish fermented with salt and angkak (red yeast rice) for around a week.
Buttered rice		Myanmar	Buttered rice uses long-grained paw hsan hmwe or basmati rice, and in its most basic form, is cooked with butter, lentils, and bay leaves. Cashew nuts and raisins may be added, and the dish can be spiced with cinnamon sticks, cardamom pods or cloves, and garnished with fried golden onions to serve. It is typically paired with a traditional Burmese or Indian influenced chicken or mutton curry.
Cabidela		Portugal	Rice with chicken or rabbit meat.
Carri		Mauritius, Réunion	Rice, with chicken or beef, tomatoes, chili and curry
Chalbap		Korea	Cooked sweet rice mixed with red beans, jujubes and chestnuts
Champorado		Philippines	Sweet chocolate rice porridge
Chao		Vietnam	Vietnamese rice congee, sometimes cooked with pandan leaves or mung bean.
Charleston red rice		Coastal Georgia and South Carolina	Also known as Savannah red rice and as red rice.
Chazuke		Japan	Dashi, green tea, or hot water poured over cooked rice. Common toppings include Japanese pickles (tsukemono), nori, and fish roe such as tarako or mentaiko.
Chelow		Iran	Iranian Basmati rice with saffron, and sometimes served with tadig (can also be written as challow, chalo).
Chiayi turkey rice		Taiwan	This is a bowl of rice with shredded turkey layered on top, often accompanied by pickled radish. The rice is drizzled with a kind of gravy made from the turkey drippings and soy sauce.
Chitranna		India	This is a rice preparation made by sauteing groundnut, sesame seeds, red chili and turmeric in oil and adding it to cooked rice and mixing.
Ci fan tuan		Shanghai (China), and Taiwan	Prepared by tightly wrapping a piece of youtiao (fried dough) with glutinous rice.
Claypot rice		China, Malaysia and Singapore	A rice casserole. The rice is cooked in the claypot and the cooked ingredients such as proteins and vegetables are added in later. Some places serve it with dark soya sauce. Traditionally, the cooking is done over a charcoal stove, giving the dish a distinctive flavor.
Cơm hến		Vietnam	A dish in Vietnamese cuisine made using rice, cooked baby river mussels, rice, peanuts, pork rinds, shrimp paste, chili paste, starfruits and bạc hà stems.
Cơm tấm		Vietnam	A dish in Vietnamese cuisine made from rice with fractured rice grains. Tấm refers to the broken rice grains, while cơm refers to cooked rice.
Concoction rice		Nigeria	A Nigerian dish made using rice, palm oil, salt, and other seasonings.
Congee		East, South, and Southeast Asia	A type of porridge. Sometimes called "rice congee" but often simply shortened to "congee." There is a large variety of congee in Hong Kong and it is eaten very frequently as a staple food. The base is made by boiling rice then letting it simmer for a long time. Different ingredients are added depending on the region. The length of the simmering also varies by region. Cantonese congee is generally cooked longer for a smoother texture.
Coriander rice		India	Easily made by using boiled Basmati rice, coriander paste, oil, chana dal, onion, peas, ginger and garlic paste, Indian spices, lemon juice and salt.
Curd rice		India	Simple preparations are a mixture of boiled rice and yogurt. More complex variations also exist.
Curry rice		Japan, also popular in other parts of East and Southeast Asia	Although curry is often eaten with rice in many countries it is seen as a main dish. The Japanese karē raisu (lit. "curry rice") though, is a standard combination of rice with a British influenced Japanese curry, of which there exist several types.
Dal bhat		Indian subcontinent	Rice and lentil soup.
Danbauk		Myanmar	Burmese style Biryani.
Diri djondjon		Haiti	Rice in a sauce of djondjon or black mushrooms.
Dirty rice		Cajun cuisine, Creole cuisine	Pictured is dirty rice topped with a pork chop.
Dolma		Armenia, Azerbaijan, Turkey, Middle East, Greece, Georgia	Grape leaves, eggplant, zucchini, peppers, onion, or tomatoes stuffed with rice.
Dosa		India	Rice and lentil pancakes with origins in Tamil Nadu, and Karnataka. Popular breakfast dish in South India.
Espasol		Philippines	A cylinder-shaped Filipino rice cake. Originating from the province of Laguna, it is traditionally sold during the Christmas season. It is made from rice flour cooked in coconut milk and sweetened coconut strips and, afterwards, dusted with toasted rice flour.
Étouffée		Cajun, Creole cuisine	Found in both Cajun and Creole cuisine, Étouffée is typically prepared with shellfish over rice. The dish employs a technique known as smothering, a popular method of cooking in the Cajun areas of southwest Louisiana.
Flattened rice		India	Flattened Rice is plain parboiled rice flattened into flat, light, dry flakes originating from the Indian subcontinent.
Fried rice		China	A dish of cooked rice that has been stir-fried in a wok or a frying pan and is usually mixed with other ingredients such as eggs, vegetables, seafood, or meat.
Fried rice (India)		India	Basmati rice or other long grain rice boiled and then fried in oil or ghee with shrimp, egg, chicken, soy sauce, spices and various types of vegetables like carrots, green beans, bell peppers, onions, tomatoes, green onions, peas, celery etc.
Fried rice (Nigeria)		Nigeria	Fried rice made with thyme, bay leaves, west african curry powder, pepper, assorted vegetables, fried liver, sometimes with shrimp and sausage. Paired with Meat, fish or eggs and coleslaw or plantain and moin moin.
Fried rice (Myanmar)		Myanmar	Fried rice with boiled peas, sometimes with meat, sausage, and eggs.
Fried rice (Philippines)		Philippines	Day-old rice fried in oil with a lot of garlic, usually eaten for breakfast with dried fish, egg and tomatoes.
Gaifan		China, Taiwan	Cooked rice covered with another dish.
Galho		India	A popular Naga food made from a mixture of rice, vegetables and various meats
Gallo pinto		Central American countries such as Costa Rica and Nicaragua	A Central American version of rice and beans
Ginataang mais		Philippines	Glutinous rice porridge with coconut milk, sugar, and corn kernels
Ginataang munggo		Philippines	Glutinous rice porridge with coconut milk, sugar, and mung beans
Gimbap		Korea	Rice wrapped in seaweed, origin from makizushi of Japan
Glutinous rice cakes		Asia	E.g. mochi (Japan), ddeok (Korea), tangyuan, niangao, zongzi (China), and many varieties of Indonesian, Thai and Laotian cakes.
Goto		Philippines	Thin rice porridge cooked with strips of ox-tripe, ginger, onion, garlic, and garnished with spring onions and calamansi.
Gumbo		Cajun, Creole	A stew that is typically served over rice
Hainanese chicken rice		Indonesia, Malaysia, Singapore, and Thailand	Hainanese chicken rice is a dish of poached chicken and seasoned rice, served with chilli sauce and usually with cucumber garnishes.
Hainanese curry rice		Singapore	A Singaporean rice dish consisting of steamed white rice smothered in a mess of curries and gravy.
Havij Polo		Iran	Carrot Rice with minced meat balls usually cooked in Tehran and other cities of Iran
Hoppin' John		Southern United States	Rice, black-eyed peas and pork
Horchata		Mexico	Sugared rice milk.
Hsi htamin		Myanmar	A traditional Burmese snack or mont, popularly served as a breakfast dish, often served with sesame powder alongside peas or dried fish
Htamanè		Myanmar	Dessert made from glutinous rice, shredded coconuts and peanuts
Htamin Baung		Myanmar	Steamed rice cooked with chicken and vegetables, of Chinese origin
Htamin jin		Myanmar	A Burmese dish of fermented rice. It is the regional specialty and signature dish of the Intha people of Inle Lake in Shan State, Myanmar
Idiyappam		South India, Sri Lanka	Rice noodles also known as String Hoppers. Had with curry or coconut milk
Idli		India	Steamed rice cakes, made with lentils or other pulses. Pictured is idli along with ramekins of sambar and a ramekin of chutney in the center of the dish.
Imbul Kiribath		Sri Lanka	Tightly wrapped Kiribath with treacle soaked scraped coconut (Pani-pol) in it.
Indonesian rice table		Indonesia	Rice accompanied by side dishes served in small portions. Usually known as Rijsttafel
Iskilip Dolmasi		Turkey	Very specific rice food. It takes almost a day to prepare and cook. Cooked for several hundred years only in Iskilip. Extremely traditional and rare.
Jambalaya		Cajun, Creole	Meat-seafood-vegetable stock to which rice is added.
Jíbaro		Puerto Rico	Yellow-rice cooked with annatto oil, sofrito, and spices with a fried egg on top.
Jiuniang		China	This is a sweet dish made from fermenting sticky rice with yeast. This can be eaten alone steamed, or is added to other foods.
Jhalmuri		India, Bangladesh	Jhalmuri is a popular Bengali street snack, made of puffed rice and an assortment of spices, vegetables, chanachur and mustard oil.
Jollof rice		West Africa	Tomato and pepper based stew to which rice is added and boiled in, and usually served with chicken, salad and fried plantain.
Juk		Korea	Generic term for porridge made from rice. There are many different varieties.
Kabuli pulao		Afghanistan	Fried grated carrots in rice, accompanied with mixed spices and alubukhara.
Kabsa		KSA, Jordan	Rice (usually long-grain, mostly basmati) cooked with meat, spices and vegetables.
Kalamay		Philippines	A sticky sweet delicacy that is popular in many regions of the Philippines. It is made of coconut milk, brown sugar, and ground glutinous rice.
Kande Pohe		India	A simple flattened rice dish from Maharashtra usually eaten as breakfast.
Kateh		Iran	A simple sticky-rice dish from Mazandaran and Gilan
Katsudon		Japan	A bowl of rice topped with a deep-fried pork cutlet, egg, and condiments.
Kedgeree		India	Flaked fish (usually smoked haddock), boiled rice, eggs and butter.
Ketupat		Indonesia, Malaysia	(Also called Lontong) – Rice wrapped in coconut leaves weaved pouch, boiled and serve with other food such as Satay, vegetables, fried chicken, curry, etc. It is usually served during Aidilfitri
Khao kan chin		Thailand	A northern Thai dish of rice that is mixed with pork blood and steamed inside a banana leaf. It is served with cucumber, onions and fried, dried chillies.
Khao kha mu		Thailand	Originally a Thai Chinese dish, it is rice served with sliced pork leg that has been stewed in soy sauce and spices
Khao khluk kapi		Thailand	Rice is fried with shrimp paste and served with sweet pork, sour mango, fried shrimp, chillies and shallots.
Khao lam		Thailand	Glutinous rice is boiled or steamed with sugar, and sometimes other ingredients, in a section of bamboo. Most often eaten as a snack or dessert. This is very similar to lemang.
Khao man kai		Thailand	The Thai version of Hainanese chicken rice, it is made in a slightly different way than the original and served with a very different dipping sauce made from fermented soy beans, garlic, ginger, and bird's eye chilies.
Khao mok		Thailand	The Thai version of a biryani, it is typical of Thai-Muslim cuisine.
Khao na pet		Thailand	The Thai version of a Cantonese style roast duck served with rice
Khao niao mamuang		Thailand	Sticky rice cooked in sweetened thick coconut milk, served with slices of ripe mango
Khao phat kaeng kiao wan		Thailand	Rice fried with green curry
Khao phat kaphrao		Thailand	Rice fried with holy basil and meat
Khao phat nam liap		Thailand	Rice fried with the fruit of the Canarium album
Khao tom mat		Thailand	A traditional Thai dessert made from sticky rice, coconut milk, and bananas. It's usually wrapped in banana leaf or coconut leaf.
Khao tom pla		Thailand	A rice soup with fish
Khao yam		Thailand	A rice salad containing fruit, vegetables, herbs, roasted coconut, and dried prawns
Kharcho		Georgia	A beef and rice soup.
Kheer/Payas/Payasam		Indian subcontinent	Sweet dish of rice cooked in milk with dry fruit and sugar or jaggery. Cooled before serving.
Khichdi		Indian subcontinent	Rice cooked with lentils, vegetables and spices
Kiampong		Philippines	A Filipino glutinous rice casserole with toasted peanuts and scallions.
Kiping		Philippines	A traditional Filipino leaf-shaped wafer made from glutinous rice.
Kiribath		Sri Lanka	Cooked with milk. Also known as Milk-rice
Kongbap		Korea	Brown or white rice cooked together with beans (and sometimes also other grains)
Kuning		Philippines	A Filipino rice dish cooked with turmeric, lemongrass, salt, bay leaves, and other spices
Kushari		Egypt	Rice, lentils, chickpeas and macaroni topped with tomato sauce and fried onion
Kutsinta		Philippines	A type of steamed rice cake (puto) found throughout the Philippines. It is made from a mixture of tapioca or rice flour, brown sugar and lye
Lemang		Indonesia and Malaysia	Glutinous rice with coconut milk cooked in bamboo stalks over open fire. Traditional dish of the Minangkabau people accompanying Rendang.
Lemper		Indonesia	An Indonesian savory snack made of glutinous rice filled with seasoned shredded chicken, fish or abon (meat floss).
Lepet		Indonesia	A type of sticky rice dumpling mixed with peanuts cooked with coconut milk packed inside janur (young coconut leaf or palm leaf).
Linopot		Sabah, Malaysia	A type of hill rice or sticky rice dish common among the indigenous Kadazan-Dusun, Murut and Rungus wrapped in either doringin (terminalia catappa), tarap (artocarpus odoratissimus) or banana leaves.
Lontong		Indonesia	Made of compressed rice cake in the form of a cylinder wrapped inside a banana leaf. Rice is rolled inside a banana leaf and boiled, then cut into small cakes as a staple food replacement of steamed rice.
Loco Moco		Hawaii, United States	A bowl of rice topped with a meat patty and gravy, and with a sunny side up egg on top.
Locrio		Dominican Republic	Rice, meat (Chicken, sausage, fish, etc.), tomato sauce, caramelized sugar.
Lokri		Saint Martin	Rice, bite-size pieces of chicken, mixed vegetables, spices (also called locreo or locrio).
Loobia polo		Central Iran	Green beans rice with tomato paste, meat and other spices, cooked in.
Lo mai gai		China	Glutinous rice filled with chicken and other ingredients wrapped in a lotus leaf.
Lugaw		Philippines	A Filipino glutinous rice porridge.
Lumpia		Indonesia and Philippines	Spring rolls wrapper made from rice flour.
Madumongso		Indonesia	Snack made from black sticky rice as a basic ingredient. The taste is mixed with sweet because the black rice is previously processed before it becomes tapai
Maifun		Asia	This is a category which includes both dry and in-broth rice vermicelli noodle dishes. The specific dish is usually named after its non-vermicelli ingredients or its preparation. E.g. "Cao mai fun" = panfried maifun and will usually have a protein such as pork or chicken, and seasonings (usually green onion).
Mamposteao (fried rice)		Puerto Rico	Rice is stir-fried with bell peppers, ginger, garlic, beans, tomatoe, onions, sweet plantains, squash, herbs, spices, and the option of eggs, meat or seafood. It is typically eaten with avocado, grated queso fresco, and aïoli
Mandi		Yemen	Rice cooked with meat (lamb or chicken), and a mixture of spices.
Mansaf		Jordan	Rice is cooked separately, lamb meat is cooked in a sauce of fermented dried yogurt and served with rice or bulgur.
Maqluba		Middle-East	Consisting of rice and eggplant or cauliflower casserole that is then turned upside down when served. The dish can include fried tomatoes, carrots, potatoes, cauliflower, eggplant and chicken or lamb. When the casserole is inverted, the top is bright red from the tomatoes that now form the top layer and cover the golden eggplant.
Masa (Nigerian food)/Waina		Nigeria	Puffy dough pan bread made with rice flour
Masi		Cebu, Philippines	Glutinous rice balls with a peanut and muscovado filling
Moa		West Bengal, India	Moa is a small sweet and crispy ball made of puffed rice and jaggery. It originated from South 24 Parganas district of West Bengal.
Moa'amar		Egypt	Rice with milk and chicken soup. A sort of rice made by adding milk and chicken soup to the rice and letting it into the oven. Eaten instead of white rice. Very popular in Egypt.
Moche		Philippines	Filipino glutinous rice balls with a bean paste filling.
Mochi		Japan	Mochi is Japanese rice cake made of mochigome, a short-grain japonica glutinous rice, and sometimes other ingredients such as water, sugar, and cornstarch. The rice is pounded into paste and molded into the desired shape.
Mochi ice cream		Japan, United States	Mochi ice cream is a small, round confection consisting of a soft, pounded sticky rice dumpling (mochi) formed around an ice cream filling.
Moffle		Japan	A waffle prepared using mochi
Mont di		Myanmar	A thin rice noodle dish, a semi staple dish of Rakhine State. Rakhine Mont de is either a salad with dry roasted conger eel and chili or as a soup. Mandalay mont de is with larger rice noodles, with meat based sauce.
Mont lin maya		Myanmar	A fritter made with rice flour, where two halves (thus 'Couple') are fried with quail eggs, steamed garden beans, spring onions. The halves are then connected and sprinkled with salted roasted sesame.
Morón		Philippines	A Filipino rice cake made with glutinous rice, coconut milk, and chocolate
Mosaranna		India	Curd rice, considered a staple food of brahmins of the Karnataka state of South India. In this dish, curd is added to cooked rice and eaten straight away. Sometimes mustard seeds, red chillies, curry leaves and lentils are fried in oil and added to the dish. To add more flavour, ginger-garlic paste and finely chopped red onions are also added to the yogurt and rice mixture. Fresh, finely chopped cilantro is used as garnish.
Mujaddara		Iraq	Fried rice with lentil, served with yogurt and salad.
Muri		India, Bangladesh	A very common snack from Indian subcontinent.It is a traditional puffed rice made by heating parboiled rice (i.e. steamed then dried) in a karahi or wok filled with hot salt or sand, a technique known as hot salt frying.
Nasi ambeng		Indonesia	A fragrant rice dish that consists of – but is not limited to – steamed white rice, chicken curry or chicken stewed in soy sauce, beef or chicken rendang, sambal goreng (lit. fried sambal; a mildly spicy stir-fried stew commonly made with firm tofu, tempeh, and long beans) urap, bergedel, and serunding.
Nasi bakar		Indonesia	Indonesian for "burned rice" or "grilled rice". Nasi bakar refer to steamed rice seasoned with spices and ingredients and wrapped in banana leaf secured with lidi semat (small needle made of central rib of coconut leaf) and later grilled upon charcoal fire.
Nasi Beringin		Malaysia	A rice dish from Johor, originally served for Johorean royalties.
Nasi bogana		Indonesia	An-Indonesian style rice dish, originally from Tegal, Central Java. It is usually wrapped in banana leaves and served with side dishes
Nasi campur		Indonesia	Literally "mixed rice" in Indonesian; also called nasi rames in Indonesia. Nasi campur refers to a dish of rice topped with various meat and vegetable dishes, peanuts, eggs and fried-shrimp krupuk.
Nasi dagang		Malaysia	Rice steamed in coconut milk, fish curry and extra ingredients such as fried shaved coconut, hard-boiled eggs and vegetable pickles.
Nasi goreng		Indonesia, Malaysia	This is type of fried rice usually cooked with shrimp paste, chicken, meat, salted fish or/and vegetables.
Nasi gurih		Indonesia	Nasi gurih is made by cooking mixture of rice and sticky rice soaked in coconut milk instead of water, along with salt, lemongrass, Indian bay leaf, and pandan leaves to add aroma.
Nasi jinggo		Indonesia	Nasi jinggo is a Balinese typical fast food that is packaged with small portions of banana leaves.
Nasi kandar		Malaysia	Famously served by local Indian Muslims, and very popular in Penang.
Nasi kapau		Indonesia	Nasi kapau is a Minang steamed rice topped with various choices of dishes originated from Nagari Kapau, Bukittinggi, West Sumatra, Indonesia.
Nasi katok		Brunei	Composed of steamed rice, ayam goreng (fried chicken) and a spicy sambal sauce.
Nasi kebuli		Indonesia	An Indonesian variant of pilaf. It consists of rice cooked in goat meat broth, goat milk, and clarified butter (most often ghee).
Nasi kerabu		Malaysia	Dish from Kelantan, consisting of rice with various wild herbs and spices, grated coconut and dried shrimp or fish.
Nasi kucing		Indonesia	An Indonesian rice dish that originated from Yogyakarta, Semarang, and Surakarta but has since spread. It consists of a small portion of rice with toppings, usually sambal, dried fish, and tempeh, wrapped in banana leaves.
Nasi kuning		Indonesia	(Indonesian for: "yellow rice"), or sometimes called nasi kunyit (Indonesian for: "turmeric rice"), is an Indonesian rice dish cooked with coconut milk and turmeric,
Nasi lemak		Malaysia	Coconut steamed rice
Nasi lemuni		Malaysia	A rice dish prepared with a herb, Vitex trifolia, locally known as lemuni.
Nasi liwet		Indonesia	An Indonesian dish rice dish cooked in coconut milk, chicken broth and spices
Nasi padang		Indonesia	Steamed rice served with various choices of pre-cooked dishes, it is a miniature banquet of meats, fish, vegetables, and spicy sambals eaten with plain white rice, it is Sumatra's most famous export and the Minangkabau's great contribution to Indonesian cuisine.
Nasi tim		Indonesia	In Indonesian language nasi means (cooked) rice and tim means steam. The ingredients are chicken, mushroom and hard boiled egg. These are seasoned in soy sauce and garlic, and then placed at the bottom of a tin bowl. This tin bowl is then filled with rice and steamed until cooked. This dish is usually served with light chicken broth and chopped leeks.
Nasi timbel		Indonesia	An Indonesian hot dish, consisting of steamed rice wrapped inside a banana leaf
Nasi tutug oncom		Indonesia	An Indonesian style rice dish, made of rice mixed with oncom fermented beans
Nasi tumpang		Malaysia	Rice with different layer of dishes wrapped in a cone shape with banana leaf packed
Nasi uduk		Indonesia	Steamed rice cooked in coconut milk
Nasi ulam		Indonesia	An Indonesian steamed rice dish mixed with various herbs, especially the leaves of Asiatic pennywort (Centella asiatica) or often replaced with kemangi (lemon basil), vegetables, spices and accompanied with various side dishes
Nurungji		Korea	A traditional Korean food made of scorched rice. After boiling and serving rice, a thin crust of scorched rice will usually be left in the bottom of the cooking pot. This yellowed scorched state is described as 'nureun' (Korean: 눌은) in Korean and nurungji derives from this adjective.
Ofada rice		Nigeria	Nigerian rice sometimes served in palm leaves. It is made from locally produced rice that is grown almost entirely in Ogun State. It is typically consumed with a meat-based stew like lafenwa sauce, Ofada sauce, ayamase or with a vegetable stew,. Eggs are also common alongside the dish many times soaked in the tomato and pepper based stews.
Ogokbab		Korea	A traditional Korean food cooked with five grains. One of the Daeboreum foods for the Lunar New Year, rice is cooked by mixing glutinous rice, red bean, glutinous millet, black beans, sticky sorghum etc.
Okowa		Japan	Sticky glutinous rice mixed with various vegetables or meat and steamed
Okoy		Philippines	Filipino crispy deep-fried fritters made with glutinous rice batter, unshelled small shrimp, and various vegetables, including calabaza, sweet potato, cassava, mung bean sprouts, scallions and julienned carrots, onions, and green papaya.
Omurice		Japan	An omelette made with fried rice and thin, fried scrambled eggs, usually topped with ketchup
Onigiri		Japan	Short grained rice formed into balls with or without savory fillings, a popular snack.
Orez Shu'it		Israel	Consists of white beans cooked in a tomato paste and served on white rice.
Pabellón criollo		Venezuela	Rice, shredded beef and stewed black beans.
Paella		Spain (Valencia)	A rice dish that takes its name from the wide, shallow traditional pan used to cook the dish on an open fire. It can contain a variety of meats, beans, and vegetables, and is usually colored yellow by the inclusion of saffron.
Palitaw		Philippines	A small, flat, sweet rice cake made by boiling rice batter until they float
Pancit bihon		Philippines	Noodles made from rice flour, also refers to the cooked dish made with rice noodles with slivers of meat, seafood and vegetables such as onions, carrots, beans, cabbage, seasoned with soy sauce and calamansi
Pakhala		Odisha	A type of Fermented Rice, typically served with Curd, fish, badi, spinach etc. Mainly Consumed in the Indian state of Odisha
Panta bhat		West Bengal, Bangladesh	A traditional Filipino fried rice pancake.
Panyalam		Philippines	A traditional Filipino fried rice pancake. It is made with ground glutinous rice, muscovado (or brown sugar), and coconut milk mixed into a batter that is deep-fried.
Pastil		Philippines	A Filipino packed rice dish made with steamed rice wrapped in banana leaves with dry shredded beef, chicken, or fish.
Perde pilavı		Turkey	A special pilav with chicken meat, all wrapped inside yufka, thin Turkish dough, and cooked in an oven
Phở		Vietnam	Rice noodle soup
Pilaf (or Pilau)		Indian subcontinent	Rice cooked in a seasoned broth. In some cases, the rice may also attain its brown color by being stirred with bits of cooked onion, as well as a large mix of spices. Depending on the local cuisine, it may also contain meat, fish, vegetables, and (dried) fruits.
Pinipig		Philippines	A flattened rice dish from the Philippines. It is made of immature grains of glutinous rice pounded until flat before being toasted.
Pitha		West Bengal, Assam, Odisha, Tripura, Bangladesh	Pithas are primarily made from a dough or batter of rice flour or wheat flour, which is shaped and optionally filled with sweet or savory ingredients called "Pur" which consists grated coconut stirred in syrup or baked or fried vegetable. There is also many other types of Pithas that doesn't contains "Pur" and can simply be made by frying rice flower batter in vegetable oil like a pancake.
Pittu		Sri Lanka	Steamed rice cake.
Moros y Cristianos		Cuba	White rice and black beans cooked together with spices.
Plov		Central Asia	Medium grain rice with carrots, onions, spices, lamb, and cottonseed oil
Poha		India	Poha is a popular Indian snack prepared by frying water soaked flattened rice in ghee or vegetable oil with chilies, onions, cumin seeds, mustard seeds, peanuts, boiled potatoes and curry leaves (called Kadi-patta).
Pongal		India	Sakkara pongal : A sweet rice dish, cooked with rice, moong dhal, jaggery and milk, flavoured with cardamom and garnished with cashew and raisins. Ven / Katte pongal: rice, moong dhal, milk, salt, pepper corns, ginger, cummin seeds and curry leaves.
Poule au riz		France	Consists of a poached or braised chicken served with rice cooked in the chicken's cooking liquid.
Puffed rice cakes		Indian subcontinent	Commonly used in breakfast cereal or snack foods, and served as a popular street food.
Pulihora		India	Pulihora is rice seasoned with tamarind.
Puso		Cebu, Philippines	Rice filled inside a pouch made with woven strips of coconut frond then boiled.
Puto		Philippines	A steamed rice cake made from stone-ground soaked rice with coconut milk. Various toppings such as cheese, salted egg, or minced meat may be added.
Puto bumbong		Philippines	A Filipino purple rice cake steamed in bamboo tubes.
Puto seco		Philippines	Filipino cookies made from ground glutinous rice, cornstarch, sugar, salt, butter, and eggs.
Puttu		India	Steamed rice cake.
Qidreh		Palestine	A rice and meat dish traditionally prepared in a clay pot that is cooked in a wood fired oven
Quzi		Iraq	A lamb and rice dish popular in the Arab world with many variations
Red beans & rice		New Orleans, United States	Staple made with kidney beans, ham bones, pickled pork, andouille, onion, celery, bell pepper and seasonings.
Rice and curry	A Sri Lankan rice and curry meal consisting of cassava curry, curried lamb, stir-fried beetroot, stir-fried winged beans, raw mango curry and kale mallum	Indian subcontinent	A meal of plain, spiced, or fried rice which is served together with several other dishes, of which at least one is a curry, on one plate, but sometimes with the other dishes on the side.
Rice and gravy		United States	A staple of Creole and Cajun cuisine
Rice and Obe ata		Yorubaland	Rice and a tomato-pepper based stew and sauces with meat,fish and/or eggs
Rice and peas		Caribbean	Rice with kidney beans, black-eyed peas or pigeon peas
Rice bath		India	A seasoned rice with vegetables (Such as egg-plant, peas, tomato), a breakfast dish from Karnataka, India
Rice bread		Asia	Bread made from rice flour.
Rice cakes		Asia	A rice cake may be any kind of food item made from rice that has been shaped, condensed, or otherwise combined into a single object.
Rice krispies		United Kingdom	A breakfast cereal made of crisped rice. Rice Krispies are also used to make Rice Krispies treats by combining the cereal with melted marshmallows.
Rice noodle roll		China	A thin roll made from a wide strip of shahe fen, filled with shrimp, beef, and vegetables.
Rice pudding		Worldwide	Sweet dish of rice cooked in milk, coconut milk or other thickening liquid. Eaten with various spices, fruits, condiments, etc. in different regions.
Risotto		Italy	Rice dish made by first frying in butter after which broth is added.
Riz Casimir		Switzerland	Curry rice with sliced veal and fruits
Riz gras		Burkino Faso	A dish with meat and vegetables atop rice.
Salukara		Philippines	A type of pancake of the Waray people in Eastern Samar, Philippines. It is made with galapong (or glutinous rice flour), coconut milk, sugar, and water.
Sandige		India	Deep fried meal accompaniment made with rice, sago and ash gourd
Sapin-sapin		Philippines	A layered glutinous rice and coconut dessert in Philippine cuisine. It is made from rice flour, coconut milk, sugar, water, flavoring and coloring.
Satti Sorru		India, Malaysia, Singapore, Indonesia	Satti soru, which means wok rice in Tamil, is a fairly common dish in South Indian households.Gravy from a curry is mixed into rice, to clean out the pan or the wok the curry was cooked in.
San Pyote		Myanmar	Burmese rice congree with either duck or fish
Sarma		Turkey, Azerbaijan, Armenia	Grape or cabbage leaves stuffed (rolled with) rice, various herbs and spices.
Şehriyeli pilav, pilaf with orzo		Turkey	Dish consisting of rice, with orzo.
Sel roti		Nepal	Ring shaped bread made from rice flour and eaten during Hindu festivals, especially Tihar.
Serabi		Indonesia	An Indonesian pancake that is made from rice flour with coconut milk or just plain shredded coconut as an emulsifier. Each province in Indonesia has various serabi recipes corresponding to local tastes.
Shirin polo		Cuisine of the Mizrahi Jews	A traditional Persian Jewish rice dish that is commonly served to mark special occasions such as weddings, Purim, Pesach, Rosh Hashanah and the high holidays.
Sholezard		Iran	This is a saffron rice dessert with nuts and rosewater
Shrimp Creole		Louisiana Creole cuisine	Cooked shrimp in a mixture of whole or diced tomatoes, the Holy trinity of onion, celery and bell pepper, spiced with Tabasco sauce or another hot pepper sauce or cayenne-based seasoning, and served over steamed or boiled white rice.
Shwe htamin		Myanmar	Burmese dessert dish, baked sweetened glutinous rice and jaggery
Shwe yin aye		Myanmar	Dessert dish consisting of glutinous rice, coconut milk and jelly
Sinangag		Philippines	Fried rice sauteed in garlic. A vital part of the "silog" meal ("Sinangag at Itlog"; trans: "fried rice and egg")
Siopao		Philippines	Steamed meat dumpling made with rice flour
Spanish rice		Mexico	Side dish made from white rice, tomatoes, garlic, onions, green and red bell peppers and other ingredients.
Steamed rice		East, South and Southeast Asia	Cooked rice
Sticky rice		China	Rice dish commonly made from glutinous rice and can include soy sauce, oyster sauce, scallions, cilantro and other ingredients
Stir fry		China	Pictured is Thai Phat naem sai khai, sausage of rice-fermented raw pork skin stir fried with egg.
Suman		Philippines	Sticky rice cooked with coconut milk and sugar and wrapped in banana or coconut leaves.
Sushi		Japan	Sticky rice flavored with vinegar and sugar, with various fillings or toppings
Sweet saffron rice		India	Dish consisting of joha rice, sugar and saffron.
Szczecin paprikash		Poland	A fish, rice, and tomato spread, often canned. It can be classified as a fast food and remains a delicacy in the port city of Szczecin.
Taco rice		Japan (Okinawa)	Taco-flavored ground beef served on a bed of rice, frequently served with shredded cheese, shredded lettuce, tomato, and salsa.
Tahdig		Iran	A specialty of Iranian cuisine consisting of crisp, caramelized rice taken from the bottom of the pot in which the rice (chelow) is cooked.
Tangyuan		China, Taiwan and Southeast Asia	A traditional (at least from the Ming dynasty) food that is made from glutinous rice paste that has been rolled into small balls, boiled, then put into a soup base. These are traditionally white in color. Sometimes savory or sweet stuffings (such as red bean paste) are added.
Tapai		Southeast Asia (Brunei, Indonesia, Malaysia, and Singapore)	A traditional Southeast Asian fermented rice cakes which is traditionally wrapped with leaves and taste sweet and sour due to fermentation. In Indonesia, tapai usually added to traditional beverage like es cendol or eaten by itself. Other version of tapai within the country is tapai singkong (tape singkong) which is fermented steamed cassava. In Brunei, Malaysia, and Singapore, the most common of tapai rice cakes dessert is the tapai pulut or tapai ubi.
Teurgoule		France	Rice pudding that is a speciality of Normandy
Thai fried rice		Thailand	Fried jasmine rice, usually containing meat (chicken, shrimp, and crab are all common), egg, onions, garlic, and sometimes tomatoes.
Thalassery biryani		India	Also known as Malabar biryani, Thalassery biryani is a rice-based dish made with spices, rice (khyma rice, and not basmati rice) and chicken (specially dressed for biriyani). Variations upon the dish may use mutton, fish, eggs or vegetables.
Thingyan rice		Myanmar	Fully boiled rice in candle-smelt water served with pickled marian plums
Tinapayan		Philippines	A Filipino dish consisting of tapay (fermented cooked rice) and dried fish.
Tinutuan		Indonesia	Tinutuan is a congee made from rice, pumpkin and sweet potato or cassava cooked up into a pulp.
Tube rice pudding		Taiwan	This is Taiwanese dish consisting of a stir-fried glutinous rice mixture that is seasoned with shiitake mushroom, minced pork, rousong, shallots and steamed in a bamboo tube.
Tupig		Philippines	A Filipino rice cake originating from northwestern Luzon, made from ground slightly-fermented soaked glutinous rice (galapong) mixed with coconut milk, muscovado sugar, and young coconut (buko) strips. It is wrapped into a cylindrical form in banana leaves and baked directly on charcoal, with frequent turning.
Tuwo		Nigeria	Rice balls as a type of Okele made to be eaten with stews and soups.
Waakye		Ghana	Rice and beans cooked with waakye leaves to give it a brownish colour. Eaten with shito and eggs, meat or fish.
Xôi		Vietnam	Glutinous rice mixed with a variety of other ingredients, can be made savory or sweet.
Yabra'		Middle East, Turkey	Grape leaves stuffed with rice and cooked with vegetables. The dish name differs from one country to another.
Yakimochi		Japan	Literally grilled or broiled mochi or pounded rice cake. Traditionally, it is prepared using a small charcoal grill but in modern times a gas grill can be used. During the time of the Autumn Moon it is traditional to eat fresh yakimochi while sipping sake and enjoying the view of the full moon.
Yay Monte		Myanmar	Thin savory rice pancake with boiled garden peas, spring onions and salted sesame garnish
Yangzhou fried rice		China	A popular Chinese-style wok fried rice dish in many Chinese restaurants in China, the Americas, Australia, United Kingdom, Vietnam, and the Philippines. The ingredients vary, but there are staple items such as cooked rice (preferably day-old because freshly cooked rice is too sticky, barbecued pork, Cooked shrimp, scallions (spring onions or green onions), chopped, including green ends and egg yolks.
Yin yang fried rice		Hong Kong	Dish served with chicken in tomato sauce on one side, and shrimp and peas in an egg white sauce on the other, shaped into a yin yang symbol, with rice as base.
Zarda		Indian subcontinent	Sweet dish of rice cooked in clarified butter/ banaspati oil with a variety of dried fruits such as orange in color
Zeera rice/Jeera rice		India	Steamed rice, Zeera (cumin), Zeera powder, ginger-garlic paste, salt, oil, chana dal and red chillies are cooked together to prepare this dish.
Zereshk polo		Qazvin Province, Iran	This is caramelized barberries sprinkled on plain buttery basmati rice and served usually with chicken.
Zongzi		China	Glutinous rice, stuffed with various ingredients and wrapped in bamboo leaves
Uppudu pindi		India	A rice dish made from rice flour, made like upma, eaten in Telangana.
Zosui		Japan	A rice soup made from pre-cooked rice and water. Leftover soup from nabe is often re-used for zosui.

== Unsorted ==
- Aiwowo
- Bagoong fried rice
- Buttered rice
- Insalata di riso
- Kanika
- KFC rice
- Lentil rice
- Mutabbaq samak
- Sayadieh

== See also ==
- Arabic rice – a pilaf preparation using rice and vermicelli noodles
- List of fried rice dishes
- List of rice beverages
- List of rice varieties
- List of tortilla-based dishes
- Pakistani rice dishes
