= Pakistani rice dishes =

Varieties of Pakistani cuisine

Pakistani rice dishes are popular across the country, and based on Pakistan's role major producer, consumer, and exporter rice, with Basmati being the most commonly used variety. Rice is often served alongside or mixed with other dishes.

One of the simplest and most common meals in Pakistani cuisine is plain cooked rice (chawal) paired with dal (lentils). Khichdi is a comforting dish made by cooking rice and dal together, while Karhi chawal consists of plain rice served with karhi, a yogurt-based curry. Biryani, a beloved dish, is prepared with beef, lamb, chicken, fish or shrimp offering a rich and flavorful rice experience.

== Plain cooked rice ==
The rice is rinsed a few times in water and drained until the water turns from milky to clear. The rice should be soaked in water for at least 30 minutes before cooking. The unsoaked rice takes 25 minutes to parboil, whereas the soaked grains take only 15 minutes. Rice should be parboiled till al dente. Place the presoaked rice into a pot with some cold tap water at a ratio of about 1 cup rice to 1.5 cups water. Cook the rice, with the pot lid open, at medium heat till the water is mostly evaporated and tiny pockets of air are visibly forming in the rice as the water level evaporates and goes down below the rice. Once the water is almost fully evaporated, turn the heat to its lowest possible setting and close the lid with as tight a seal as possible. The aim now is to let the last bit of water steam in the pot and the rice will become al dente in the steam, this usually takes anywhere from 3 to 7 minutes.

== Rice dishes ==
The following is a list of most popular rice dishes in Pakistan.

Name	Image	Legume, pulses or main ingredient	Description
Biryani		rice and chicken, beef or mutton	Biryani is a rice dish in which different spices and meat is used .
Hyderabadi biriyani			
Kheer		Milk and raisins	kheer is made by cooking milk until it is concentrated to a certain thickness and then sugar and raisins are added
Khichdi		rice	
Khushka Rice			
Plain cooked rice		basmati or any type of rice	it is made by just boiling rice
Saffron rice			
Sindhi biryani			
Spiced rice			
Tehri			Tehri is pictured left, served with kachumbar salad
Pulao			Basmati rice with mutton, beef, or chicken.
Zeera rice			Steamed rice, Zeera (cumin), Zeera powder, ginger-garlic paste, salt, oil, chana dal and red chillies.
Zarda		Sugar, candied fruit	Sweet dish of rice cooked in vegetable oil or butter, chopped candied fruit and/or dried fruit, nuts, and spices

== See also ==
- List of rice dishes
