= Zarda =

Zarda may refer to:

- Power Princess, Marvel Comics character
- Zarda (food), South Asian rice dish
- flavoured tobacco used in paan
- Altitude Express, Inc. v. Zarda was landmark case before the Supreme Court of the United States involving employment discrimination under the Title VII of the Civil Rights Act of 1964 related to sexual orientation.
