= Saffron rice =

Dish made from saffron, white rice and usually vegetable bouillon

Saffron Rice
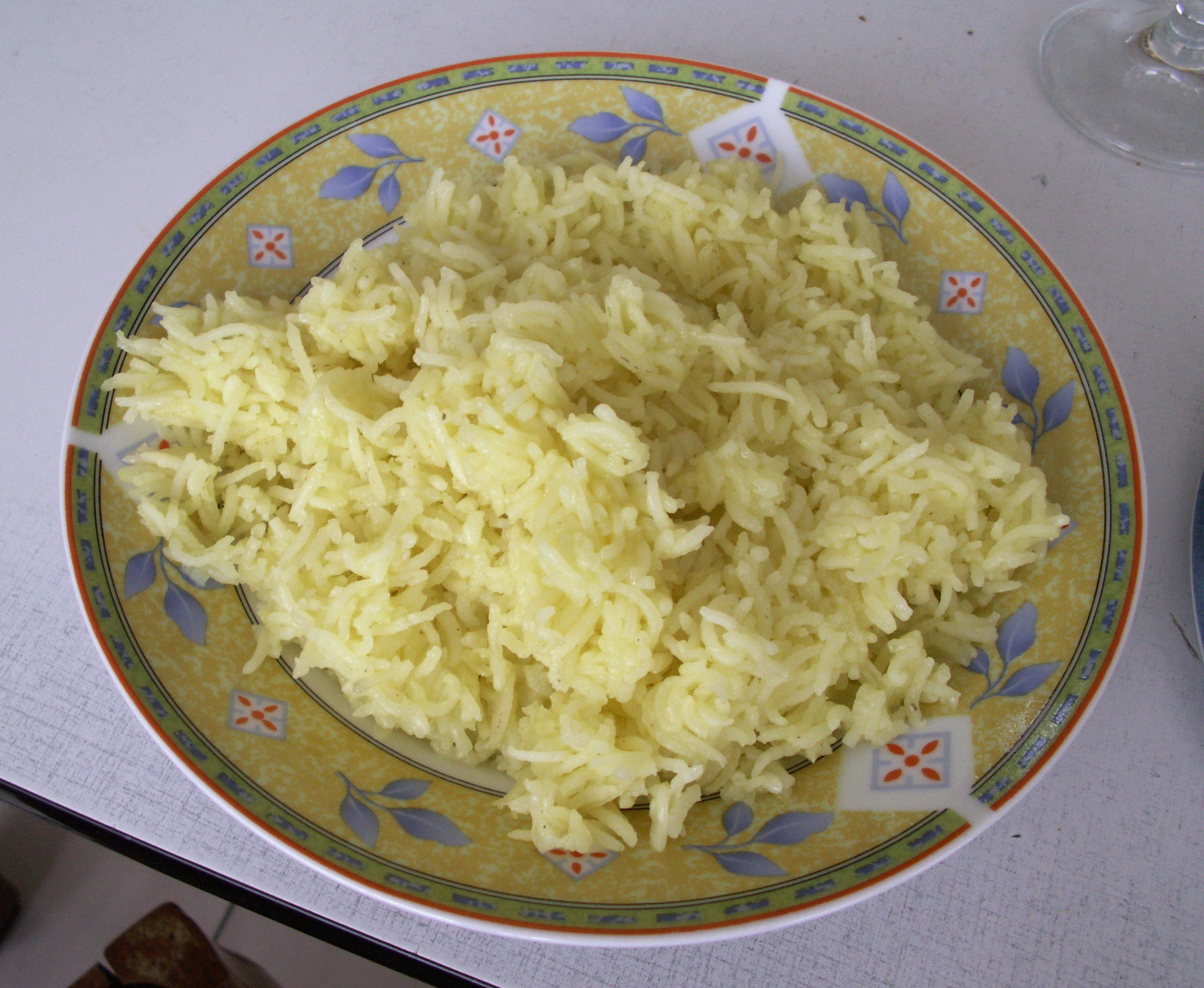
- Basic saffron rice, made with bouillon cubes and saffron
- Course: Dessert
- Region or state: Iran
- Main ingredients: White rice, saffron, vegetable bouillon
- Variations: Zerde

Saffron rice is a dish made from saffron, white rice and also usually vegetable bouillon. Saffron rice is found in the cuisines of many countries (in one form or another). The recipe is similar to plain cooked rice with addition of ingredients.

== Variations ==
Saffron rice is a dish in the cuisine of Seychelles.

=== South Asia ===
In Bangladesh, Pakistan and India, plain saffron rice is cooked with joha rice or basmati rice, saffron, vegetable bouillon, ghee, and bay leaves.

=== Middle East ===
In Iran, saffron is usually paired with rice for savory dishes like tahchin. Also in Iran as well as in Turkey, sweet saffron rice called Sholezard and Zerde are made from white rice, saffron, table sugar, rose water, roasted pine seeds, and chopped pistachio nuts.

Other, similar dishes exist in other parts of West Asia.

== See also ==
- List of rice dishes
