= Cơm gà rau thơm =

Chicken and rice dish from Vietnamese cuisine

In Vietnamese cuisine, cơm gà rau thơm is a popular chicken and rice dish. This dish is rice cooked in chicken stock and topped with fried then shredded chicken, with mint and other herbs. The texture and flavor of the rice are enhanced by the garnish of fried mint. It is served with herb sauce on the side.

== See also ==
- List of chicken dishes
- List of rice dishes
