= Zereshk polo =

Iranian rice dish

Zereshk polo زرشک‌پلو
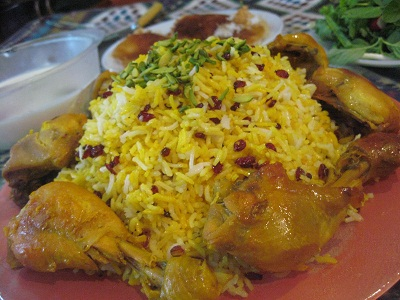
- Barberry rice with chicken (zereshk polo ba morgh)
- Course: Main
- Place of origin: Iran
- Region or state: Khorasan
- Serving temperature: Hot
- Main ingredients: Basmati rice, barberries, chicken (or lamb), saffron, rosewater, Advieh

Zereshk polo (Persian: زرشک‌پلو, lit. 'barberry rice') is an Iranian rice dish featuring basmati rice layered or topped with tart red barberries (zereshk), and often served with saffron-infused chicken (morgh), or other meats. It is considered a festive or ceremonial dish (majlesi), prized for its vibrant crimson accents, balanced sweet-tart flavor, and aromatic saffron notes, and is commonly prepared for gatherings, weddings, and special occasions. In the United States, this dish is sometimes prepared during Thanksgiving.

== Etymology ==
The name zereshk polo is a combination of the Persian words for barberries (زرشک; zereshk) and cooked rice (پلو; polo), particularly the steamed variety characteristic of Iranian cooking. When served with chicken (morgh), it is commonly called zereshk polo ba morgh (زرشک پلو با مرغ).

== History ==
Barberries have been used in Iranian cuisine since ancient times, with evidence of their culinary application in regions such as Khorasan. References to barberries appear in classical Persian literature, including allusions in the Shahnameh of Ferdowsi, though not necessarily in rice dishes.

The combination of barberries with rice as a distinct polo emerged more prominently during the Safavid dynasty (16th–18th centuries), when rice-based dishes gained sophistication in court cuisine, often featuring sweet-sour profiles and luxurious ingredients like saffron. Historical cookery texts from this era classify it among "sour" polos.

The addition of chicken or meat became standardized later, likely during the Qajar dynasty (19th century), when poultry became more common and elaborate mehmooni (party) dishes proliferated. By the modern era, zereshk polo ba morgh has become widespread across Iran, particularly popular in northern provinces such as Gilan and Mazandaran, and is a staple at family celebrations and formal meals.

While some popular accounts claim ancient or multi-millennial origins for the complete dish, reliable sources trace the specific barberry-rice pairing to the Safavid period and its meat accompaniment to later developments.

== Ingredients ==
Typical ingredients for zereshk polo ba morgh include: long-grain basmati rice (soaked and parboiled), dried barberries (zereshk-e poloee), chicken pieces (breast, thigh, or whole), onion, sugar (to balance tartness), saffron (bloomed), butter and/or oil, spices: turmeric, salt, sometimes cumin or advieh, and optional garnishes: slivered almonds, pistachios, fried onions.

== Preparation ==
The dish is prepared in two main parts: the rice and the topping or accompaniment. The rice follows the classic Persian rice method: soaked, parboiled until al dente, drained, and steamed (dam kardan) in a pot with oil and/or butter, often creating tahdig (crispy golden crust) at the bottom using lavash bread or sliced potatoes. Separately, chicken is sautéed or braised with onions, tomato paste (in some versions), turmeric, and saffron broth until tender and flavorful.

Barberries are briefly sautéed with a little sugar and saffron water to soften and mellow their tartness, then layered or scattered over the rice. The chicken may be placed beneath the rice layers during steaming for flavor infusion, or served on the side. The finished dish is inverted onto a platter to display the tahdig and garnished with extra barberries and nuts.

Variations exist by region, or family; some incorporate more sugar for sweetness, while others emphasize the natural tartness.

== See also ==
- Tahdig
- Sabzi polo
- Baghali polo
