= Nasi tumpang =

Rice dish from Kelantan, Malaysia

Nasi tumpang ناسي تومڤڠ
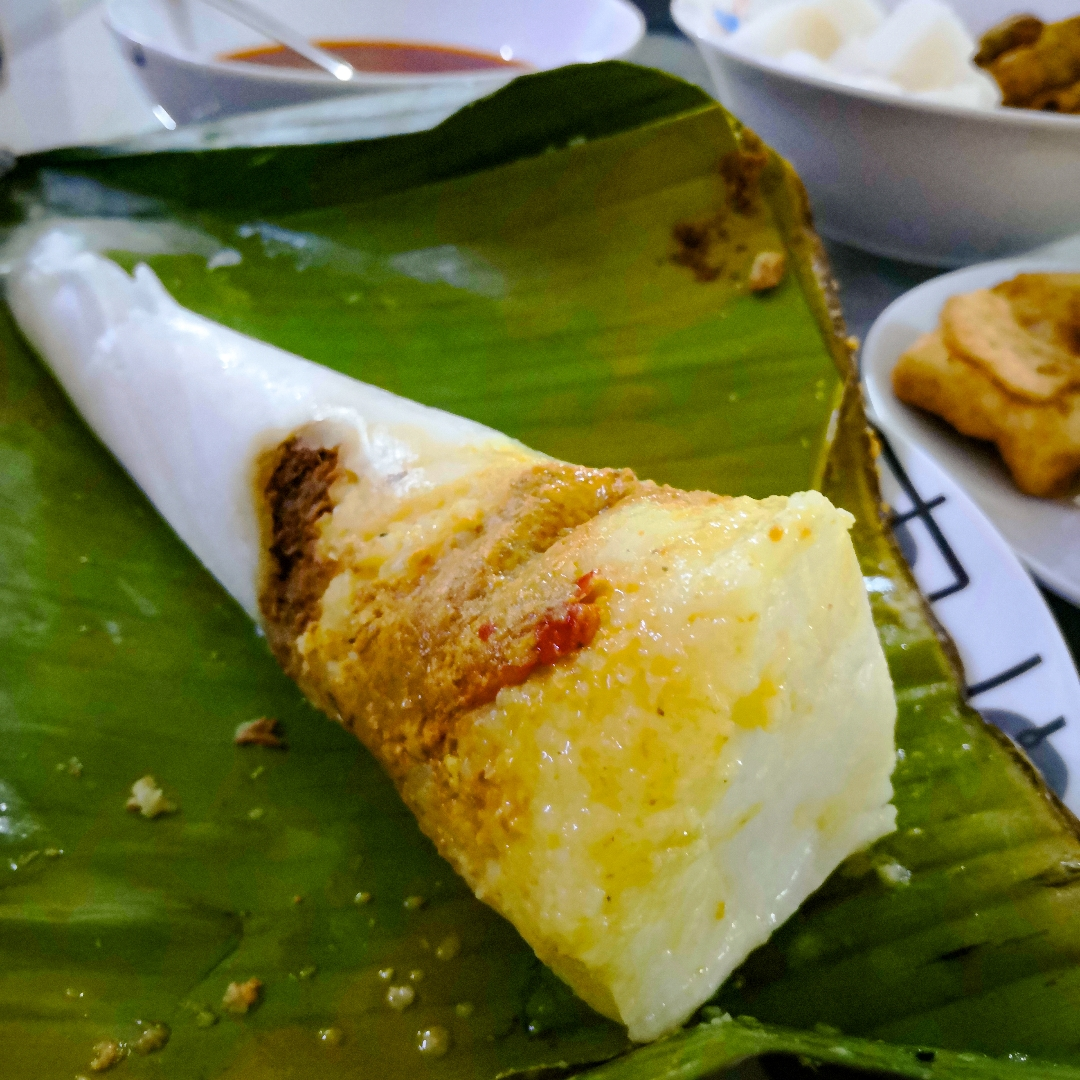
- Type: Rice dish
- Course: Main
- Place of origin: Malaysia
- Region or state: Kelantan
- Created by: Kelantanese Malays
- Main ingredients: Rice, omelette, meat floss, chicken, fish or shrimp gulai, sambal

Nasi tumpang (Kelantanese: Nasik tupe, Jawi: ناسي تومڤڠ) is a rice dish originating in Kelantan, Malaysia. Nasi tumpang consists of rice with different layers of fillings shaped into a cone and wrapped in a banana leaf to retain its fragrance.

== Etymology ==
The term nasi tumpang is derived from Malay, in which nasi means rice and tumpang means overlaying.

== History ==
According to folklore, the dish was prepared by wife of farmers,travellers and fisherman to bring to work. It is common for Kelantanese to have hearty food in the morning to allow them to endure the phyical and demanding works throughout the day.

== Ingredients ==
The accompanying dishes usually consists of an omelette, beef or fish floss, shrimp or fish gulai, sweet sambal and cucumbers. The rice will be traditionally cooked with extra water to make it sticky and easy to be filled in a banana cone. The dish is later layered and grilled over fire, to give it fragrant flavor of the banana leaf.This also allow the dish to last longer.

== See also ==
- Nasi kerabu, another common rice dish from Kelantan
- Nasi campur
- Nasi dagang
- Nasi lemak
- Nasi lemuni
- Nasi kandar
