= Loobia polo =

Iranian dish of rice, green beans, and beef or lamb

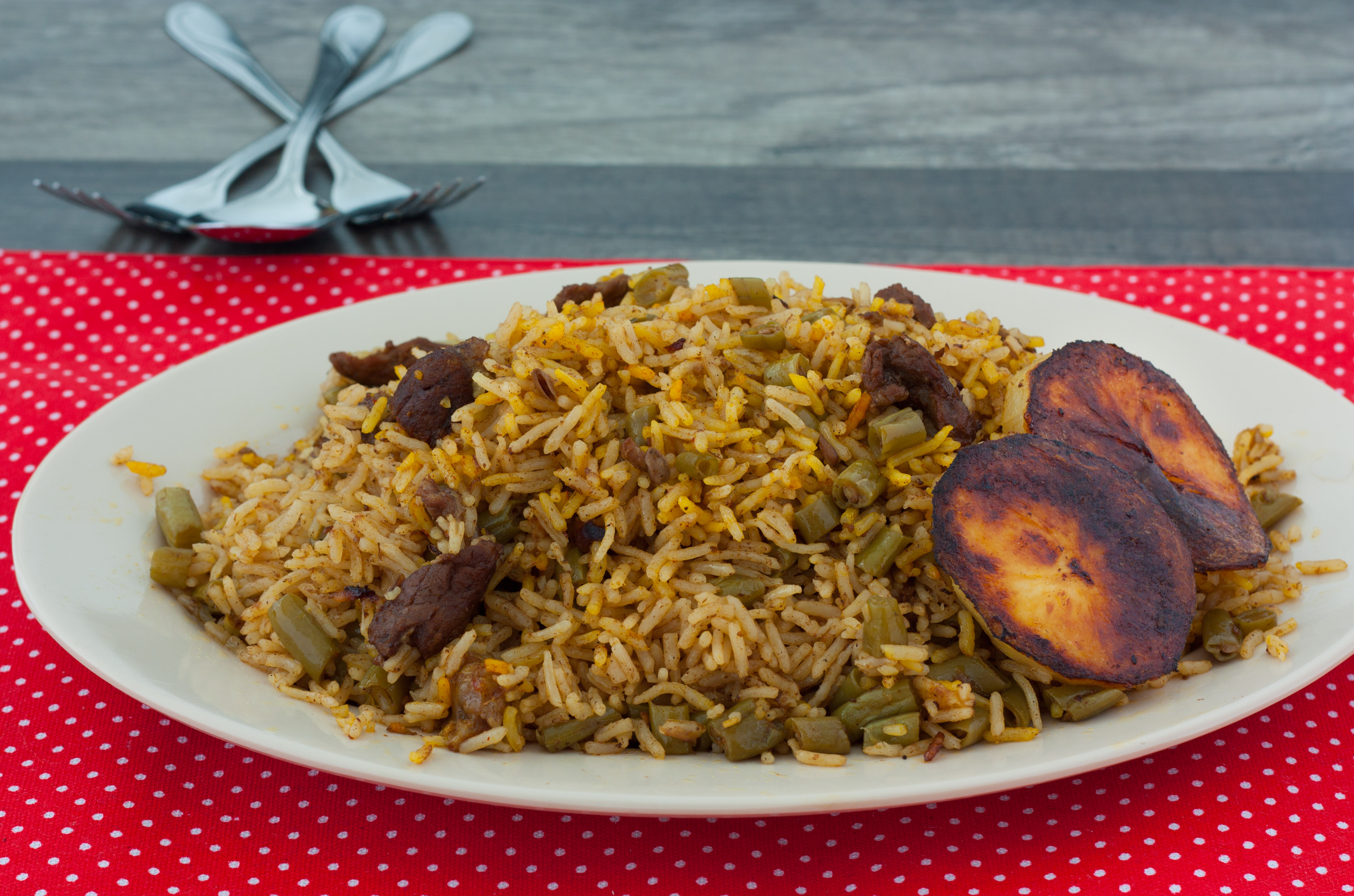
- Loobia Polo, an Iranian pilaf with green beans and tomato
- Alternative names: Loobia polow
- Type: Rice dish
- Course: Main course
- Place of origin: Iran
- Region or state: Shiraz
- Serving temperature: Hot
- Main ingredients: Rice, green beans, beef
- Similar dishes: Tahdig, albaloo polo

Loobia polo (Persian: لوبیا پلو also called Estamboli polo Persian: استانبولی پلو) is an Iranian dish of rice, green beans, and beef or lamb. In the Persian language, loobia means bean while polo is a style of cooked rice, known in English as pilaf. It is made by sautéing onion with a touch of turmeric powder followed by mixing in the beef or lamb, and then adding sautéed green beans with salt and pepper. Additional flavorings, such as tomato, saffron, and cinnamon, are also commonly added to the mixture. This mixture is then layered with half-cooked rice in another pot and steamed until done.

Loobia polo can also be made by using chicken or lamb instead of beef, and by using rice cooked in the kateh style.

== See also ==
- List of rice dishes
- Iranian cuisine
- Pilaf
