= Baghali polo =

Iranian delicacy

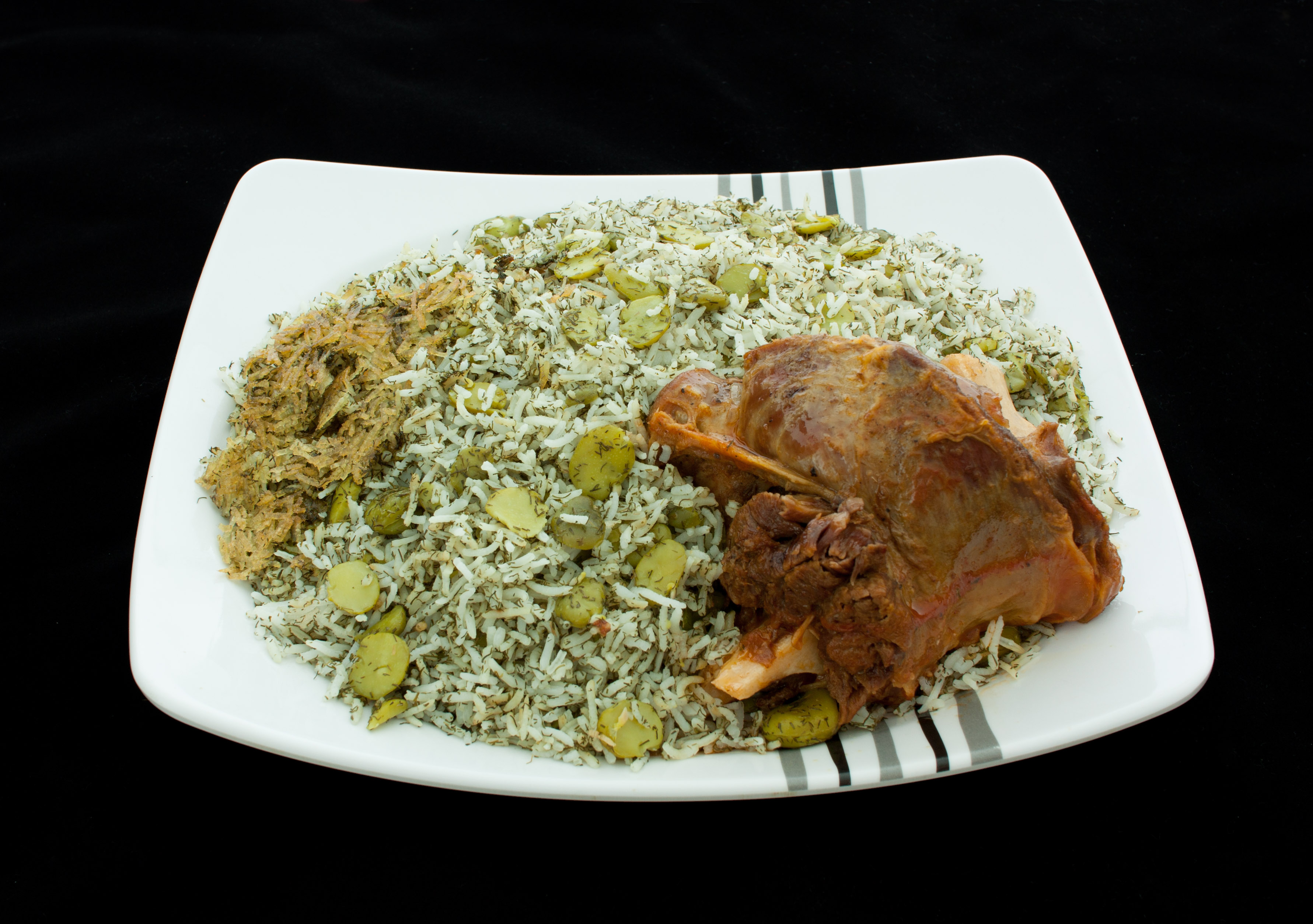
- Alternative names: Paxla plov, şüyüd plov
- Type: Rice dish
- Course: Main dish
- Place of origin: Iran
- Region or state: Iran
- Associated cuisine: Iranian cuisine
- Created by: Iranians
- Serving temperature: Hot
- Main ingredients: rice, broad beans, dill
- Variations: Qazmaq
- Similar dishes: albaloo polo

Baghali polo (Persian: باقلا پلو); is an Iranian dish of rice, fava beans and dill. In Persian, baghali means fava bean, while polo is pilaf, a style of cooked rice. It is made by cooking rice and green broad beans in boiling water. When cooked, the rice and beans are layered with dill in a pan, and everything is baked. Saffron water can also be added to the rice. Baghali polo is most commonly served with braised lamb shank, known in Farsi as mahiche, and is a traditional dish at Persian weddings and Nowruz (Persian New Year) celebrations.

Similar dishes are found throughout the Middle East and Caucasus. In Iraq the dish is called timman bagilla, using the Iraqi dialect term for rice, timman. In Azerbaijani it's called şüyüd plov, meaning "dill rice", or paxla plov in reference to the fava beans.

When the rice is mostly cooked but before it has fully steamed, the pan may be lined with fresh unleavened egg dough to create a crispy bottom crust called kazmag in Azerbaijani, similar to the Iranian tahdig.

== See also ==
- Culture of Iran
- Iranian cuisine
- Khoresht
- List of rice dishes
- Polow (pilaf, polo, pelau)
