= Hainanese curry rice =

Singaporean curry rice and chicken dish

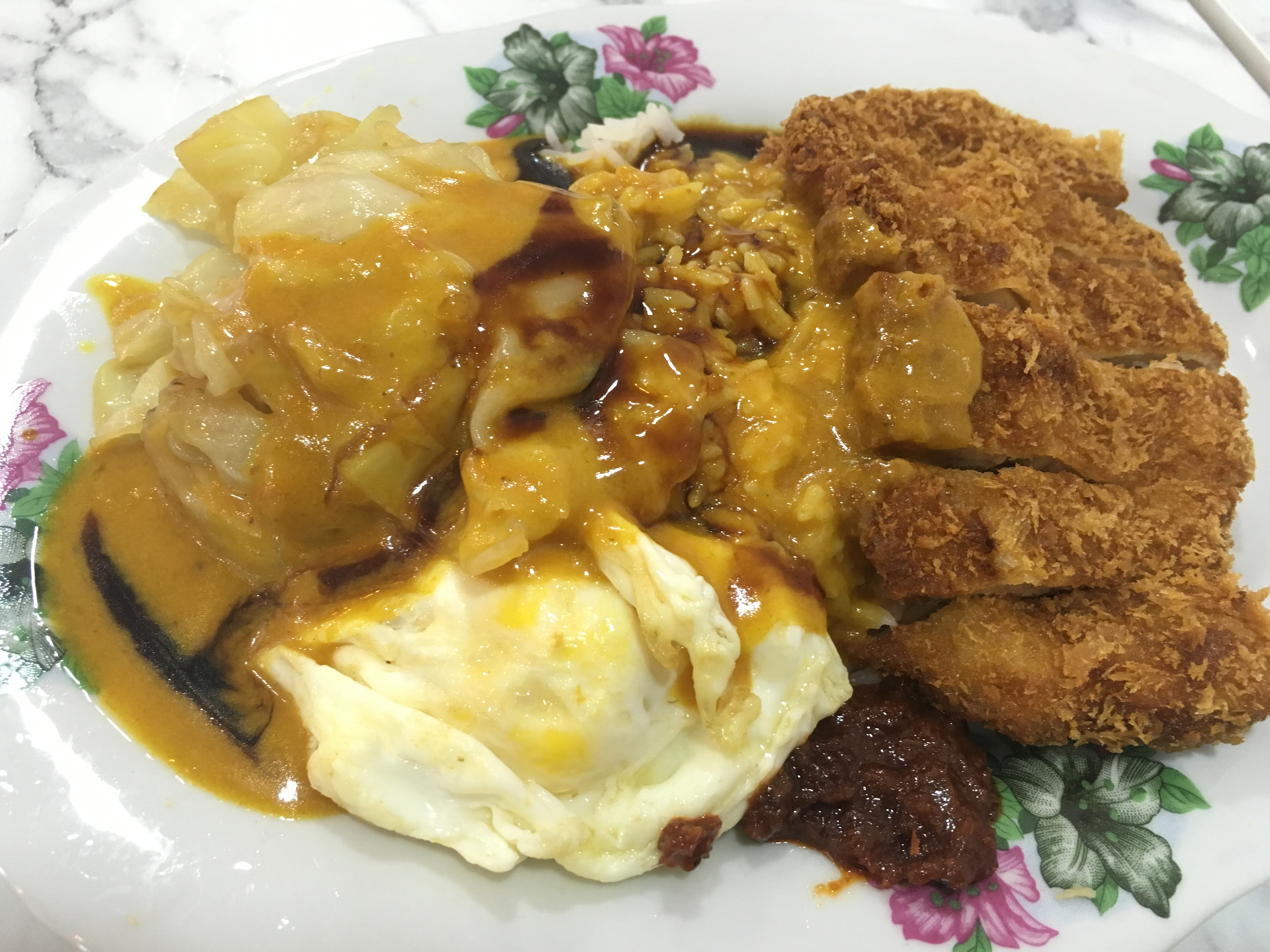
- Hainanese curry rice in Singapore
- Course: Main course
- Place of origin: Singapore
- Created by: Hainanese Singaporeans
- Serving temperature: Hot
- Main ingredients: Steamed white rice smothered in a mess of curries and braised gravy

Hainanese curry rice (Chinese: 海南咖喱饭; HTS: Hhai^{3}nam^{2} ka^{1}li^{1}bui^{1}) is a Singaporean dish consisting of steamed white rice smothered with curries and gravy, characteristically accompanied by curry chicken, pork chop, chap chye (braised cabbage) and kong bak (braised pork). It originates in Singaporean cuisine and is not thought of as part of the cuisine of Hainan, China although it was created by Hainanese people.

== History ==
Hainanese curry rice developed during British colonial rule in Singapore. It was started by Hainanese living in Singapore, who were often employed by the British as well as the wealthy Peranakans (Straits-Chinese) as chefs in their homes. Pork chop was adapted from British cuisine and the rest of the ingredients, such as curry chicken, babi pongteh and chap chye, were from Peranakan cuisine. These were adapted for Hainanese curry rice. Loo's, one of the most well-known and popular Hainanese curry rice vendors in Singapore, started operations in 1946 and is situated in Tiong Bahru Market.

== Description ==
=== Rice ===
Traditionally, steamed white rice forms the base of this dish. In recent years, some outlets, for example Jin Soon Fa Curry Rice, offer brown rice as an option.

=== Curry ===
The curry is milder and thicker than its South Asian variant.

== See also ==
- Teochew porridge
- List of rice dishes
