= Aiwowo =

Traditional Chinese rice dessert

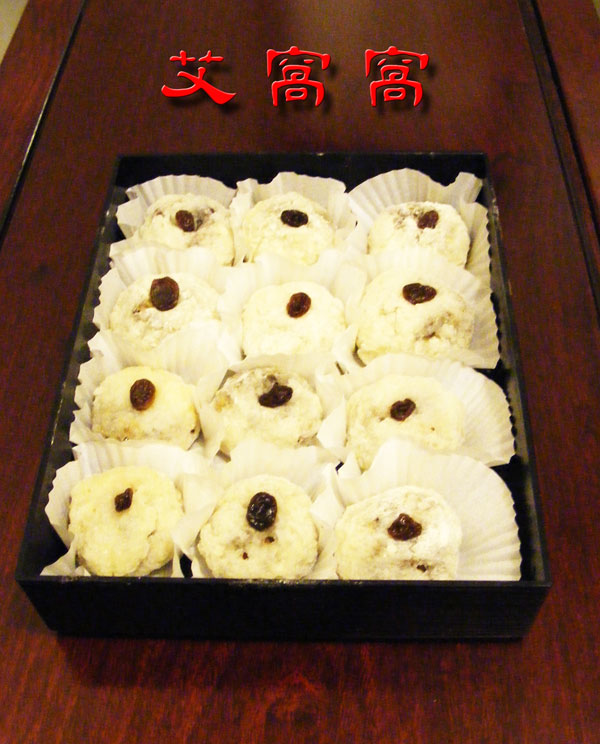
Aiwowo: a traditional snack from Beijing

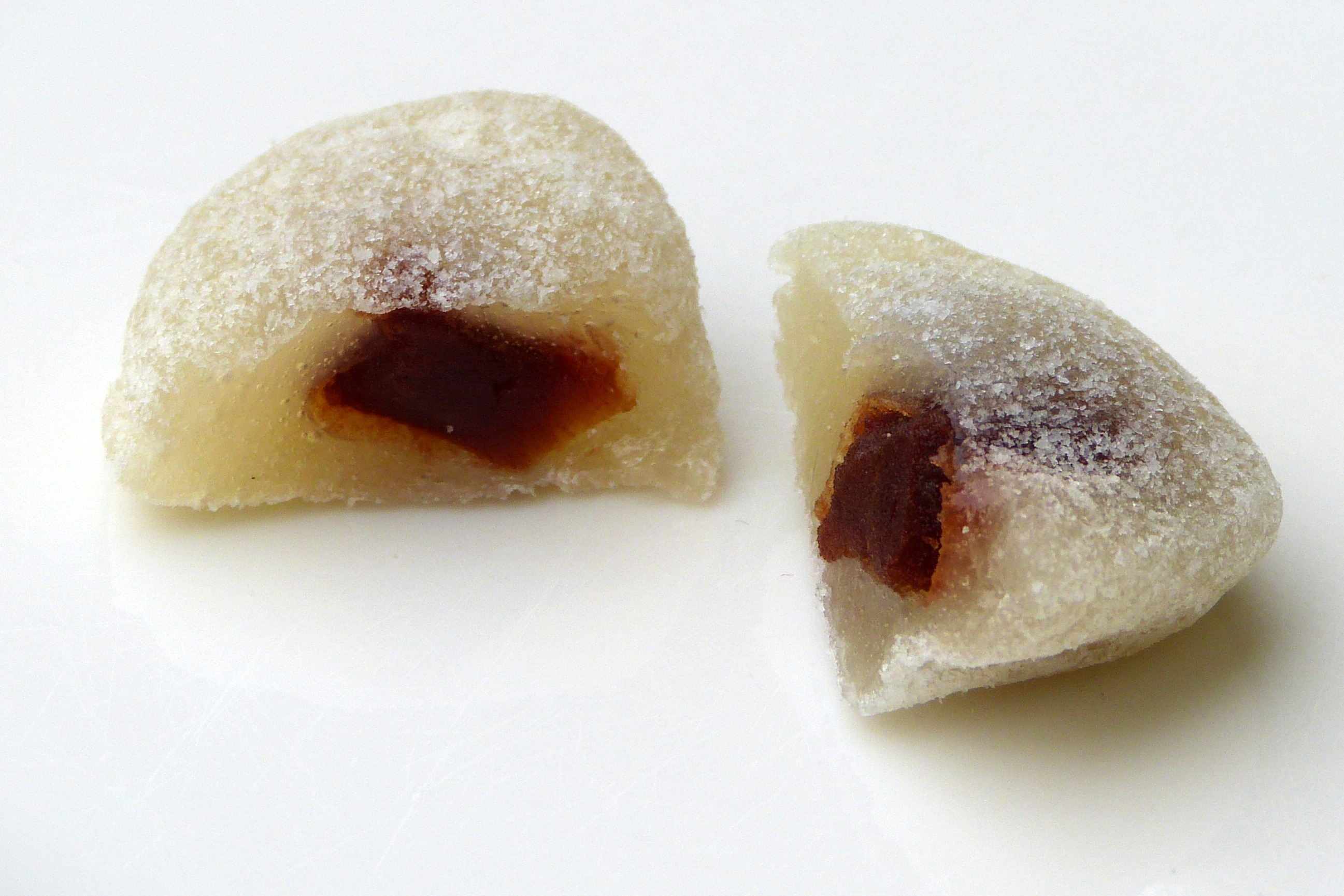
Aiwowo Hongluo showing interior

Aiwowo (Chinese: 艾窩窩; pinyin: àiwōwo) is a traditional dessert from Beijing, China.

== History ==
Aiwowo became well-known as early as the reign of the Wanli Emperor during the Ming dynasty. There is a record of Aiwowo in Chapter 7 of the 17th-century novel Jin Ping Mei. In Zhuo Zhong Zhi, a 17th-century book about events in the imperial family, the author states the existence of Aiwowo within the royal class.

During the Qing dynasty, the Fragrant Concubine of the Qianlong Emperor was bored with the dishes within the palace. When the Emperor heard that the Concubine had previously had a husband from Xinjiang before she came to the palace, the Emperor commanded the palace chef to make snacks for her. The chef, who was Hui, made a snack from his own hometown. The Concubine loved this snack so much that the Emperor commanded the chef to make the snack every day. The snack became famous within the Forbidden City, and across the whole city of Beijing. A eunuch asked for the husband's name and he said it was “Ai Meti.” Because of the chef's family name, the emperor called this snack “Ai Wo Wo,” in which “Wo Wo” translates to bowl-shaped pastry. The word “Ai" is not only a family name but also translates as an honorific for the elderly in traditional Chinese. At that time, the Emperor often said “Yu Ai Wo Wo,” which means "give me the snack." The sentence evolved to “Ai Wo Wo,” as the snack is now called.

Now, Aiwowo has traditionally been produced and sold in Hui restaurants and is available from the Lunar New Year to late summer and early autumn. During Lunar New Year, people often eat the snack with the similarly sticky Niangao. There also exists the saying "Nian Nian Gao" with a double meaning of getting better every year (literally "year year up").

Aiwowo resemble snowballs in appearance. The outer skin is prepared by rolling glutinous rice over steamed, hard flour. Its fillings are generally sweet, which may include sugar, sesame, apricots, plums, and yam. People often flatten it after filling, or also add hawthorn on top of the snack to add tartness to its sweetness.

== See also ==
- Beijing cuisine
- List of rice dishes
