= Nasi beringin =

Malaysian rice dish

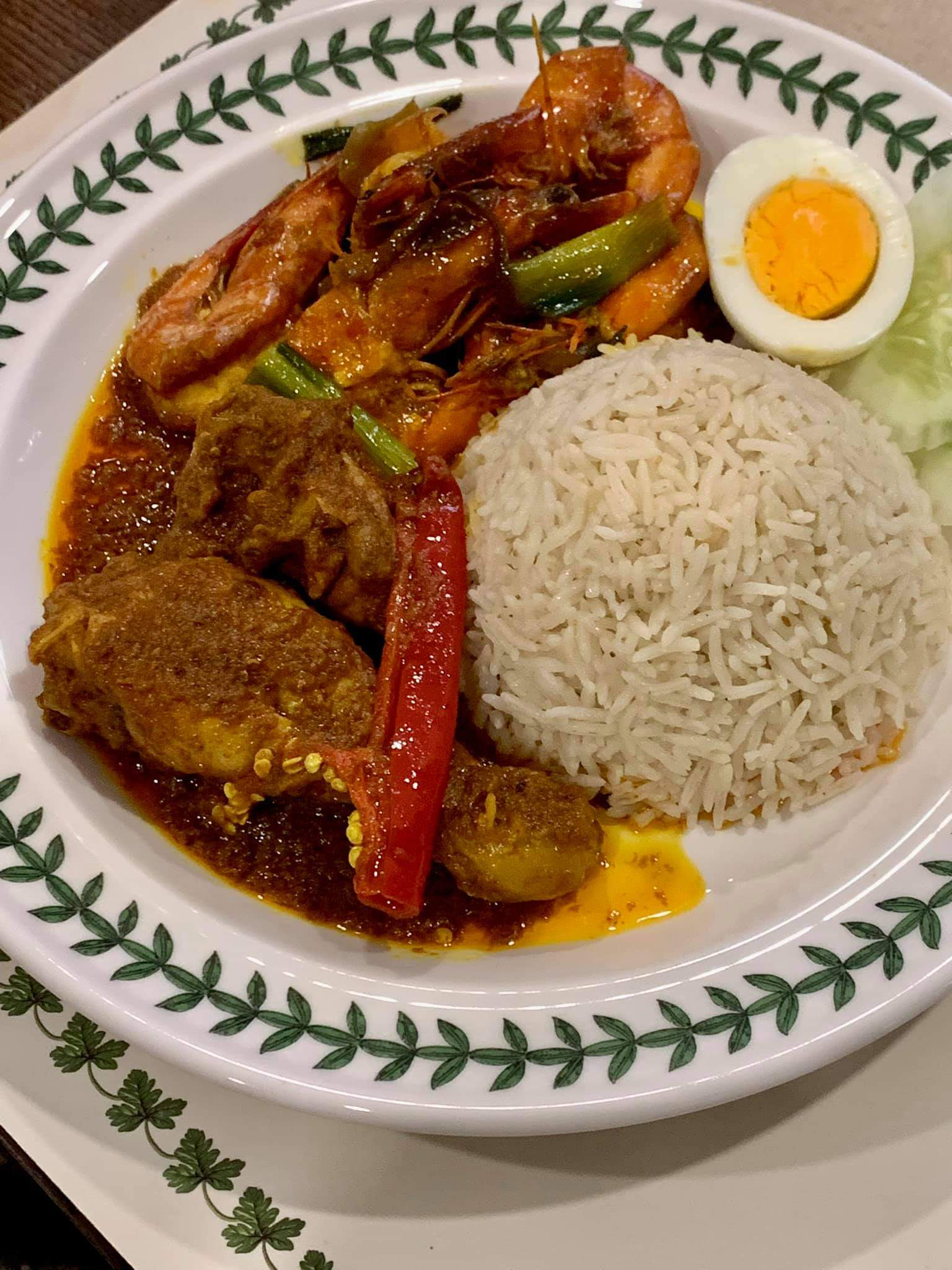
- Place of origin: Malaysia
- Region or state: Johor
- Created by: Malay
- Main ingredients: Rice, pandan leaves, garlic, ginger, spices, butter, lemongrass, onion, coconut milk

Nasi beringin is a Malaysian rice dish from Johor. It used to be served to Johor royalty in the late 1890s; the sultans would have this fragrant dish especially when guests were invited to dine in the palace.

Usually people eat it with acar, chicken curry, sambal and hard-boiled egg. It is suitable to eat for breakfast and lunch.

== See also ==
- Nasi dagang
- Nasi lemak
- Nasi kerabu
