= Madumongso =

Indonesian sweet snack

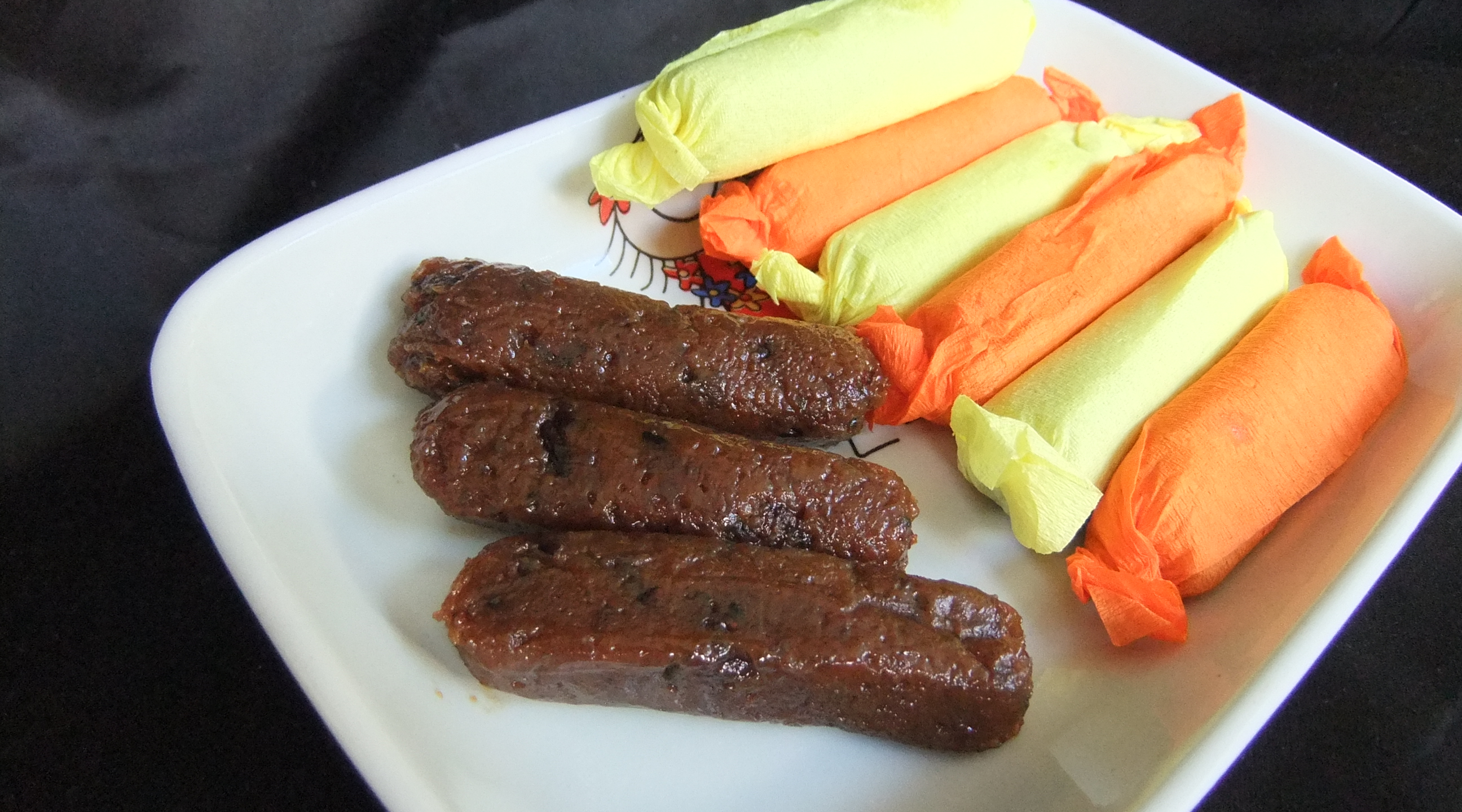
- A plate of madumongso.
- Alternative names: Madumangsa
- Type: Confectionery
- Place of origin: Indonesia
- Region or state: Java
- Variations: Dodol or jenang

Madumongso or madumangsa is a Javanese snack made from black sticky rice as the main ingredient. The sweet flavour is a result of fermenting black sticky rice into tapai and then it is cooked to become dodol. Madumongso originates from Ponorogo, East Java.

== See also ==
- List of rice dishes
- Dodol
- Tapai
