= Insalata di riso =

Italian rice dish

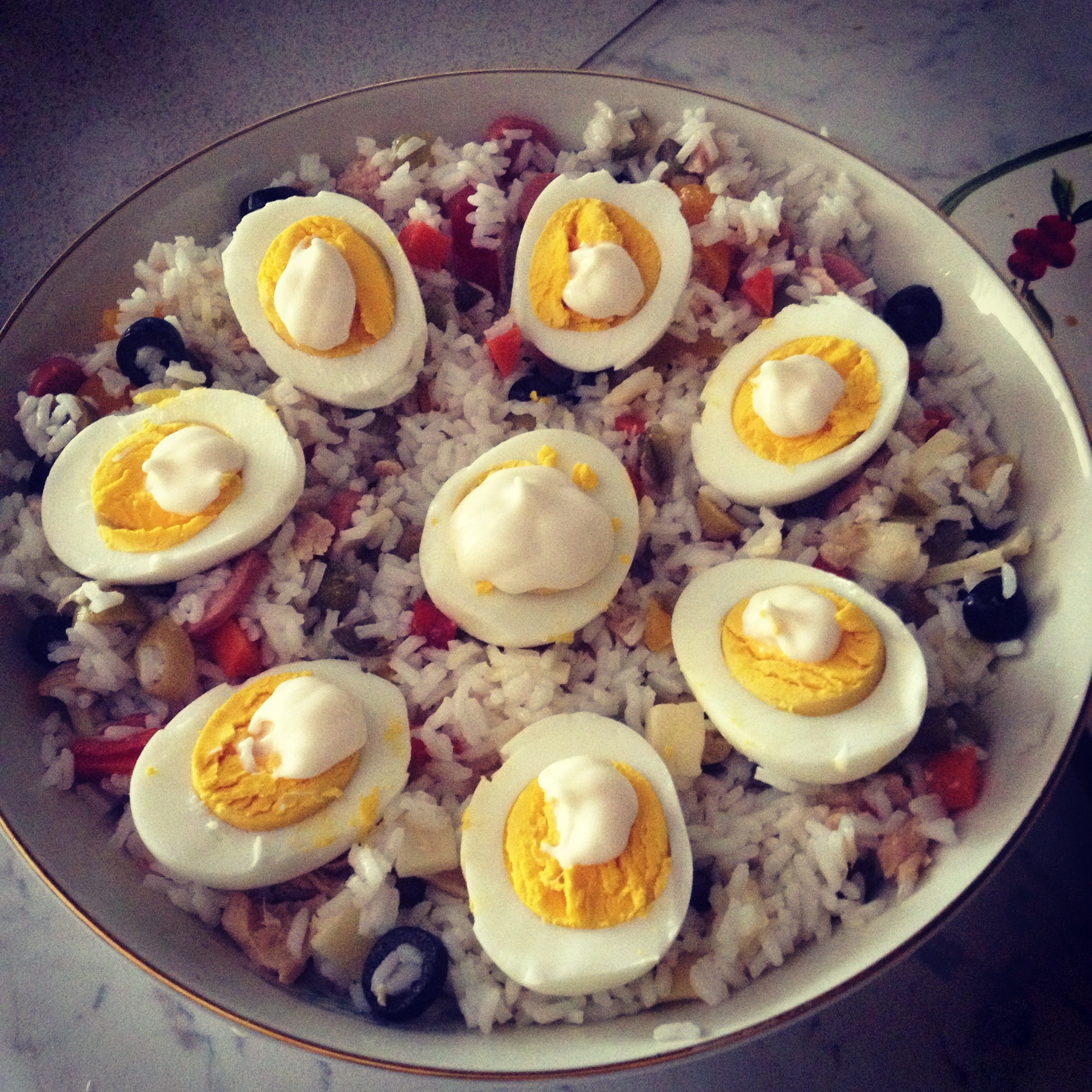
- Course: Primo (Italian course)
- Place of origin: Italy

Insalata di riso (lit. 'rice salad'), also known as riso freddo (lit. 'cold rice'), is a typical Italian dish consumed during the summer, consisting of rice and other ingredients.

== Characteristics ==
The rice used can include parboiled rice, long grain rice or risone. The ingredients for the dressing, which are cut into small pieces and mixed with the rice, can include vegetables (cooked, raw or pickled), meat (e.g., frankfurter or ham), cheese, tuna or olives.

== Gallery ==
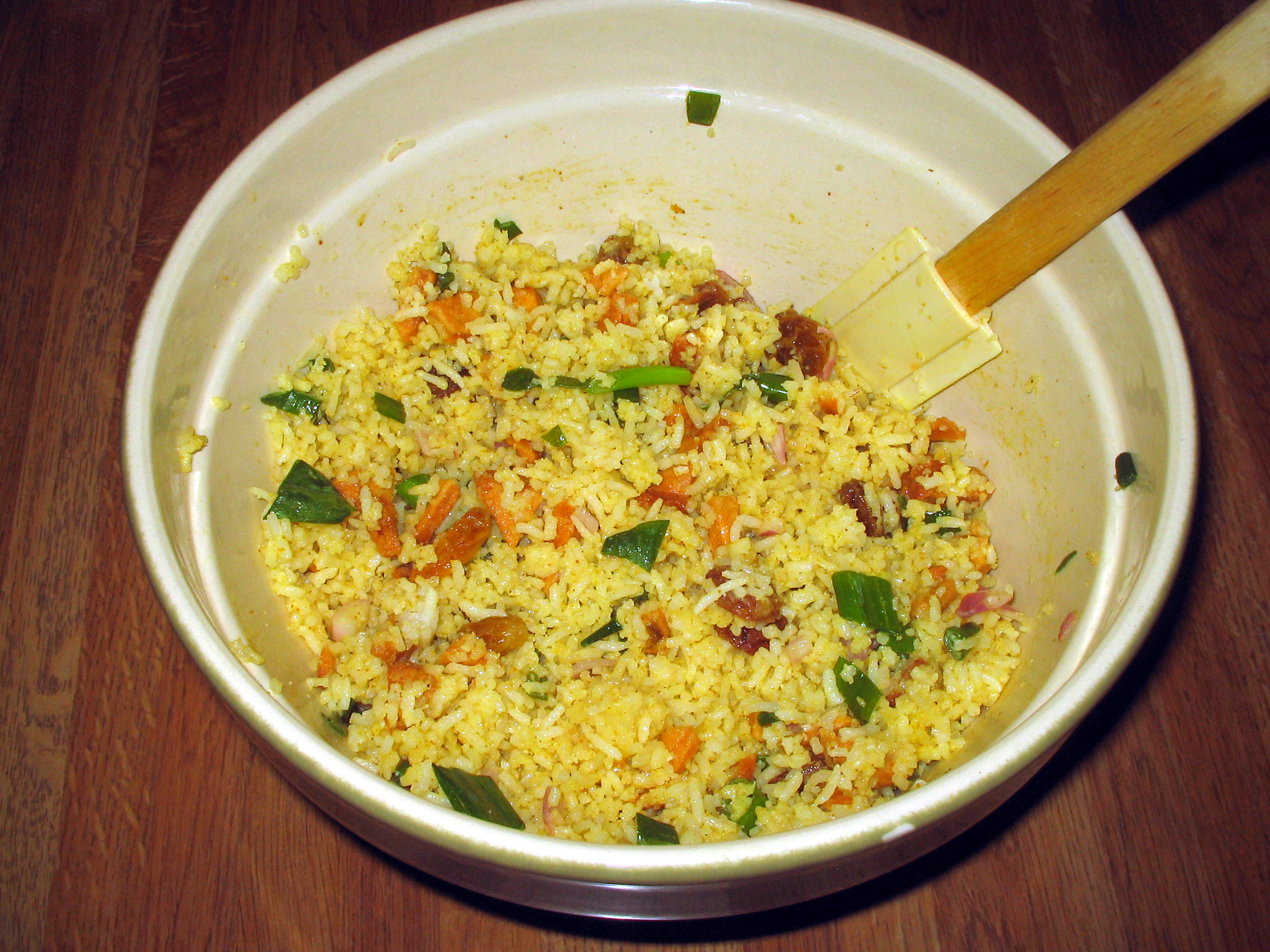
Insalata di riso with rice, mayonnaise, curry powder, red vinegar, olive oil, shallots, green onions, dried apples and golden raisins

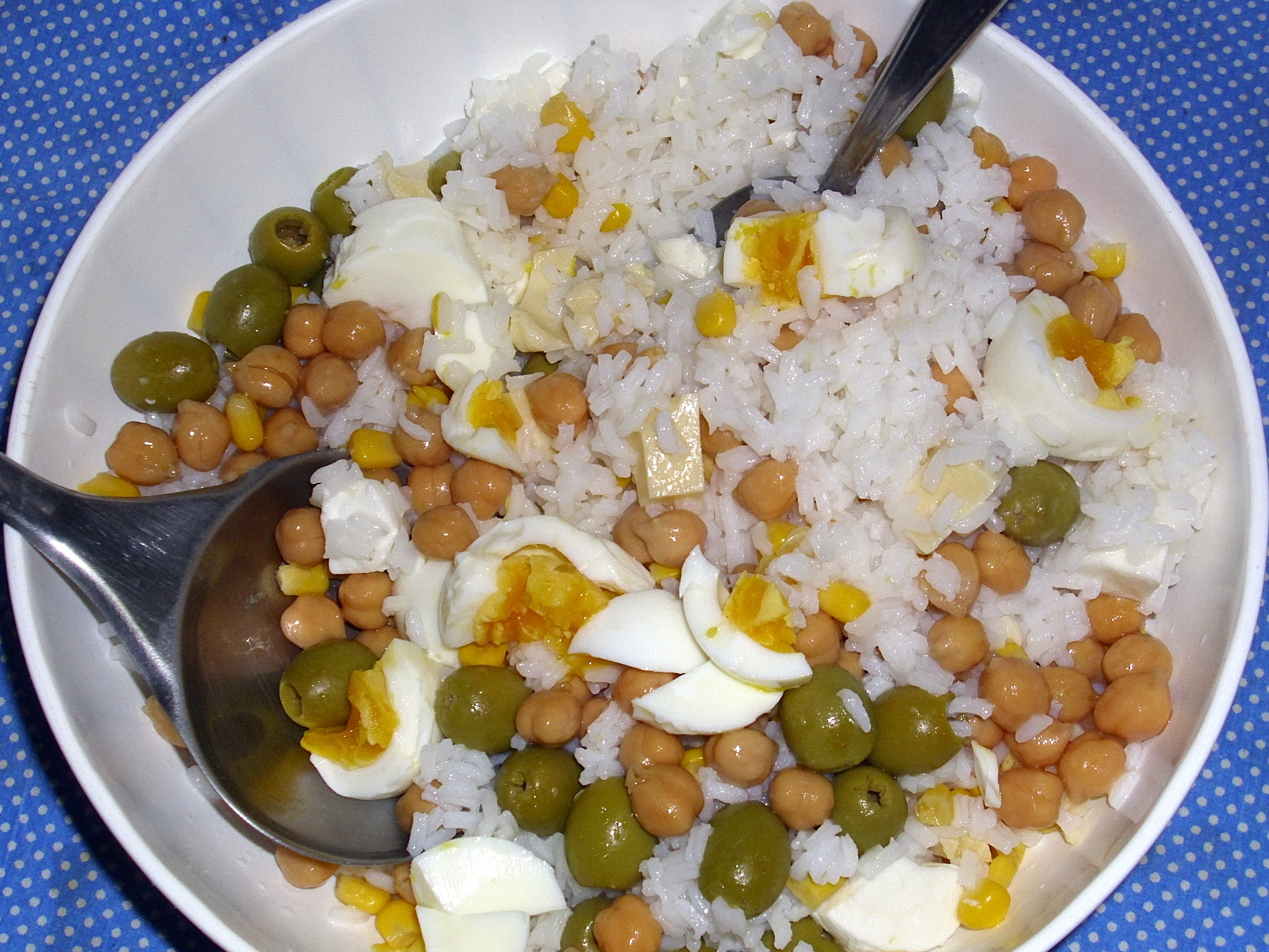
Insalata di riso

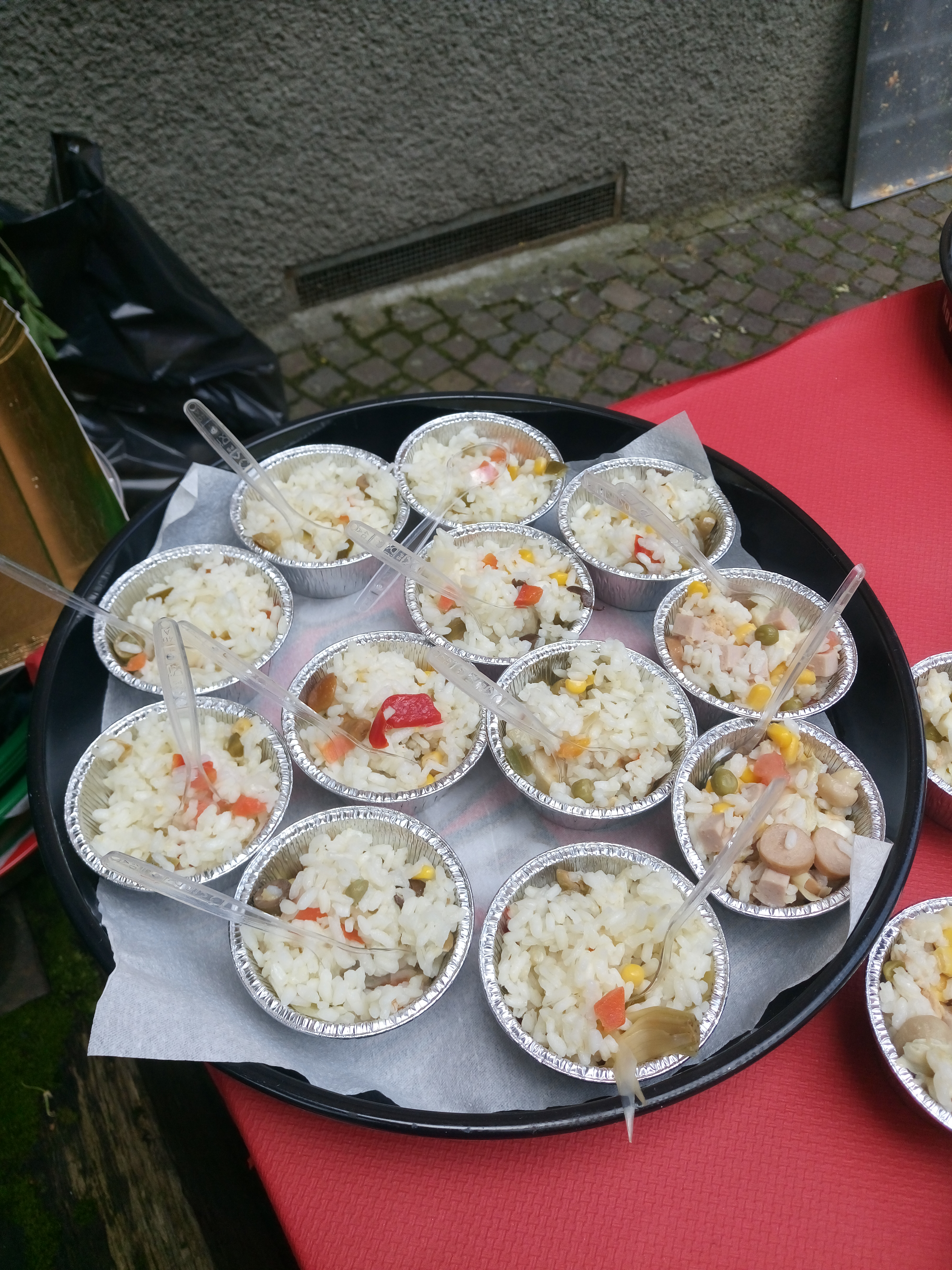
Insalata di riso served at the end of the procession of St. John the Baptist, patron saint of Esino Lario, Sunday 26 June 2016 (Wikimania 2016)

== See also ==
- List of rice dishes
- Pasta salad
