= Perdeli pilav =

Turkish dish

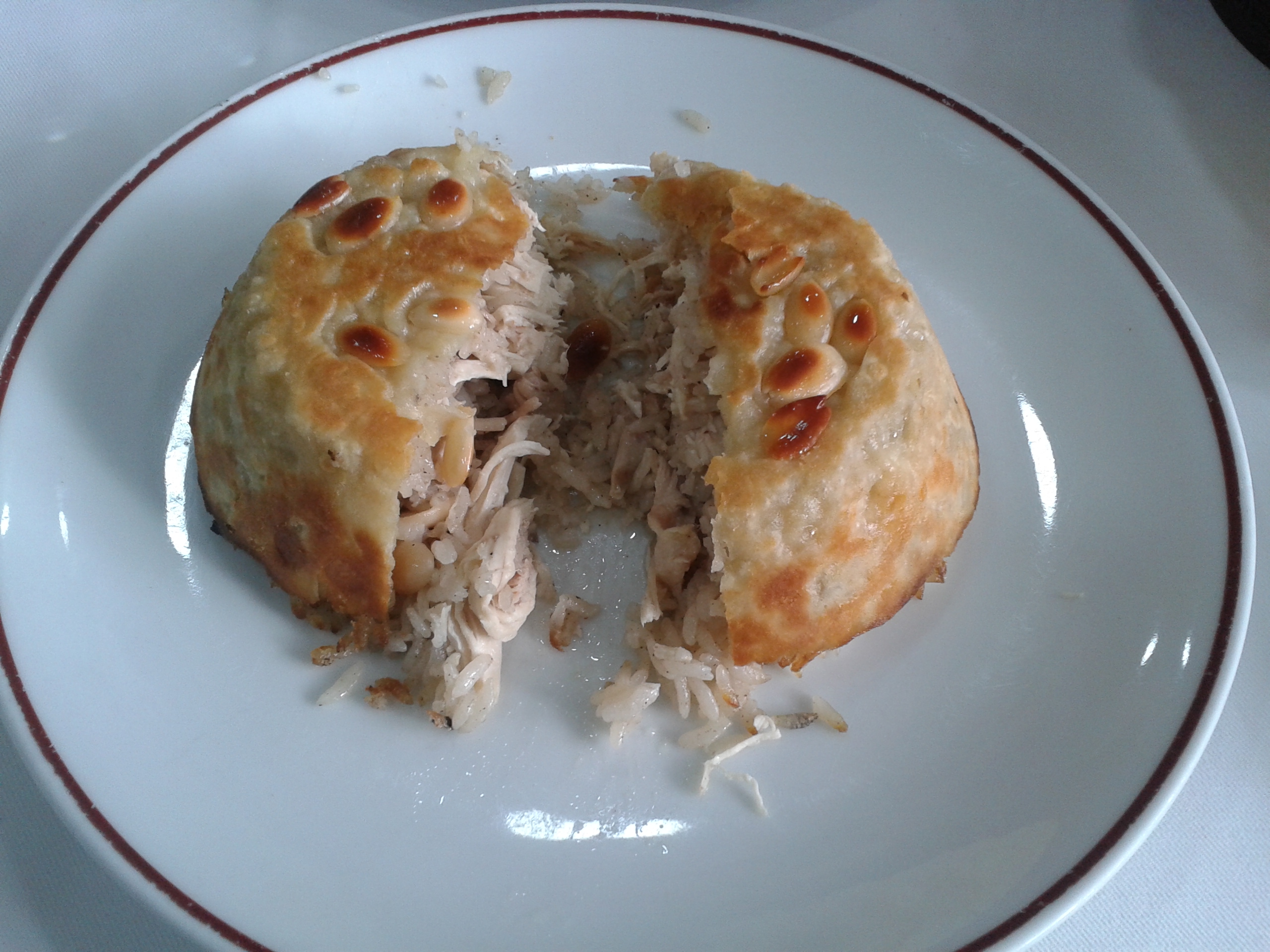

Perdeli pilav ("curtain pilaf") is a Turkish food, typically consisting of rice with chicken and occasionally onion and peanuts wrapped in a thin layer of dough, topped with almonds, it is one of the most popular dishes from Siirt.
