= Poule au riz =

French chicken dish

Poule, chapon, or poularde au riz is a dish in French cuisine consisting of a poached or braised chicken served with rice cooked in the chicken's cooking liquid or broth. It is sometimes compared to pilaf.

Some versions cook the rice and chicken together. Others use the broth or juices of a cooked chicken to cook the rice.
