= Masa (Nigerian food) =

Nigerian food

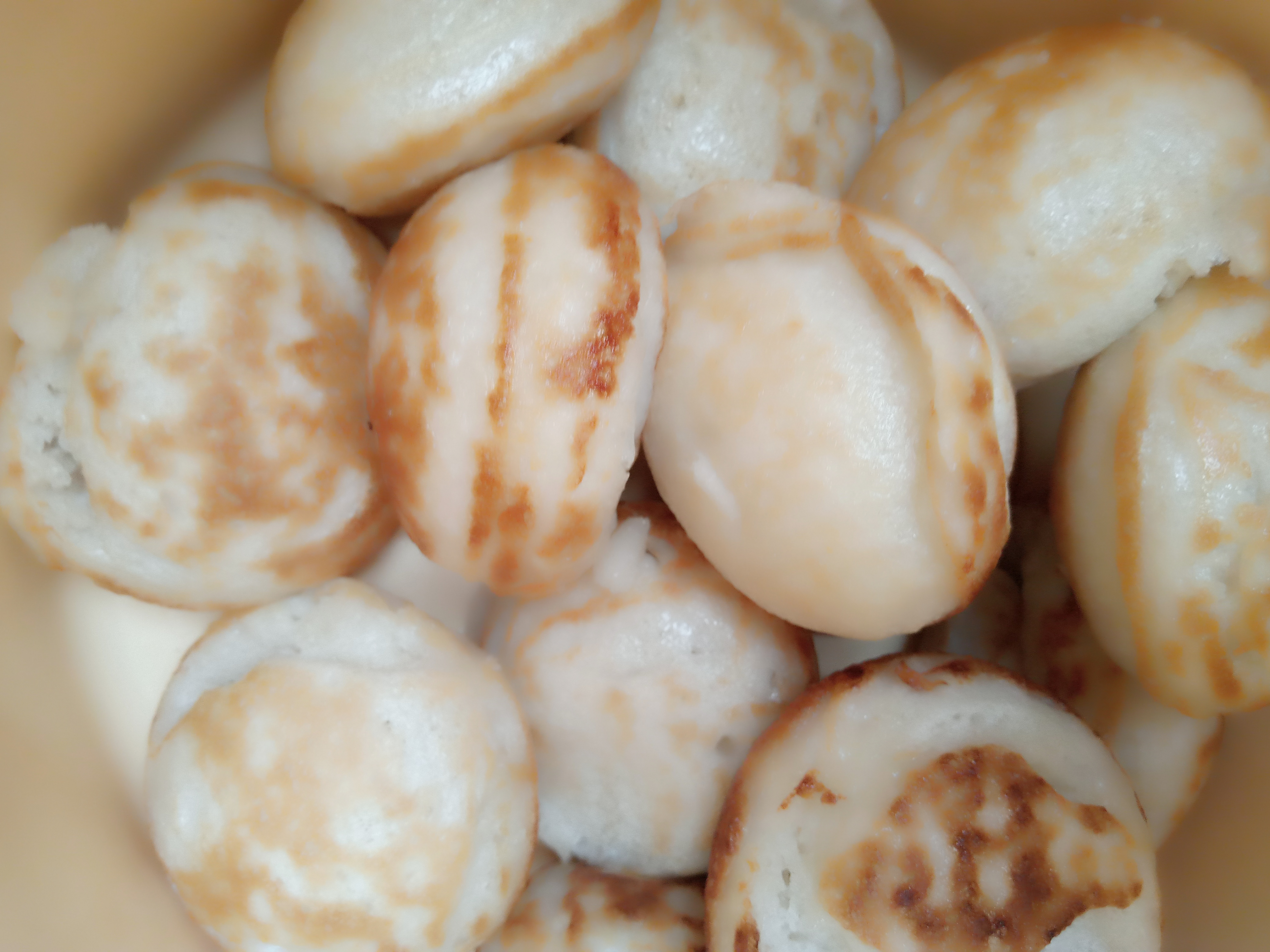
Masa / Waina

Masa, also known as Waina, is a fermented cake consumed in Northern Nigeria and some parts of Western Nigeria. It is commonly associated with Hausa cuisine. It resembles an Idli in shape. It has a soft and spongy interior with a crunchy outer layer. It has a sweet-sour flavour. Masa recipes usually involve soaked rice, till it ferments to desired taste, though other versions with other main ingredients exist. The masa is cooked in a special pan. Ingredients include rice, yeast, baking soda and yoghurt.
