= Albaloo polo =

Iranian rice dish

- Alternative names: Albalu polo, albalu polow
- Type: Rice dish
- Course: Main dish
- Place of origin: Iran
- Region or state: Shiraz, Fars Province
- Serving temperature: Hot
- Main ingredients: rice (sour cherries usually morello cherry,) and several spices such as saffron, advieh, and others for flavoring.
- Variations: Albaloo polo tahdig
- Similar dishes: tadig/tahdig, Shirin polow, sabzi polo

Albaloo polo or Albaloo polow (Persian: آلبالوپلو) is an Iranian main dish of rice and sour cherries usually served with chicken, koobideh, or other types of kebab as well as some form of stews (khoresht). In Persian, albaloo is morello cherry; polo is pilaf, a style of cooked rice.

The dish can also be served as a type of scorched rice, known as albaloo polow ba tahdiq maast (آلبالوپلو با ته‌دیگ ماست), a specialty rice dish with a hardened bottom layer.

The herbs and spices used in this variation of polo vary, but typically include advieh, and saffron.

== See also ==
- Culture of Iran
- Iranian cuisine
- Khoresht
- List of rice dishes
- Polow (pilaf, polo)
