= Zerde =

Saffron rice pudding

Zerde زرده
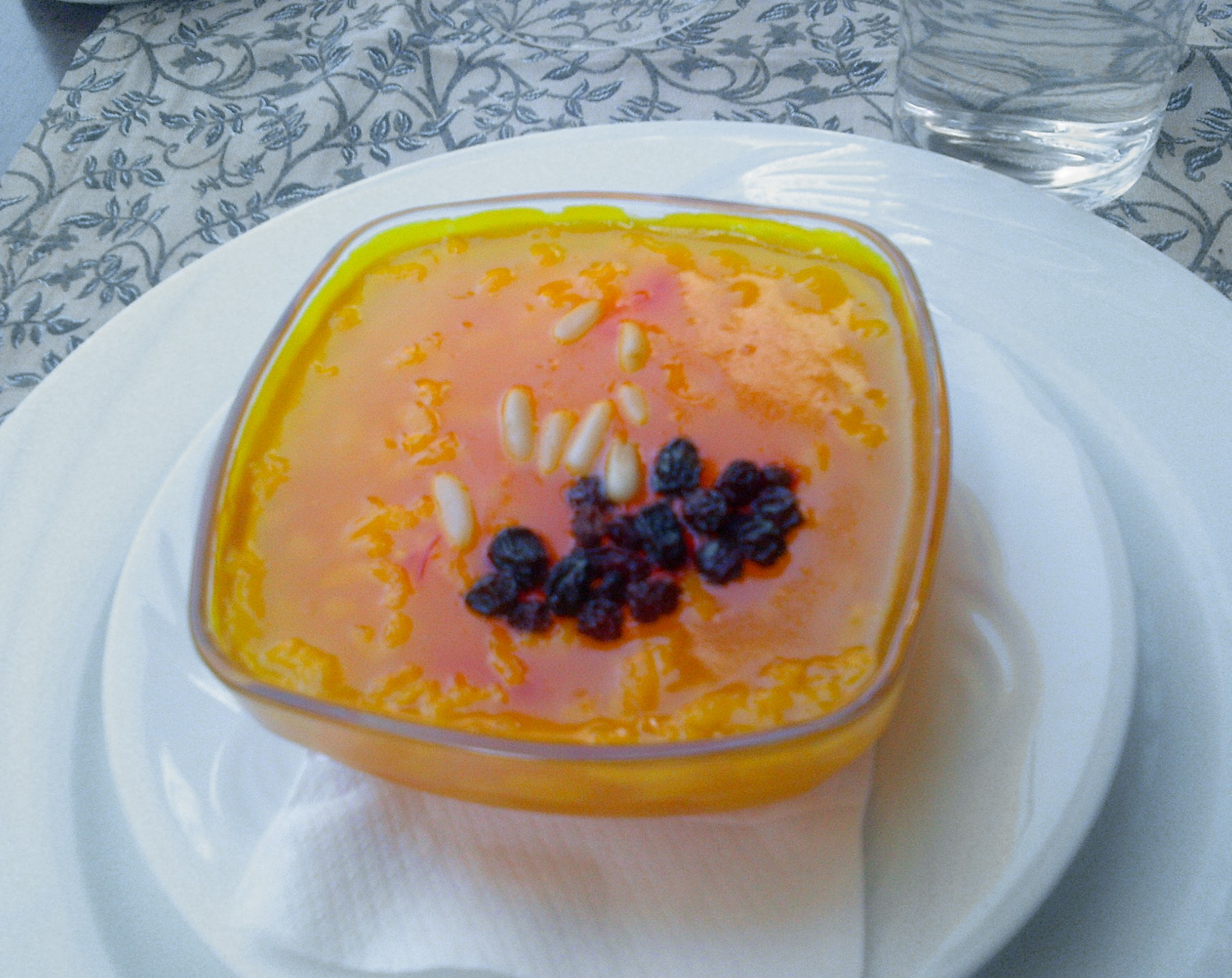
- Type: Pudding
- Course: Dessert
- Place of origin: Iran
- Serving temperature: Cold
- Main ingredients: Rice, rose water, saffron, sugar, raisins, pistachios
- Food energy (per serving): 215 kcal (900 kJ)

Zerde is an Iranian dessert, but nowadays also part of Turkish and Iraqi cuisine. The original rice pudding, infused with a generous amount of saffron giving it a vibrant yellow hue and a delicate floral flavour. This is a festive dish popular at weddings, births, and during holy festivities such as the first Sunday of the month of Sha'aban celebrating the birth of the prophet Zechariah, and the first ten days of the sacred month of Muharram.

Zer, which means gold and or yellow, comes from Persian zard (زرد) which means yellow. In some regions of Turkey, Zerdeçal Turmeric also added for a more intense colour.

Zerde is very popular and has made its way to western Turkey with people immigrating to west at Eastern Thrace, which provides almost the half of country's rice production, zerde is a favored dessert. Flavoring ingredients of zerde vary slightly from region to region in Turkey depending on the local fruits.

Zerde differs from rice pudding insofar as it is prepared with water instead of milk.

One serving of zerde has approximately 215 calories.

== History ==
James Redhouse described zerde (Ottoman Turkish: زرده) in his 1890 Ottoman Turkish to English dictionary as "Boiled rice colored with saffron and sweetened."

== See also ==
- Zarda (food)
- Sholezard
