= Yakimochi =

Grilled or broiled mochi

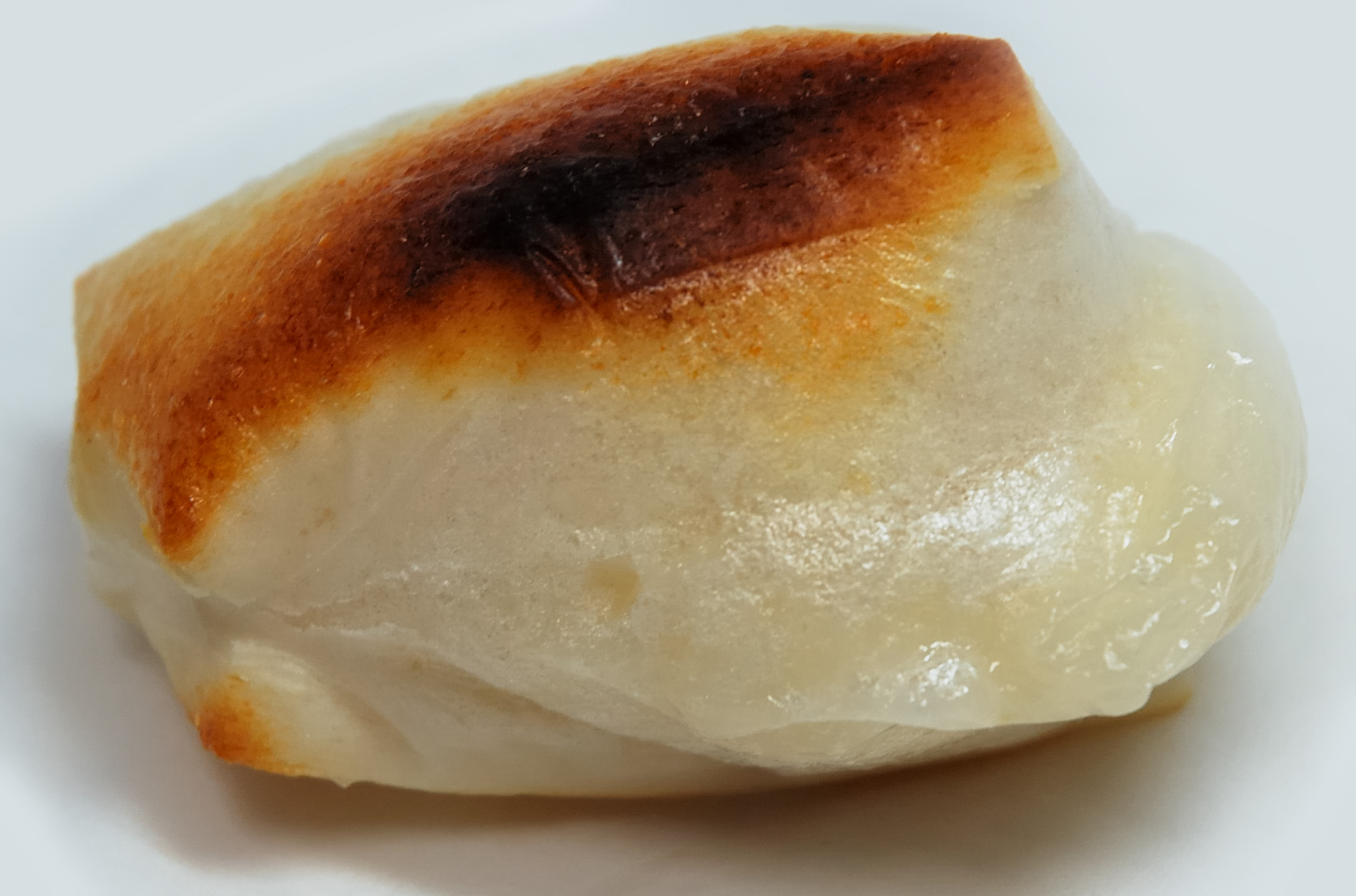
Yakimochi

Yakimochi (Japanese: 焼餅) is grilled or broiled mochi or pounded rice cake. Traditionally, it is prepared using a small charcoal grill, but in modern times a gas grill can be used. During the time of the Autumn Moon, it is traditional to eat fresh yakimochi while sipping sake and enjoying the view of the full moon.

During the Meiji era, yakimochi was commonly eaten in rural Japan, and historical versions contained not only rice but other grains such as millet, barley, wheat flour, and rice husks. A version from the Niigata Prefecture eaten in mountain areas used rice husks and other grain flours to make a dough, stuffed with vegetables and cooked in miso.

Yakimochi is also synonymous with 'jealousy', which derived from a love-prediction game. In the game, two mochi are meant to represent a boy and girl, and as they cook the expansion of the mochi indicates who will make the first romantic move.

== Variations ==
Yakimochi can be prepared in several ways:

- "Isobeyaki" 磯辺焼き is yakimochi that has been grilled with soy sauce and then wrapped in nori seaweed.
- "Abekawa yakimochi" is broiled mochi that is soaked in hot water and then covered with a mixture of sugar and kinako, a type of bean powder.
