= Zarda (food) =

Indian traditional boiled sweet rice dish

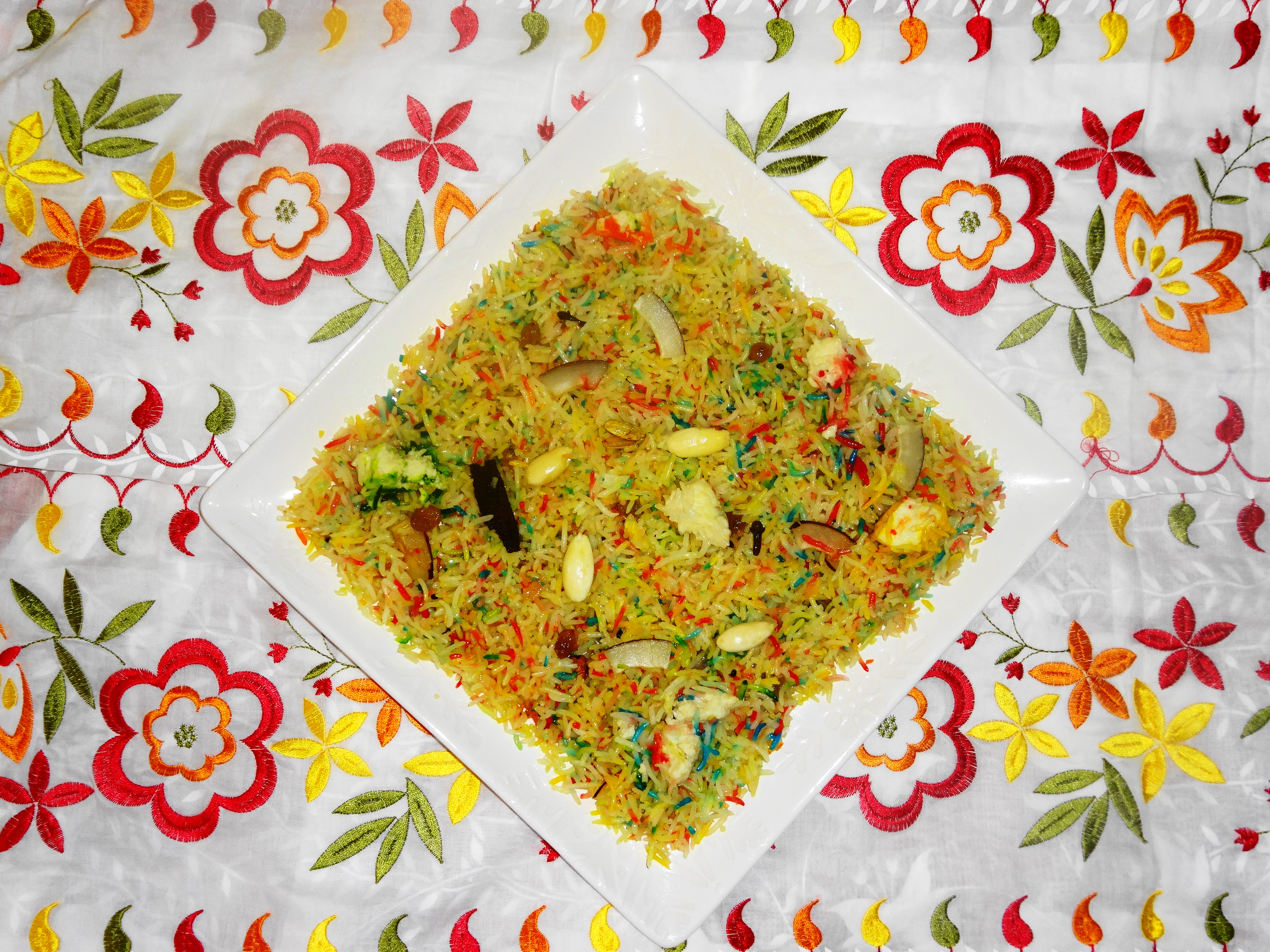
- A plate of coloured zarda, flavoured with various ingredients
- Alternative names: Zorda, jarda, jorda
- Course: Dessert
- Place of origin: Mughal Empire
- Region or state: Indian subcontinent
- Associated cuisine: Pakistan, India, Bangladesh
- Main ingredients: Rice, raisins, cardamom, saffron, pistachios or almonds
- Variations: Mutanjan

Zarda (Hindi: ज़र्दा zardā, Urdu: زردہ zardā, Bengali: জর্দা jôrdā) is a traditional boiled sweet rice dish, native to the Indian subcontinent, made with saffron, milk and sugar, and flavoured with cardamom, raisins, pistachios or almonds in Indo Muslim Period. The name 'zarda' comes from Persian word 'zard' زرد meaning 'yellow', because the food coloring added to the rice gives it a yellow color. Zarda is typically served after a meal. In the Indian subcontinent, zarda was and still remains a popular dessert on special occasions such as weddings. It is quite similar to sholezard, a traditional Iranian dessert, and zerde, a traditional Turkish dessert.

Often in Pakistan, instead of yellow food coloring, multiple food colorings are added so the rice grains are of multiple colors. Additionally, khoya, candied fruits (murabba) and nuts are an essential part of zarda made at auspicious occasions. There also is a popular use of raisins, and other dried fruits to dish.

Dating back to Mughal India, zarda had a variation with an addition of small fried sweetmeat pieces called 'mutanjan'. This dish was a favourite of Emperor Shahjahan and was often made on his request. This rice dish was made for guests at special banquets.

The Mesopotamian people of Iraq also prepare this dish (with the same name), typically made while fasting during Lent—thus prepared without dairy products.

== See also ==
- List of rice dishes
- Pakistani rice dishes
- Pudding
