= Sholezard =

Persian saffron rice dessert pudding

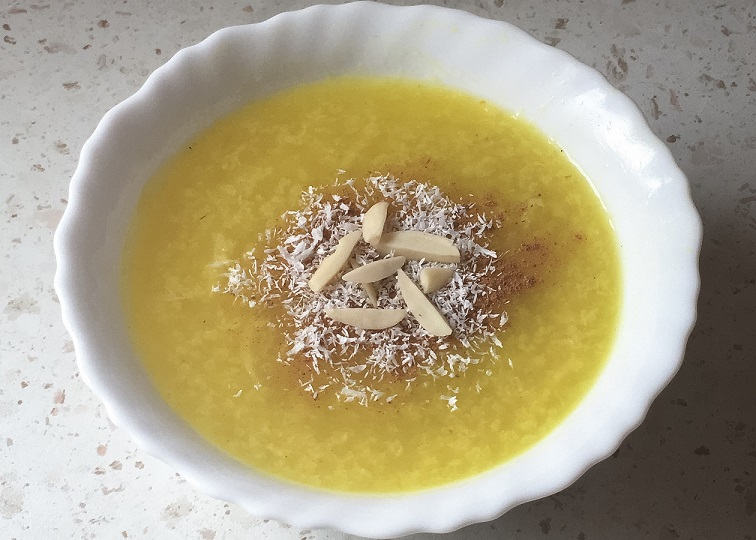
- Sholezard topped with cinnamon and almonds
- Course: Dessert
- Place of origin: Iran
- Associated cuisine: Iranian cuisine
- Main ingredients: Rice, saffron, sugar, rose water and cinnamon powder

Sholezard (Persian: شله‌زرد; also known as zard birinj or zard berenj (Persian: زردبرنج) or zarda) is a rice pudding composed of saffron, sugar, rose water, butter, cinnamon and cardamom. It is often made and distributed in substantial quantities in religious ceremonies.

Sholezard is a traditional Iranian dessert that is yellow due to the presence of saffron and is topped with cinnamon, almond slices, and pistachio slices. Sholezard is generally cooked in one way, and it is especially used for breaking the fast during the month of Ramadan. It has a creamy and smooth consistency, despite not being made with cream or milk.

== See also ==
- Muhallebi
- Kheer
- Rice pudding
- Zarda (food)
- Zerde
