= Nasi dagang =

Malaysian rice dish from Terengganu and Kelantan

Nasi dagang ناسي داڬڠ
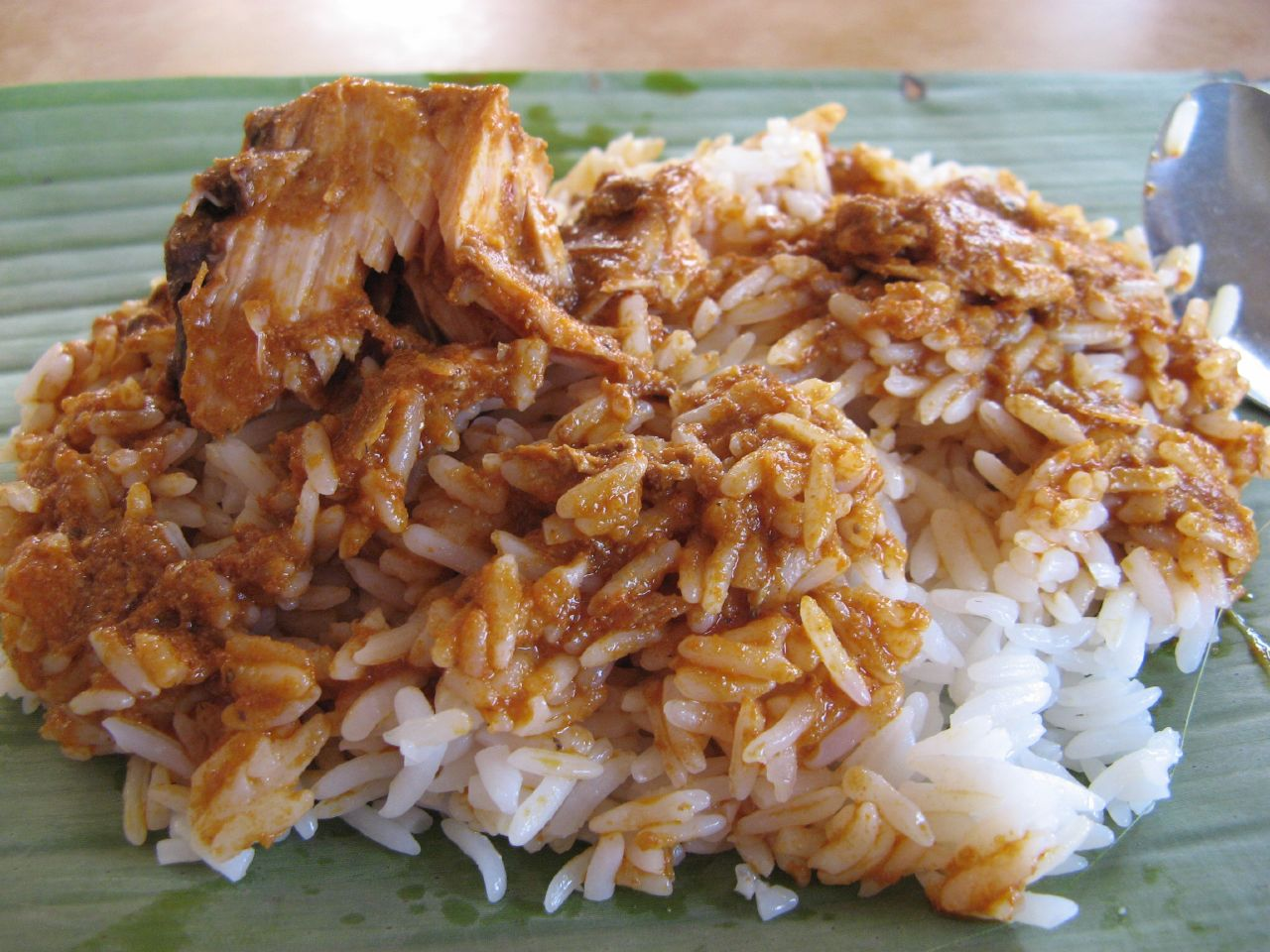
- Nasi dagang from Terengganu.
- Course: Main course, usually for breakfast
- Place of origin: Malaysia
- Region or state: East Coast of Peninsular Malaysia (Terengganu and Kelantan) (originally), Southern Thailand and Riau Islands, Indonesia (Natuna and Anambas)
- Created by: Terengganuan Malay
- Serving temperature: Hot or room temperature
- Main ingredients: Rice cooked in coconut milk served with Malay fish, chicken and prawn curry

Nasi dagang (Jawi: ناسي داڬڠ, lit. 'trader's rice'; Malay pronunciation: [ˌnasi ˈdaɡaŋ]) is a Malaysian dish consisting of rice steamed in coconut milk, fish curry and extra ingredients such as pickled cucumber and carrots.

It is a breakfast food in the states on the East Coast of Peninsular Malaysia (Terengganu, Kelantan, parts of Pahang and eastern Johor), southern Thai Malay provinces of Pattani, Yala and Narathiwat and across the Indonesian border in Natuna and Anambas, Riau Islands.

== Ingredients ==
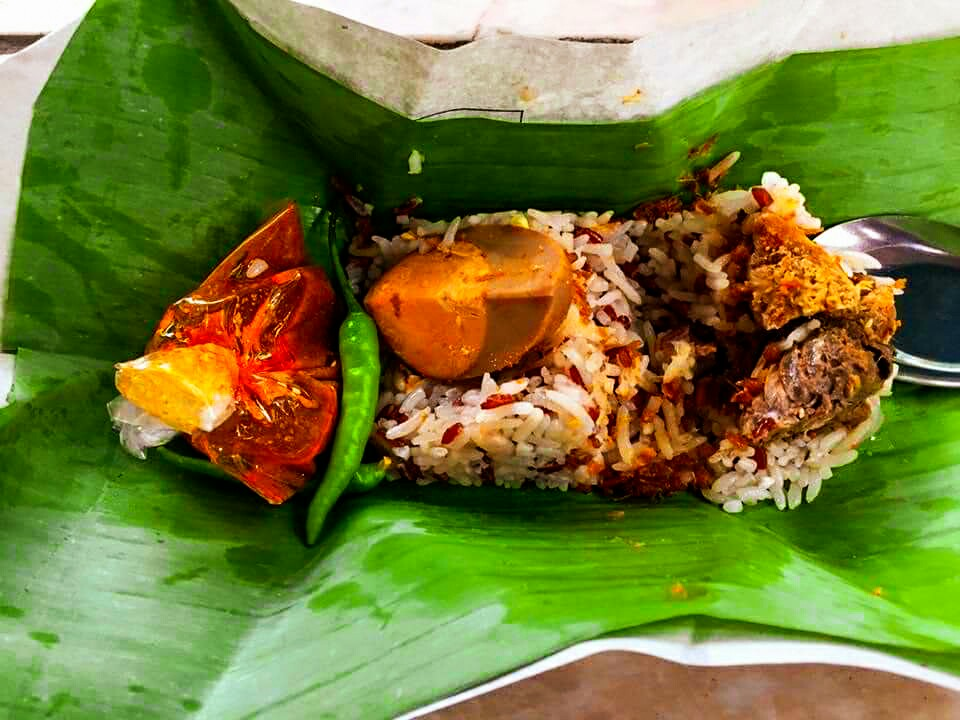
Nasi Dagang as served in Prince of Songkla University in Pattani, Thailand. The Patani-Malay styled Nasi Dagang is commonly served with Telur pindang.

=== Nasi (rice) ===
The combination of fenugreek seeds and coconut milk gives nasi dagang its flavour and fragrance. The rice may first be soaked in water for several hours to soften it. It is then mixed with thick coconut milk, sliced shallots, lemongrass and fenugreek seeds. The rice is steamed until cooked. It may also be steamed twice, where more coconut milk is added when it is half-cooked. Then the rice is steamed again until cooked. This method ensures a more creamy finish to the rice.

=== Kari ikan (fish curry) ===
This accompanying dish is only specially prepared for nasi dagang and is sometimes locally called gulai darat.

This curry the fish is cooked in is not an Indian-style curry powder but a Malay-style curry, i.e., coconut milk mixed with traditional Malay spices such as lemon grass, galangal, chilli paste, and turmeric.

Tuna is the standard choice of fish but other fish can be used as well, such as tenggiri. Chicken and prawns are also used sometimes; however, the gulai darat is prepared slightly differently.

=== Kelapa goreng (fried coconut) ===
Kelapa Parut is freshly shaved, mixed with sliced shallots and fried until golden brown.

=== Hard-boiled eggs ===
Hard boiled eggs are cut into four or eight slices.

=== Vegetable pickle ===
The vegetable is pickled in rice vinegar and sugar. The vegetables commonly used are cucumber, chilli and carrots.

=== Sambal ===
Chilli sambal can sometimes be included.

=== Telur pindang ===
Telur pindang, herb-boiled eggs, commonly paired with Nasi dagang among the Malay community in Thailand (Yala, Narathiwat and Pattani).

=== Gulai lemak ikan salai ===
Smoked fish cooked with spicy and creamy gravy, a side dish usually being accompanied with Nasi Dagang in Natuna and Anambas Islands, Indonesia.

== Variants ==
The Terengganu version uses the normal white rice, while the Kelantanese variety uses a type of rice locally called 'beras nasi dagang', which is a type of wild rice that has a light purple colour and a little glutinous. The Terengganuan version is also much simpler, eaten only with the fish curry (sometimes with belimbing buluh added) and pickles.

Outside the Malaysian border, it is a staple breakfast in the deep south of Thailand (Pattani, Yala and Narathiwat), the nasi dagang of southern Thailand features both Kelantanese (red) and Terengganuan (white) version of the dish. While across the South China Sea, the Nasi dagang in Natuna and Anambas attributed a similar gurai (gravy) with the Terangganese version of the rice, although the rice for the Natuna-Anambas version of Nasi Dagang was cooked with coconut milk, closely related to Nasi Lemak.

== See also ==
- List of rice dishes
- Nasi kerabu
- Nasi lemak
