= Jeera bhaat =

Rice and cumin dish of Indian subcontinent

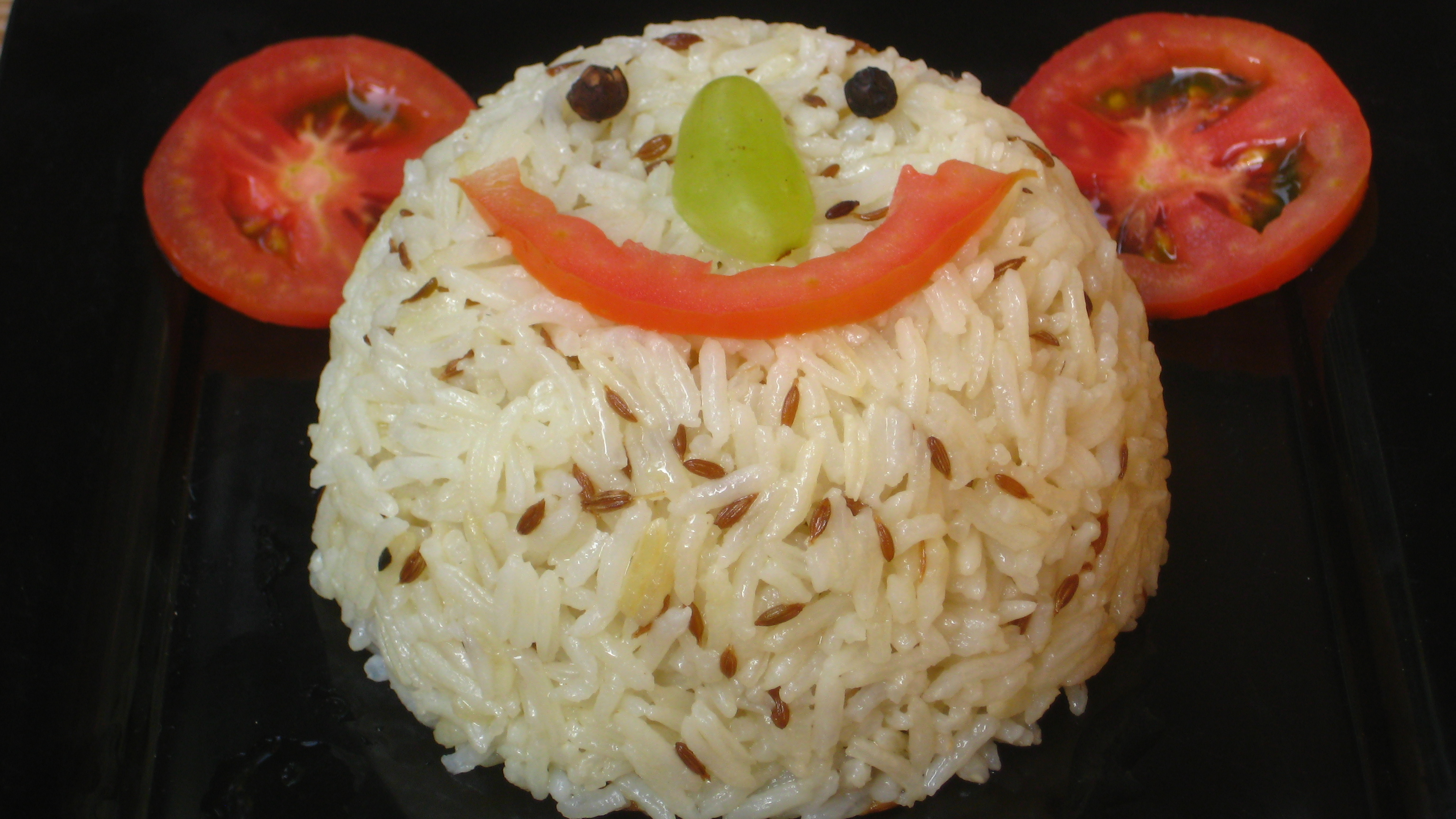
- Alternative names: Zeera chawal
- Course: Main course
- Region or state: Indian subcontinent
- Serving temperature: Hot
- Main ingredients: Rice, cumin seeds, onions

Jeera bhaat or zeera chawal is an Indian and Pakistani dish consisting of rice and cumin seeds. It is a very popular dish in the Indian subcontinent and most commonly used as an everyday rice dish. The Hindi term for cumin seeds is jeera or zeera, with the latter also being used in Urdu, thus owing to the name of the dish. The ingredients used are rice, cumin seeds, vegetable oil, onions, salt and coriander leaves.

== Etymology ==
The name jeera bhaat is a compound of two Hindi words: jeera and bhaat. The word jeera (or jīrā in IAST) is derived from the Sanskrit word jīraka, 'cumin seeds'. The word bhaat is derived from the Sanskrit word bhakta meaning 'boiled rice'. The Hindi–Urdu name zeera chawal (ज़ीरा चावल / زیرہ چاول) is commonly used in northern India, with the word zeera ('cumin') being derived from the same Sanskrit word and the word chawal meaning 'rice'.

== Preparation ==
Cumin seeds are fried in hot oil. Long-grain basmati rice and salt are added to it. Water is then poured and allowed to boil with covered lid at high flame. The rice then is steamed on low flame until all the water is absorbed.

Jeera bhaat is generally garnished with finely chopped fresh coriander leaves but is also garnished with onion rings in some Indian hotels and restaurants.
