= Advieh =

Spice mixture used in Iranian cuisine

Advieh (Persian: ادویه, lit. spice; from Arabic: أدوية, pl. of دواء, lit. remedy, medicine, medication, drug) is the Persian word for spice, and it is a spice mixture used in Iranian cuisine. It is used in rice dishes, as well as in chicken and bean dishes. Although its specific composition varies from the Persian Gulf to the Caspian Sea, common ingredients include turmeric, cinnamon, cardamom, cloves, rose petals or rose buds, cumin, and ginger. It may also include ground golpar, saffron, nutmeg, black pepper, mace, coriander, or sesame.

There are two basic varieties of advieh:

- Advieh-e polo - used in rice dishes (usually sprinkled over rice after the rice has been cooked)
- Advieh-e khoresh - used in stews or as a rub for grilled or roasted meats

Advieh used for stews often includes saffron, sesame, cinnamon, rose buds, coriander, cardamom, and other spices.

== See also ==
- Baharat
- Khoresh
