= Nasi =

Nasi may refer to:

== Food ==
=== Dishes ===
Nasi is the Indonesian and Malay word for cooked rice which is featured in various Nusantara dishes:

- Nasi goreng, a popular Indonesian fried rice dish
  - Nasi goreng jawa
  - Nasi goreng pattaya
- Nasi ambeng
- Nasi bakar
- Nasi bogana
- Nasi campur
- Nasi dagang
- Nasi ganja
- Nasi gurih
- Nasi jamblang
- Nasi kandar
- Nasi kapau
- Nasi kari
- Nasi kebuli
- Nasi kerabu
- Nasi kucing
- Nasi kuning
- Nasi lemak
- Nasi lemuni
- Nasi lengko
- Nasi liwet
- Nasi mandi
- Nasi minyak
- Nasi padang
- Nasi paprik
- Nasi pecel
- Nasi tempong
- Nasi tim
- Nasi timbel
- Nasi tutug oncom
- Nasi tumpang
- Nasi tumpeng
- Nasi uduk
- Nasi ulam

=== Restaurant ===
- Pelita Nasi Kandar, a Malaysian restaurant chain

== Religion ==
- Nasi (Hebrew title), meaning prince in Biblical Hebrew and president in Modern Hebrew
- Nasi', an Islamic calendar concept mentioned in the Qur'an

== People ==
- Nasi Manu, a New Zealand professional rugby player
- Nasi (singer), a Brazilian singer
- Arnaldo Ferrari Nasi, an Italian sociologist, journalist and political analyst
- Carlo Nasi, an Italian sailor
- Gracia Mendes Nasi, a wealthy Jewish woman in Renaissance Europe and the aunt of Joseph Nasi
- Guglielmo Nasi, an Italian General during World War II
- Joseph Nasi, an Ottoman Court Jew, diplomat and administrator

== Other ==
- nāsī, term for a Dravidian form of gavaksha in Hindu temple architecture
- Palazzo Nasi, Florence, a late medieval Italian palace
- Nasi (Caphyatis), a village in Arcadian Azania in ancient Arcadia, Greece, on the river Tragus
- Nasi (Cleitoria), a village in ancient Arcadia, Greece, on the river Ladon
- Näsijärvi, a Finnish lake that is also called Lake Nasi
- 1534 Näsi, a main belt asteroid
- "nasi-", used in medical Latin for something relating to the nose

== See also ==
- Nashi (disambiguation)
- Nazi (disambiguation)
