= Nazi (disambiguation) =

Nazi or Nazis usually refers to one of these aspects of the movement that controlled Germany in the 1930s and 1940s:

- Nazism (AKA Nationalsozialismus, lit. 'National Socialism', NS), the ideology
- Nazi Germany (AKA Nationalsozialistischer Staat lit. 'National Socialist State', Nationalsozialistisches Deutschland, or the German Reich, Third Reich, or Thousand-Year Reich), the 1933–1945 country
- Nazi Party (AKA Nationalsozialistische Deutsche Arbeiterpartei, NSDAP, lit. 'National Socialist German Workers' Party'), the political organization
- Wehrmacht (lit. 'defence force' (Note: This name was presumably used because they weren't supposed to have an offensive military. See Treaty of Versailles § Military restrictions and German rearmament for more details.)), the unified military

People supporting Nazism:

- List of Nazis
  - List of Nazi Party leaders and officials
- List of Nazi ideologues

Related terms:

- Nazi (epithet) / Nazi (insult)
  - Feminazi, a pejorative term for feminists
  - Grammar Nazi (AKA Grammar Pedant), an informal, pejorative term for someone who is excessively strict about proper grammar

Nazi or Nazis may also refer to:

== People and names ==
- Nazi, a diminutive in German of the name Ignaz, itself derived from the Latin Ignatius
- Nazi, another name for the Sumerian goddess Nanshe (Sumerian: 𒀭𒀏, romanized: ^{d}NANŠE (AB×ḪA))
- Nazi Boni (1909–1969), a politician from Upper Volta (now Burkina Faso)
  - Nazi Boni University (French: Université Nazi Boni), founded as the Polytechnic University of Bobo-Dioulasso, a public college in Houet Province, Burkina Faso
- Nazi-Bugaš, a successor of the c. 1359–1333 BC Kassite king of Karduniaš, Burna-Buriaš II
- Captain Nazi (Baron Albrecht Krieger), a fictional character in American comic books published by Fawcett and DC
- Konstantinos Nazis (born 1993), a Greek singer
- La Nazi, the initial ring name of Mexican professional wrestler Norma Martínez, now known as La Comandante
- Nazi-Maruttash (^{m}Na-zi-Múru-taš), Kassite king of Babylon c. 1307–1282 BC
- Nazí Paikidze (born 1993), a Georgian-American chess player
- Nazi Safavi (born 1967), an Iranian writer

== Places ==
=== Iran ===
- Nazi, Chaharmahal and Bakhtiari or Nāzīābād, a village in Kuhrang County, Chaharmahal and Bakhtiari Province
- Nazi, Markazi or Nāzīyeh, a village in Khomeyn County, Markazi Province

== Other political parties ==
- Nasyonal Aktivite ve Zinde İnkişaf ('National Activity and Vigorous Development'), a 1969–1975 neo-Nazi and Pan-Turkist political party in Turkey abbreviated as NAZİ

== See also ==
- Nasi (disambiguation)
- Nätsi, village in Estonia
- Niazi, one of the largest Pashtun tribes
- Neo-Nazism
- Black Nazi (disambiguation)
- Category:Nazism
