= Spiced rice =

Indian dish

Ghee rice
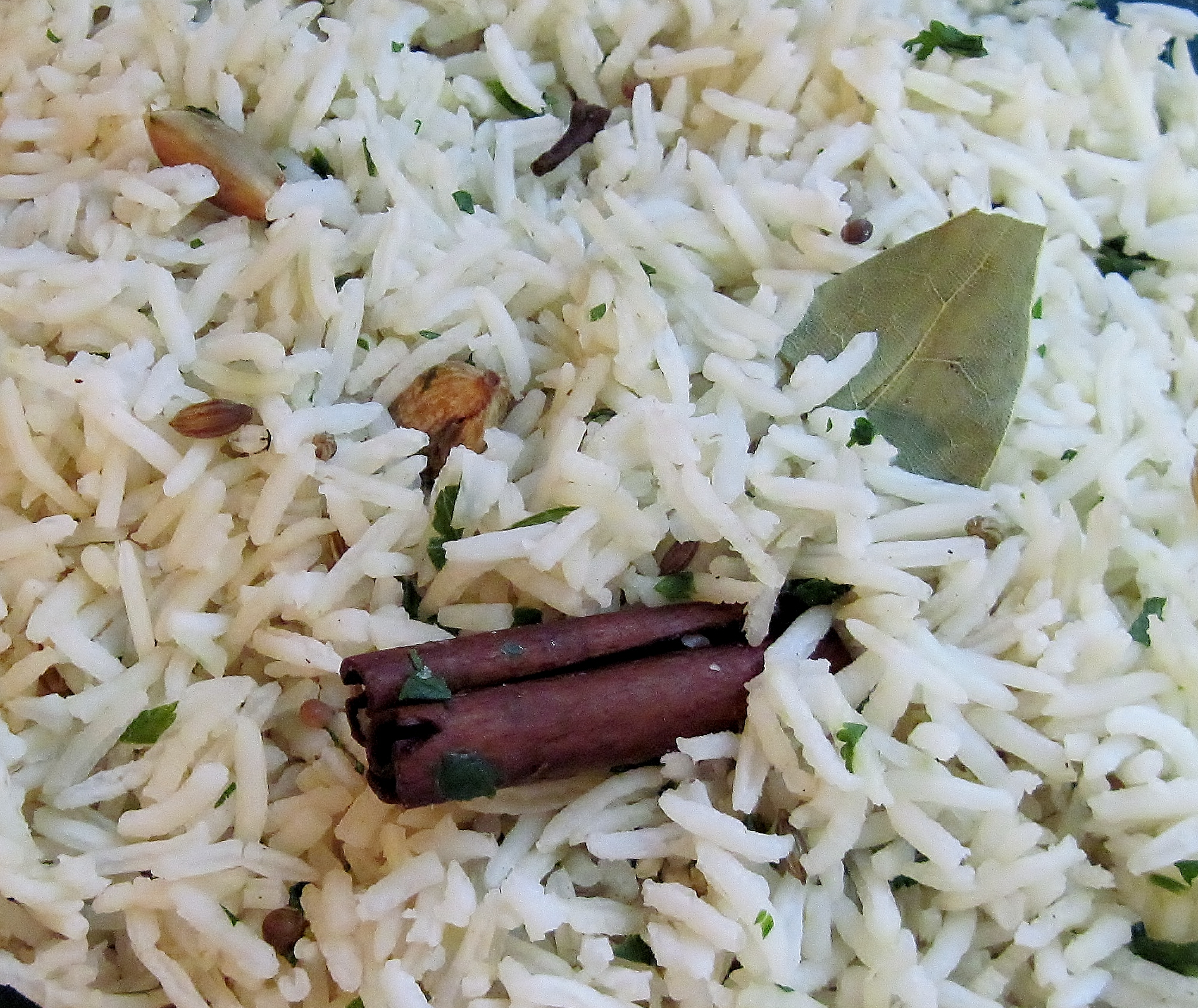
- Alternative names: Neychoru, neyita nuppu
- Course: Main dish
- Place of origin: India
- Region or state: Kerala, Tamilnadu, Karnataka, Andhra Pradesh
- Main ingredients: Rice

Spiced rice is a rice-based dish flavored with various types of spice. Spiced rice is common around the world, with one of the most notable dishes being Indian Ghee rice, which uses ghee as a primary ingredient.

Spiced rice is common among the people of Kerala, especially Malabar region of Kerala, Tulunad region of Karnataka and in Tamil Nadu. It is seen in other parts of India and Asia too in some variation. It is called 'neyita nuppu' in Tulunad region (Udupi-Mangalore) and 'neyichoru' in Tamil and Malayalam.

Ghee rice is usually served along with a rich, meat-based gravy (usually) or is served along with Dalcha.

== Preparation ==
Typically, this is cooked in a one-pot pan or a pressure cooker. Spices like cardamom (elaichi), cinnamon, cloves, bay leaf, and depending on the preparation style and region, cumin seeds (jeera), fennel seeds (saunf), black pepper, and nutmeg strands (javithri) are sauteed in cooking oil or ghee (clarified butter).

Onions, green chillies, mint leaves (pudina), and corriander leaves are added, along with a blended paste of ginger and garlic. Some recipes might also incorporate tomato slices and curry leaves.

After sautéing, water is boiled and rice is added.

Cashew slices are added as garnish; sometimes, they are also sauteed initially along with the rest of the spices.

Rice usually tends to be either Basmati or Jeera Samba, depending on the region.

== Varieties of spiced rice ==
- Pulav or biryani
- Chitranna, lemon rice sautéed with ground nuts, turmeric, oil, mustard seeds and dry chilli.
- Pulihora, tamarind rice sautéed with ground nuts, turmeric, oil, mustard seeds and dry chilli.
- Bisi bele bath, rice sautéed with vegetables and chilli powder.
- Jeera rice, rice sautéed with ghee or oil along with cumin seeds.
- Vagharelo bhaat, aromated rice originally from Gujarat, India.
