= Nazi, Iran =

Nazi (Persian: نازي) may refer to:

- Nazi, Chaharmahal and Bakhtiari
- Nazi, Markazi
