= Nashi =

Nashi may refer to:

== Organisations ==
- Nashi (Canadian charity), opposing human trafficking
- Nashi (Russia), now defunct youth organisation
- Nashi (political movement), led by Alexander Nevzorov
- Nashi (Ukraine), pro-Russian now terminated by court order

== Other uses ==
- Nashi pear, fruit of Pyrus pyrifolia
- Nashi (wind), or N'aschi, a northeastern wind in the Persian Gulf
- Japanese ship Nashi, two Japanese destroyers
- Nakhi people, or Nashi

== See also ==
- Nasi (disambiguation)
- NashiCon, an annual three-day anime convention
