= Nasi tempong =

Indonesian rice dish

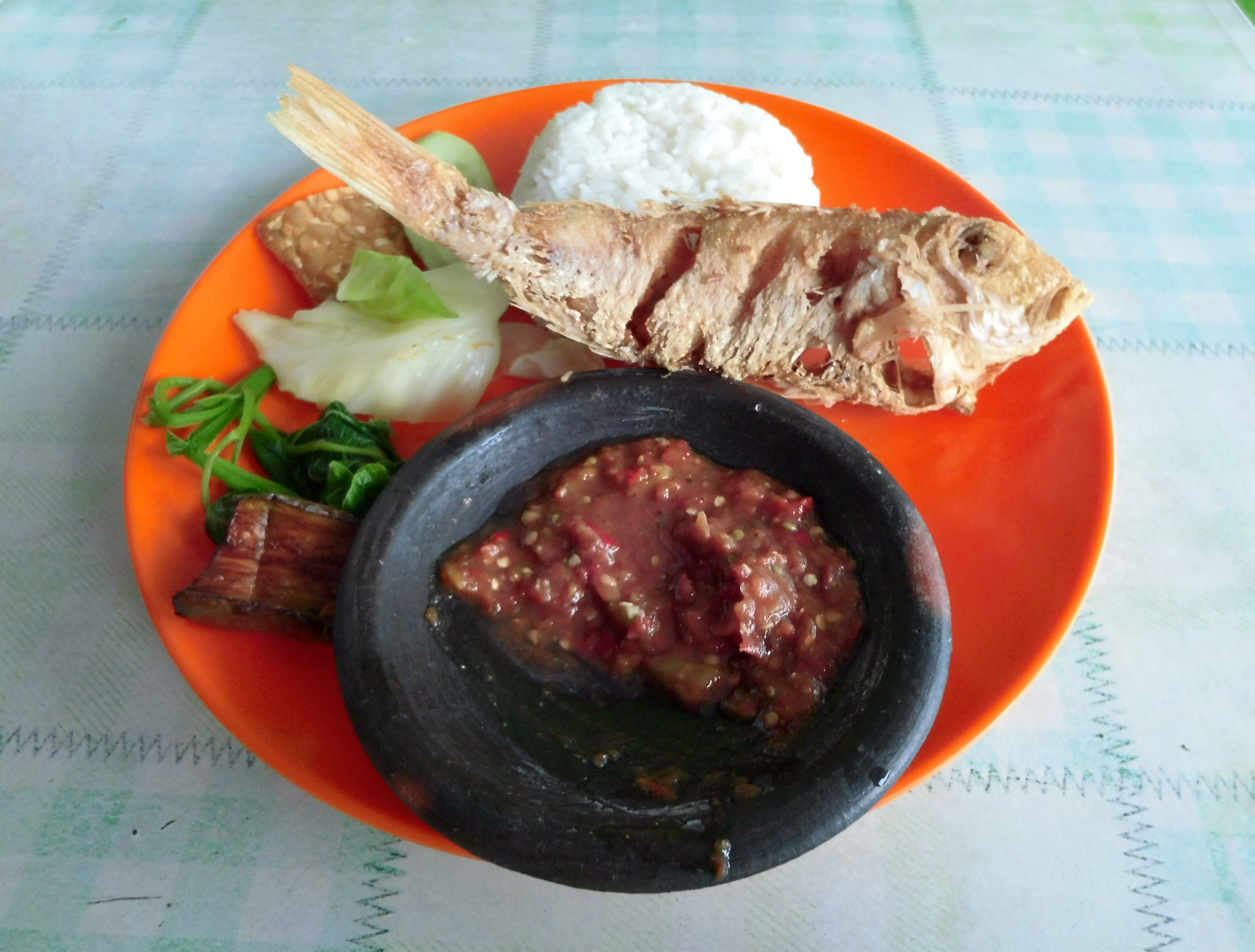
- Alternative names: Sega témpong (Osing)
- Course: Main course
- Place of origin: Indonesia
- Region or state: Banyuwangi, East Java
- Created by: Osing or Javanese
- Serving temperature: hot

Nasi tempong (Javanese: ꦱꦼꦒꦠꦺꦩ꧀ꦥꦺꦴꦁ, romanized: sega témpong; Pegon: سيجا تمبونغ) is an Indonesian rice dish, typical food of Osing people in Banyuwangi, consisting of steamed rice with boiled vegetables (includes boiled spinach, cosmos and basil leaves), tofu, tempeh, corn fritter and fried ariid catfish. This rice dish is served with kencur sambal or terasi sambal.

The "tempong" term is a word in the Osing language which means "to be slapped" in English. Thus the nasi tempong is named because of the spicy taste of nasi tempong which gives a sensation like being slapped.

== See also ==
- Cuisine of Indonesia
- Javanese cuisine
- Nasi ambeng
- Nasi bakar
- Nasi campur
- Nasi gandul
- Nasi goreng
- Nasi pecel
