= Nasi gandul =

Indonesian soup dish

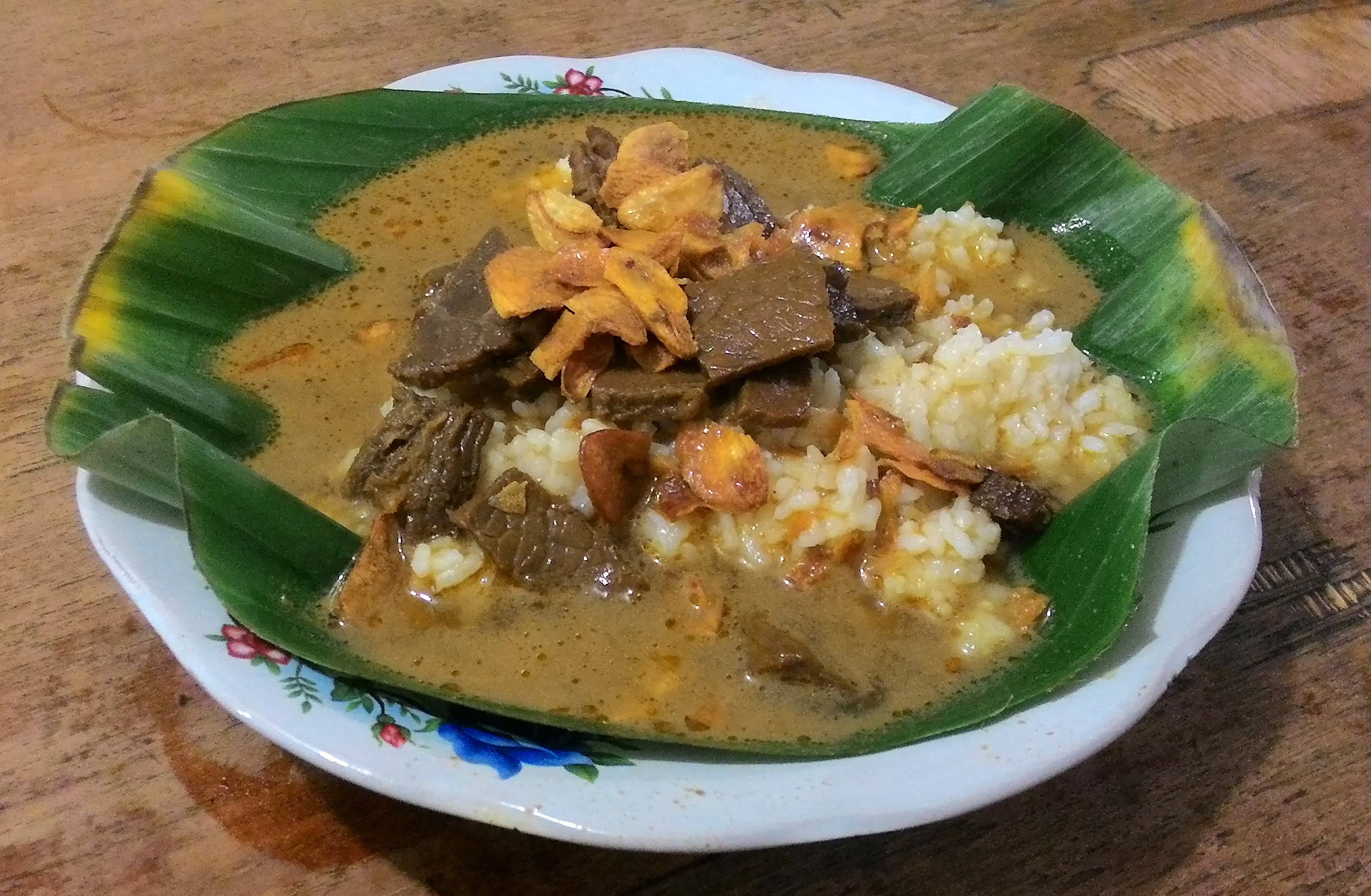
- Alternative names: Sega gandul
- Place of origin: Indonesia
- Region or state: Pati, Central Java

Nasi gandul or in Javanese sega gandhul (Hanacaraka: ꦱꦼꦒꦒꦤ꧀ꦝꦸꦭ꧀) is a rice dish served in rich, sweet, savoury and spicy beef soup, specialty of Pati Regency, Central Java, Indonesia. Nasi gandul consists of steamed rice topped with slices of beef served in spicy soup with savoury flavour in golden-brownish colour. Nasi gandul is somewhat quite similar to other Indonesian dishes; beef semur, tongseng and Javanese gulai.

== Etymology ==
The term gandul in Javanese language means "hanging". The name was derived from the way of travelling vendor selling this food in the past; i.e. by using pikulan or balancing rod; in which the rice and other ingredients are placed "hanging" on the rod. Today however, most of nasi gandul sellers are not mobile and not travelling anymore; most open modest warung eatery instead.

== Ingredients ==
Nasi gandul uses slices of beef, sometimes offals are also included; cooked in spicy and savoury coconut milk-based soup. The spice mixture used in the soup are garlic, shallot, chili pepper, candlenut, ginger, palm sugar, and cinnamon.

The method of serving nasi gandul is quite unique, since the dish is usually served upon banana leaf sheet on a plate. Sprinkle of crispy bawang goreng (fried shallot), or bawang putih goreng (fried garlic), are added on top prior of serving. Traditionally, it is not consumed using spoon, but using suru, which is spoon made from banana leaf.

== See also ==
- Nasi ambeng
- Nasi jinggo
- Nasi liwet
- Nasi pecel
- Nasi tempong
