= Arnaldo Ferrari Nasi =

Italian sociologist and political analyst

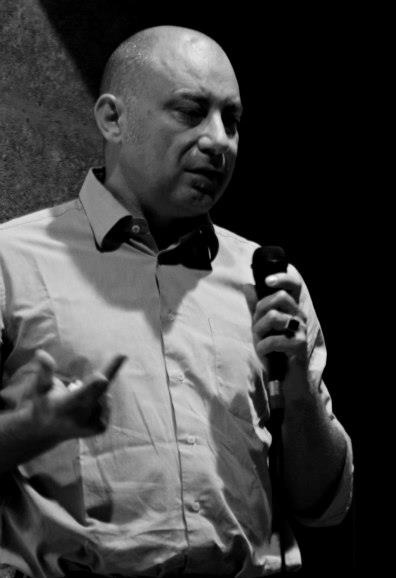
- Tourism Conference, Genoa. September 2012
- Born: July 9, 1965 (age 61); Chiavari, Genoa, Italy
- Education: University of Milan
- Occupations: Market Researcher, Pollster
- Website: http://www.remtene.it http://www.analisipolitica.it

Arnaldo Ferrari Nasi (born July 9, 1965) is an Italian sociologist, political analyst, and journalist.

== Early life and education ==
He grew up in Liguria in Sestri Levante. He graduated from the Faculty of Political Science of the University of Milan and he was later trained at the Institute of Sociology headed by Prof. Guido Martinotti, before moving to the Institute for Public Opinion Studies of Prof. Renato Mannheimer. Therein, Arnaldo became senior researcher coordinating many political studies to institutions such as the Presidency of the Republic, and became editor in chief of the scientific magazine "Political Trends" published by the institute. Deepens, in those years, statistical studies and continuative analysis.

== Career ==
He works and lives in Milan with his family. Advisor for many institutions and public authorities, and as the Presidency of the Council of Ministers, he is known as pollster for his analysis published on national press as Libero, L'Espresso, Il Foglio, and Panorama, or on television as RAI, Mediaset, La7, and Radio 24. As a member of the Italian Society of Political Science, he collaborated as adjunct professor in Public Opinion Analysis for the Faculty of Political Science at Genoa University.

From the middle of the decade, Arnaldo established the eponymous institute of socio-political research. During this time focuses the activities following election campaigns on behalf of individual candidates or political parties. In 2008, he became advisor to the Prime Minister's Office. Since 2009, in account of Unioncamere/Isnart, he created and managed the first national panel of Tourism Operators and in 2011 that of Italian Restaurants Worldwide. In those years, he entered the scientific committee and drafting of "Impresa Turismo" and starts a new line of study. Still in the consulting, related to research methodology and applied statistics, he collaborated with some important firms in the multinational market research, such as TNS Infratest.

Since 2005, he has been in charge of an independent research programme called AnalisiPolitica, which produces results that often gain the attention of the press and national television, which can also be credited thanks to the significant names present, like John Agnew, Corrado Guzzetta, James Newell, Angelo Panebianco, Gianfranco Pasquino and Marcello Veneziani.

In 2014 he became the founding member of Remtene, a company specializing in finding and analyzing unstructured information from digital media, and moved the main activity on the branches of the more established market research. He serves with the rank of Major in the Italian Army Reserve; among its most important tasks, that of analyst for the NATO Rapid Deployable Italian Corps in Solbiate Olona (VA).

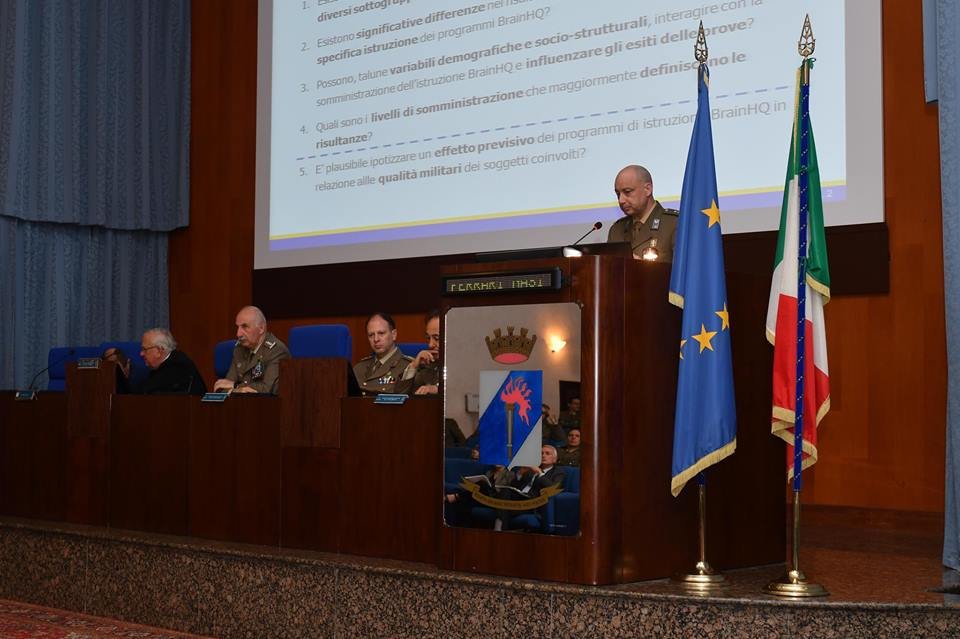
Military Psychology Conference - Rome. May 2017

== Curiosity ==
Arnaldo has a history of professional and semi-professional musician, he has published several discs, he is a founding member and has played a long time in the group The Orobians, relating to Ska jazz wave.

== Publication ==
- Quaderni di Studi Strategici, co-writer.
- Nozioni di alfabetizzazione alla microinformatica (2000).
