= Bakwan =

Indonesian vegetable fritter

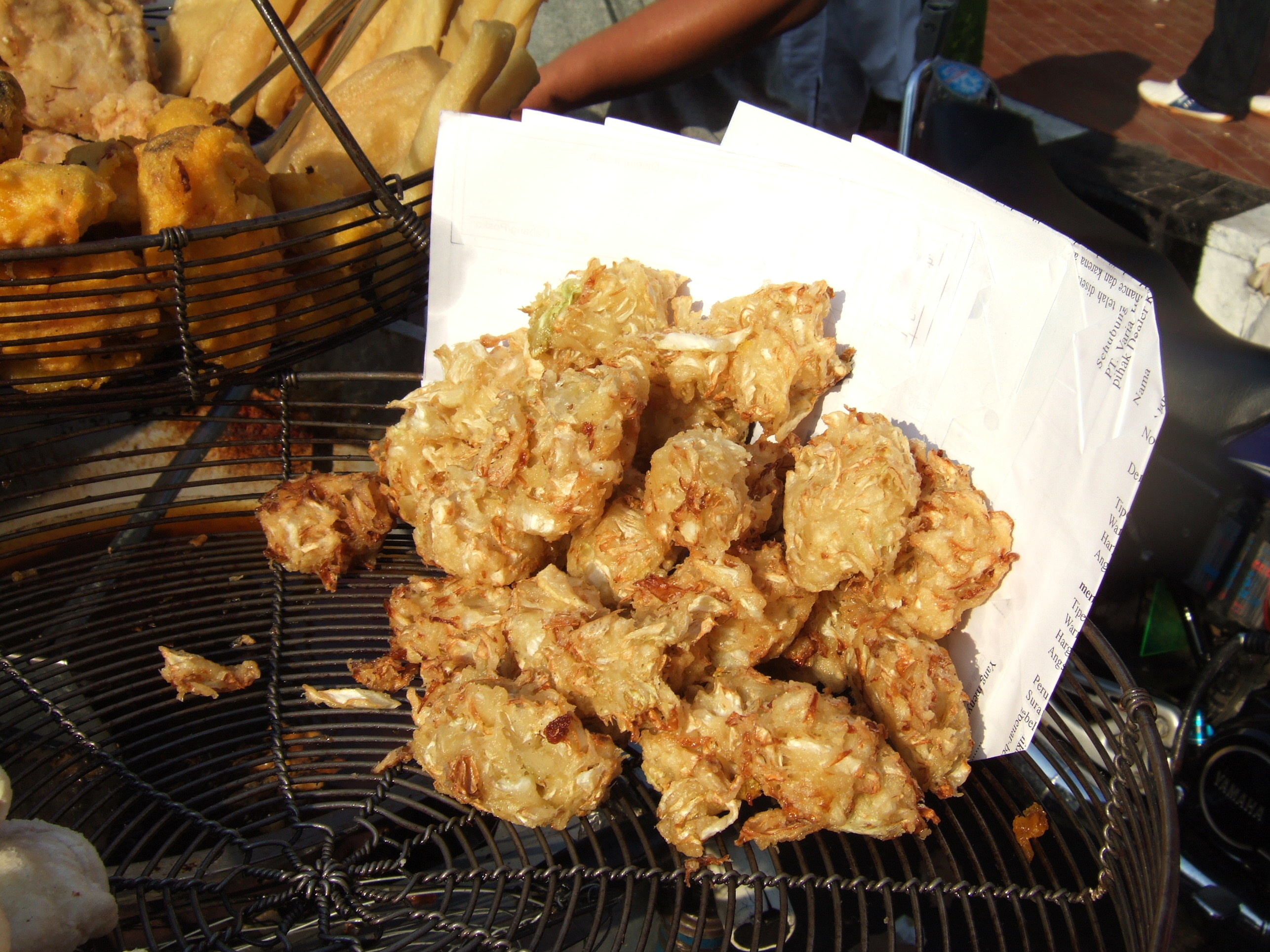
- Bakwan, cabbage fritter snack
- Type: Fritter, gorengan
- Course: Snack
- Place of origin: Indonesia
- Main ingredients: Batter (wheat flour, egg, water), vegetables (shredded cabbage, carrots, bean sprouts, corn, scallions)
- Variations: Shrimp

Bakwan (Chinese: 肉丸; Pe̍h-ōe-jī: bah-oân) are vegetable fritters or gorengan commonly found in Indonesia. Bakwan are usually sold by traveling street vendors. The ingredients are vegetables—usually bean sprouts, shredded cabbage and carrots—battered and deep-fried in cooking oil. To achieve a crispy texture, the batter uses a mixture of flour, corn starch and sago or tapioca. In West Java bakwan is known as bala-bala and in Semarang is called badak. It is similar to Japanese yasai tenpura (vegetable tempura), Korean pajeon, Bruneian cucur, Indian pakora, Burmese a-kyaw, Caribbean pholourie or Filipino ukoy.

== Variations ==
Bakwan usually consists of vegetables; however, another variation called 'bakwan udang' adds whole shrimp to the batter and is sold in snack stands at the marketplace. Because of its similarity, the term 'bakwan' is often interchangeable with 'perkedel'. For example, Indonesian corn fritters are often called either 'perkedel jagung' or 'bakwan jagung'.

In East Java, bakwan refers to fried wonton with filling, served with tofu, noodles and meatballs in a soupy broth. The dough filling is a mixture of ground meat or fish with flour, wrapped in wonton skin and fried. This kind of bakwan is similar to bakso meatball soup, and commonly known as 'bakwan Malang' or 'bakwan Surabaya' in reference to their cities of origin, Malang and Surabaya in East Java.

Originally bakwan comes from a Chinese Indonesian cuisine recipe along with bakpao (meat bun), bakso (meatball), bakmie (meat noodle), and bakpia. The name "bakwan" is derived from the Hokkien language.

== Gallery ==
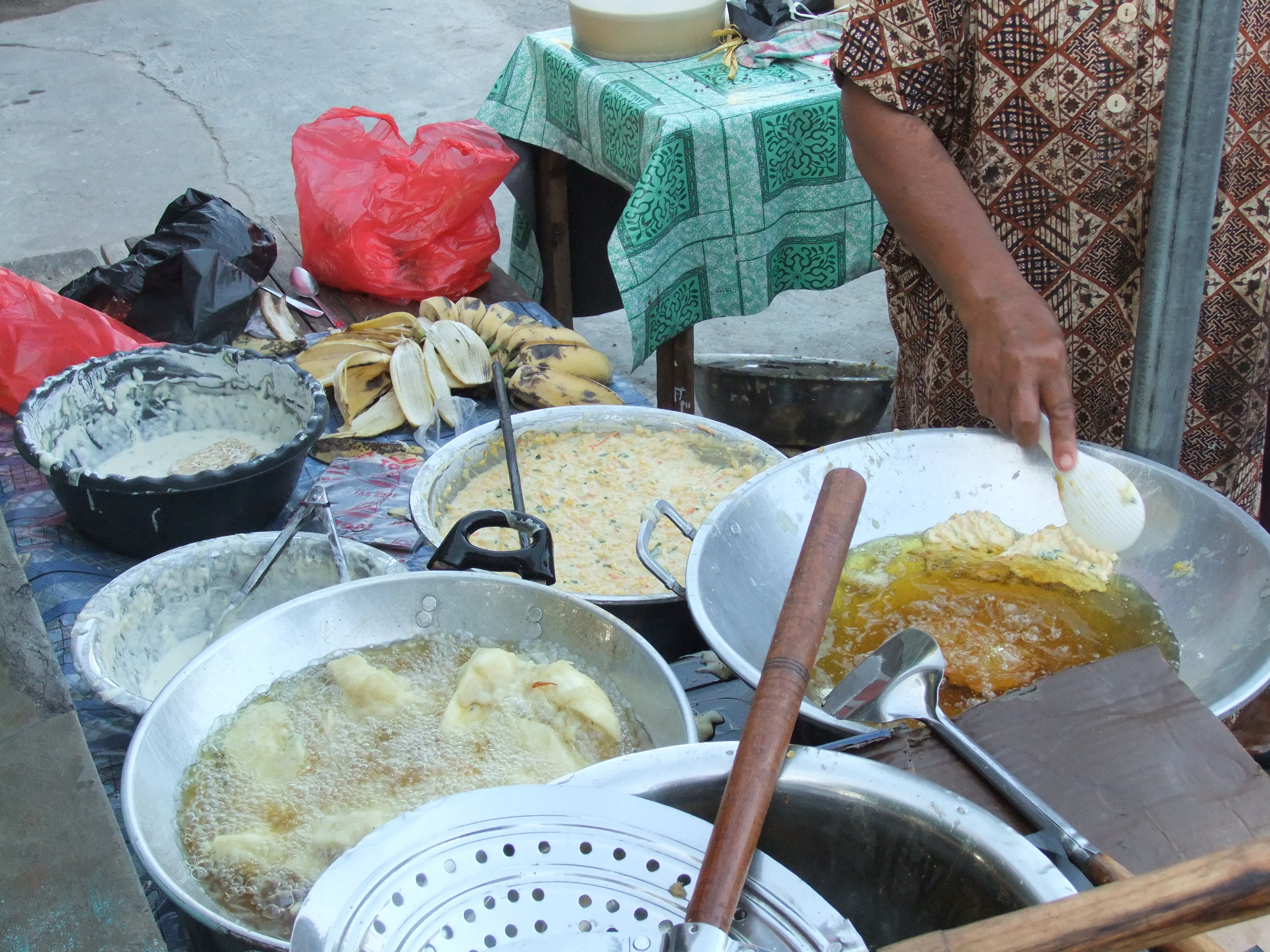
Frying bakwan

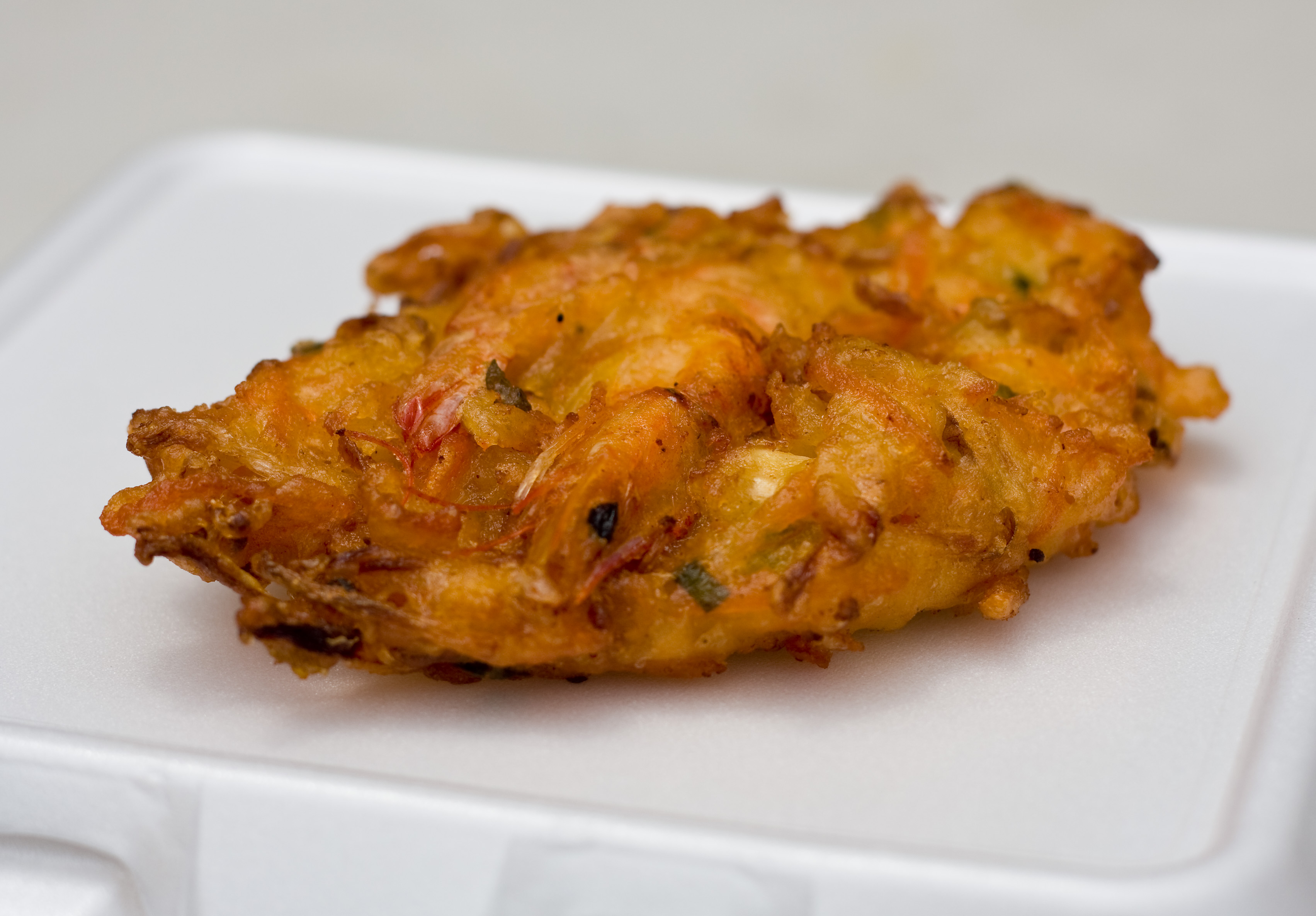
Bakwan udang, seafood cake with whole shrimp

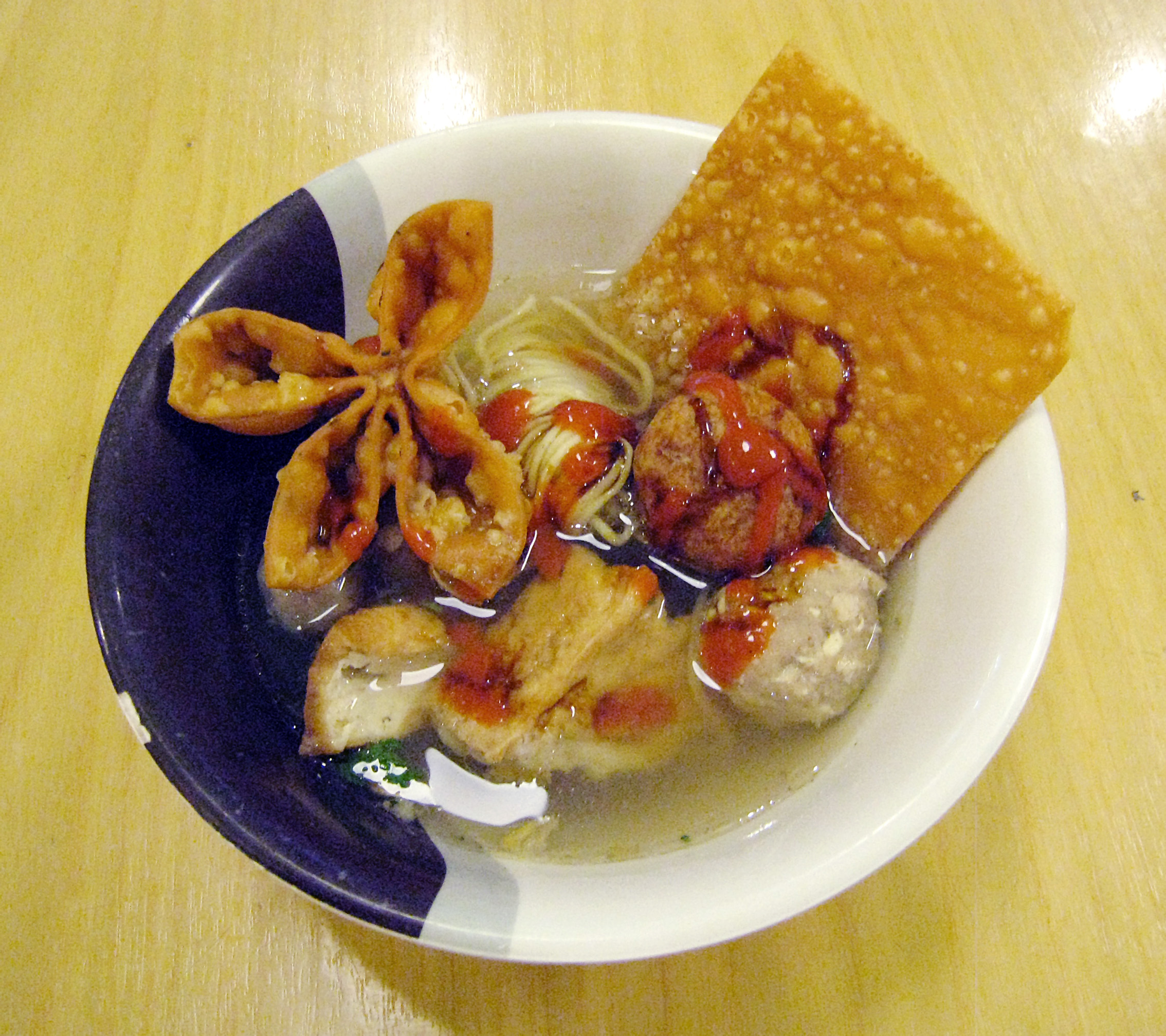
Bakwan Malang, also called Bakso Malang

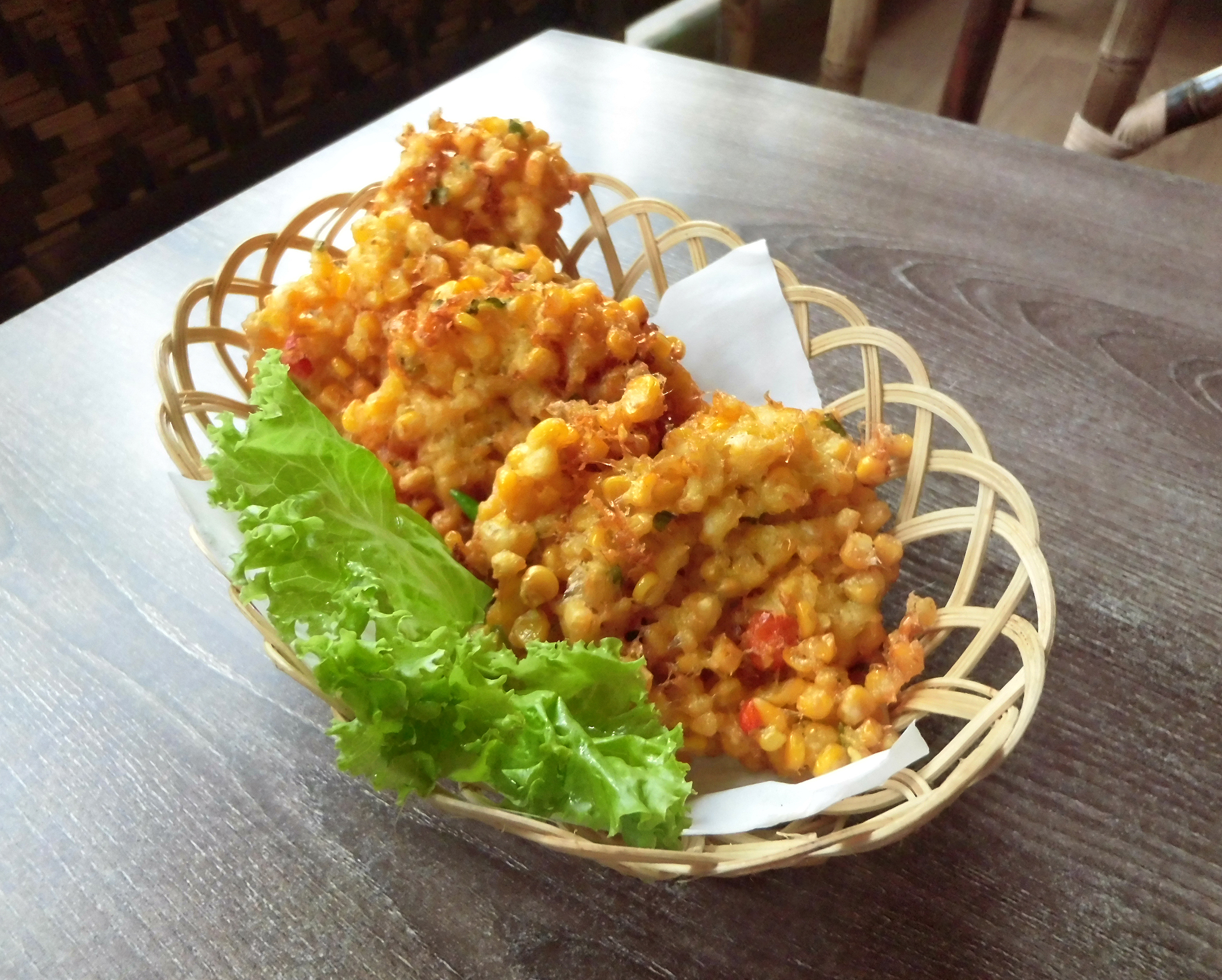
Bakwan jagung, a type of corn fritter

== See also ==
- Perkedel
- Tahu campur
- Indonesian cuisine
- Pakora
