= Nasi kandar =

Malaysian rice dish from Penang

Nasi kandar ناسي كاندر
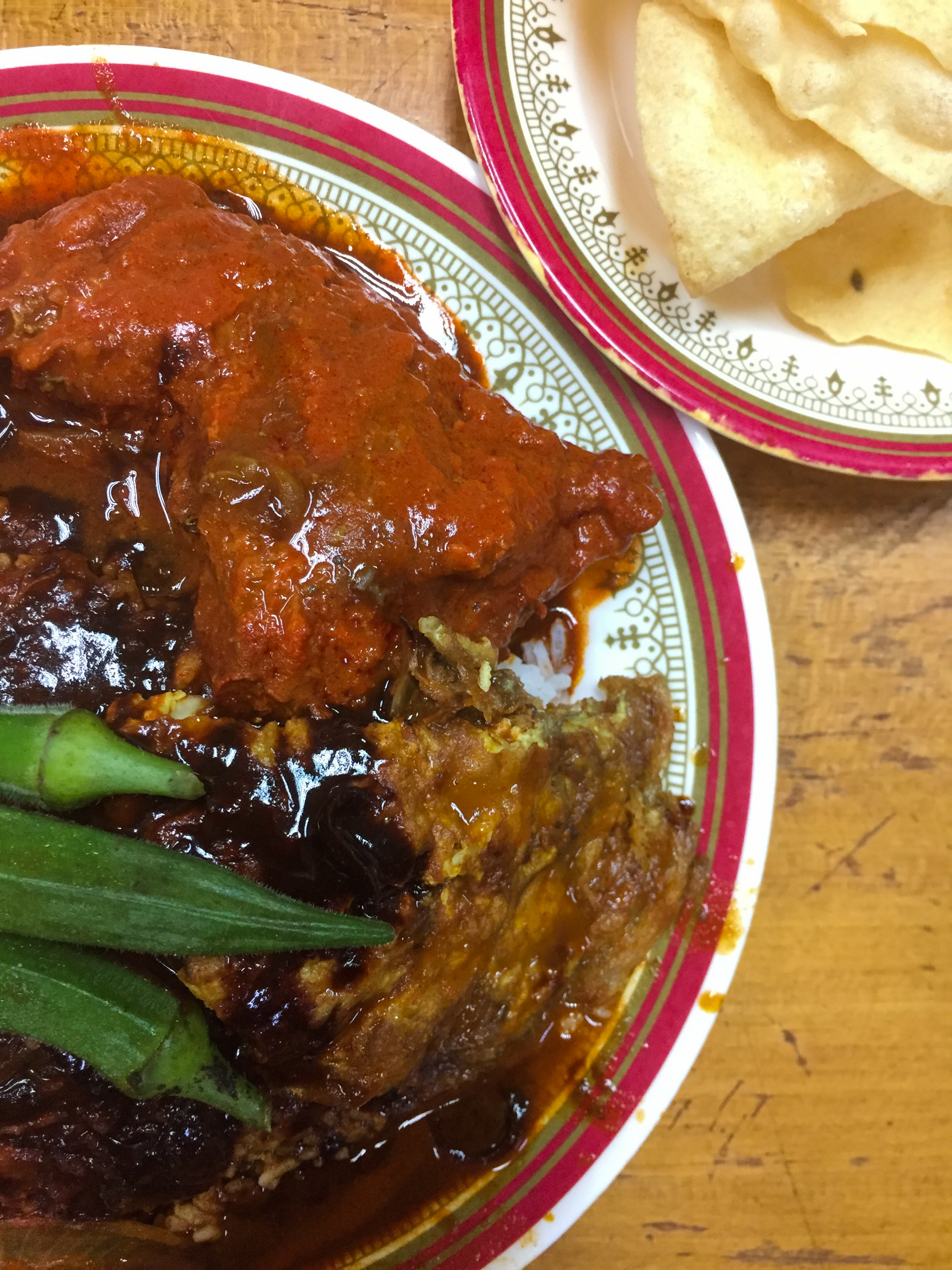
- A classic kuah banjir (flooded mix of different types of curries) rendition of nasi kandar, accompanied with mamak style-sambal chicken, omelette, okra,pappadom and salted duck eggs .
- Type: Dish
- Course: Main course
- Place of origin: Malaysia
- Region or state: Penang
- Created by: Malaysian Indian
- Main ingredients: Rice, meat, vegetables, and curry
- Similar dishes: Nasi ganja, nasi dalca, nasi lemak royale, nasi maduri

Nasi kandar (Kedah Malay: Nasi kandaq; Jawi: ناسي كاندر) is a popular northern Malaysian dish from Penang, originally introduced by Tamil Muslim traders from India. The meal consists of steamed rice combined with an array of distinct curries, side dishes, and gravies. The selection of curries consists of various blends of vegetables, seafood or meat.

Other closely related regional variations of nasi kandar include nasi ganja (Ipoh), nasi dalca (Penang), nasi lemak royale (Alor Setar), nasi maduri (Perlis), nasi kalut (Kedah), and nasi tomato (Penang and Kedah).

In Malaysia and Singapore, nasi kandar is predominantly linked to Muslim-owned establishments that specialise in Indian curry rice, while the terms "banana leaf restaurants" and "curry houses" are typically used to describe establishments operated by non-Muslims.

== Etymology ==
The dish name is potentially a portmanteau, nasi derives from Malay, meaning rice; while kandha' is an Urdu name means shoulder; another possible theory is that the name originated in the Malay verb mengandar - "rest on shoulders". However, both theories are aligned on its common origin - the use of a shoulder pole for transporting the food.

== History ==
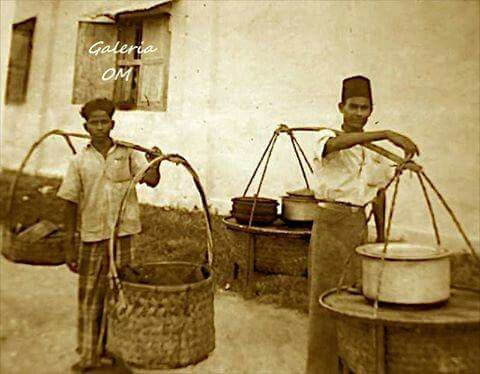
The dish was historically transported via a bamboo/wooden stick on the shoulders - known as mengandar in Malay

Nasi kandar originates from the early 1900s, when itinerant Indian Muslim vendors would sell curry and rice to the dock employees of Weld Quay, located in George Town, Penang.

The earliest form of nasi kandar initially contained fish curry with brinjals or okra, fried curry beef, fried fish and boiled eggs; it used to cost about 5 cents each. The rice hawkers would commonly set up stools at a jetty to sell breakfast to dock workers. By the 1930s, the rice peddlers would also commonly travel from home-to-home. It was also common for the seller to operate on the roadside or beneath a shady tree. They would carry brass pots by a bamboo or a wooden shoulder pole; on one end of the pole there were containers holding curry meals, with plain rice on the other end.

However, by the mid-20th century, the traditional approach of transporting the rice and dishes on the shoulder began to wane, as many sellers moved towards selling nasi kandar in stalls and alleyways. In the 1970s, more vendors invested in the restaurant industry, further departing from the mobile eatery origins of nasi kandar. The menu options have also progressed; a common present-day nasi kandar restaurant will sell up to dozens of distinct curries, gravy and side dishes.

Hameediyah is recognized as Penang's oldest nasi kandar restaurant, having originally started under a tree at a field in Lebuh Campbell, Penang in 1907.

== Description ==
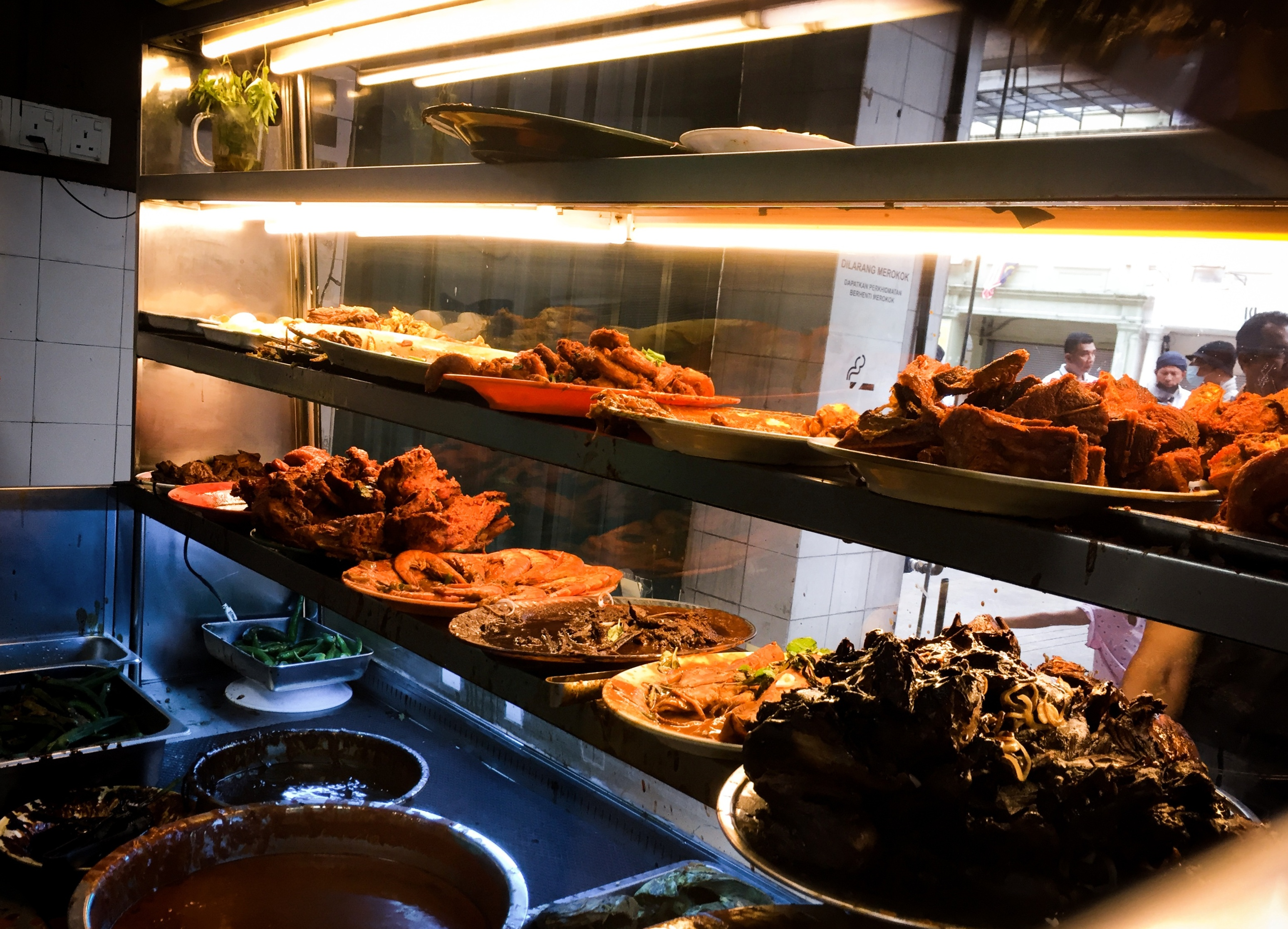
An array of curries, sides and gravies commonly paired on a plate of nasi kandar being displayed in a local restaurant

The rice for a nasi kandar dish is often placed in a wooden container about three feet high, giving it a distinctive aroma. The rice is accompanied by lauk-pauk (side dishes) such as ayam goreng, assortment of kari (curry) like kari daging (beef), kari limpa (beef spleen) and kari kambing (mutton); telur ikan, udang goreng or sotong goreng. The vegetable dish would usually be terung (brinjals), bendi (okra) or peria (bitter gourd). A mixture of curry gravies is poured on the rice. This is called banjir ("flooded") and imparts a diverse taste to the rice.

Traditionally, nasi kandar is always served with its side dishes on a single plate. Nowadays, small melamine bowls are used for the side dishes. Nevertheless, the gravy mix is always poured on top of the rice directly.

In recent years, several chain restaurants have appeared such as Nasi Kandar Shaaz, Nasi Kandar Subaidah, Nasi Kandar Nasmir, Pelita Nasi Kandar, Nasi Kandar Astana, Q-Bistro Nasi Kandar and Kayu Nasi Kandar. Purists have disputed its taste compared to the original Penang versions.

== Variations ==
There are a few related forms of the meal with some divergence on the type of rice, side dishes and recipes; albeit all commonly shared curry-based condiments to complete the meal:

- Nasi dalca - Plain white rice or the ghee-based nasi minyak, commonly paired with kuah dalca (Dalcha-style gravy) and an assortment of curries. Sprinkles of bawang goreng is usually added on top of the meal.
- Nasi ganja - Yellow coloured rice with herbs, though in fact no "ganja" (cannabis) is actually used in its preparation. Commonly associated with Ipoh, and to some extent, Perlis.
- Nasi lemak Alor Setar/Nasi lemak Royale - Slightly different from white basmati-based rice commonly seen in nasi kandar, the nasi lemak Royale is yellow in colour, some vendors may even added glutinous rice on the recipe. The curry mixture is sometimes being slightly sweet compared to the traditional nasi kandar. Popular in Alor Setar, Kedah.
- Nasi maduri - Yellow in colour, and commonly eaten with dalca, meat and chicken curry. Usually found in the state of Perlis.
- Nasi tomato - Tomato-flavored rice, typically prepared with a mix of spices and tomato puree. In contrast to the Malay version, which is often accompanied by ayam masak merah or ayam sambal; the Indian-Muslim variant of nasi tomato is commonly paired with a variety of curries. This version is popular in Penang and to some extent, Kedah.
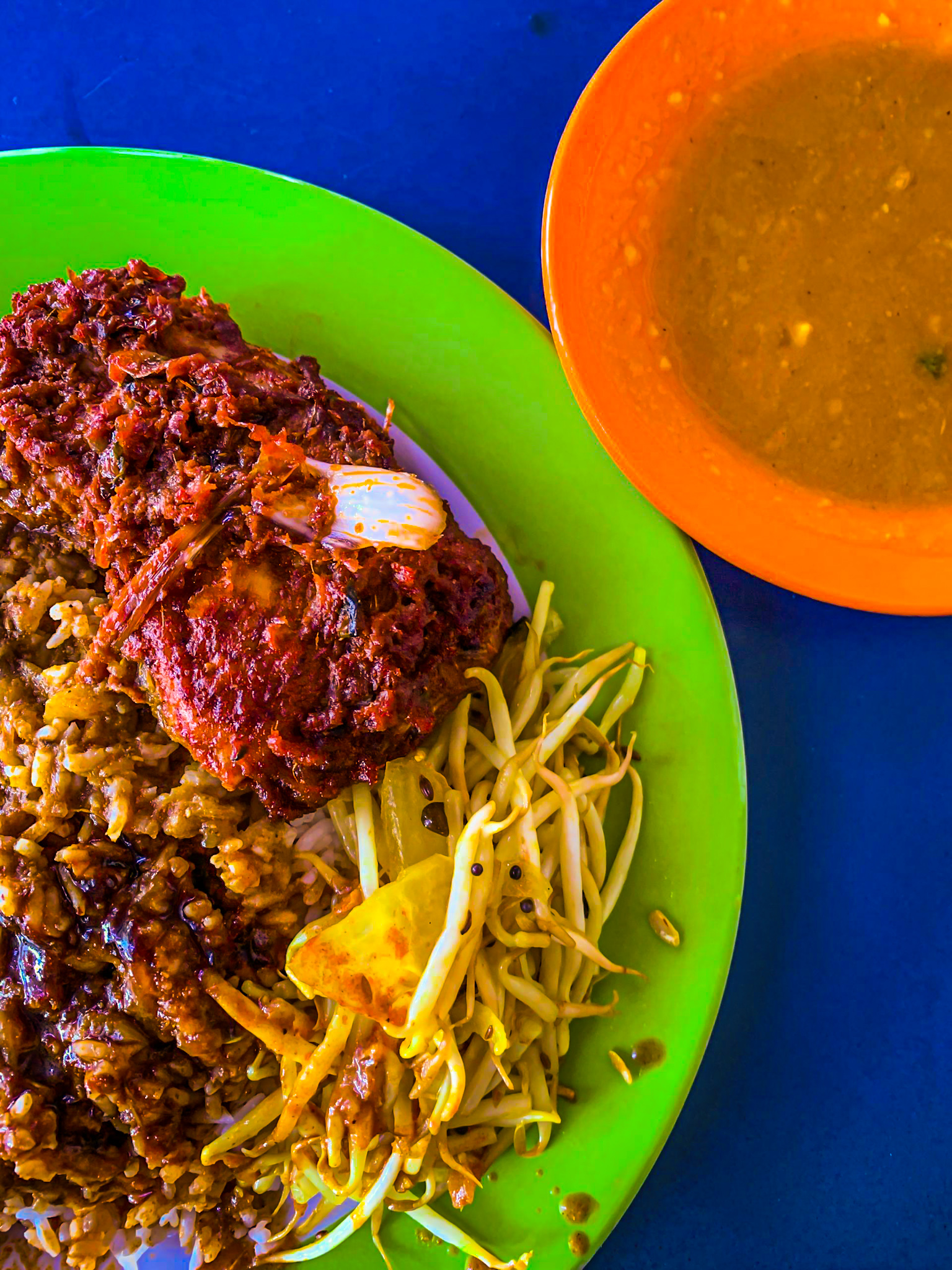
Nasi dalca, a varian of nasi kandar commonly served with kuah dalcha

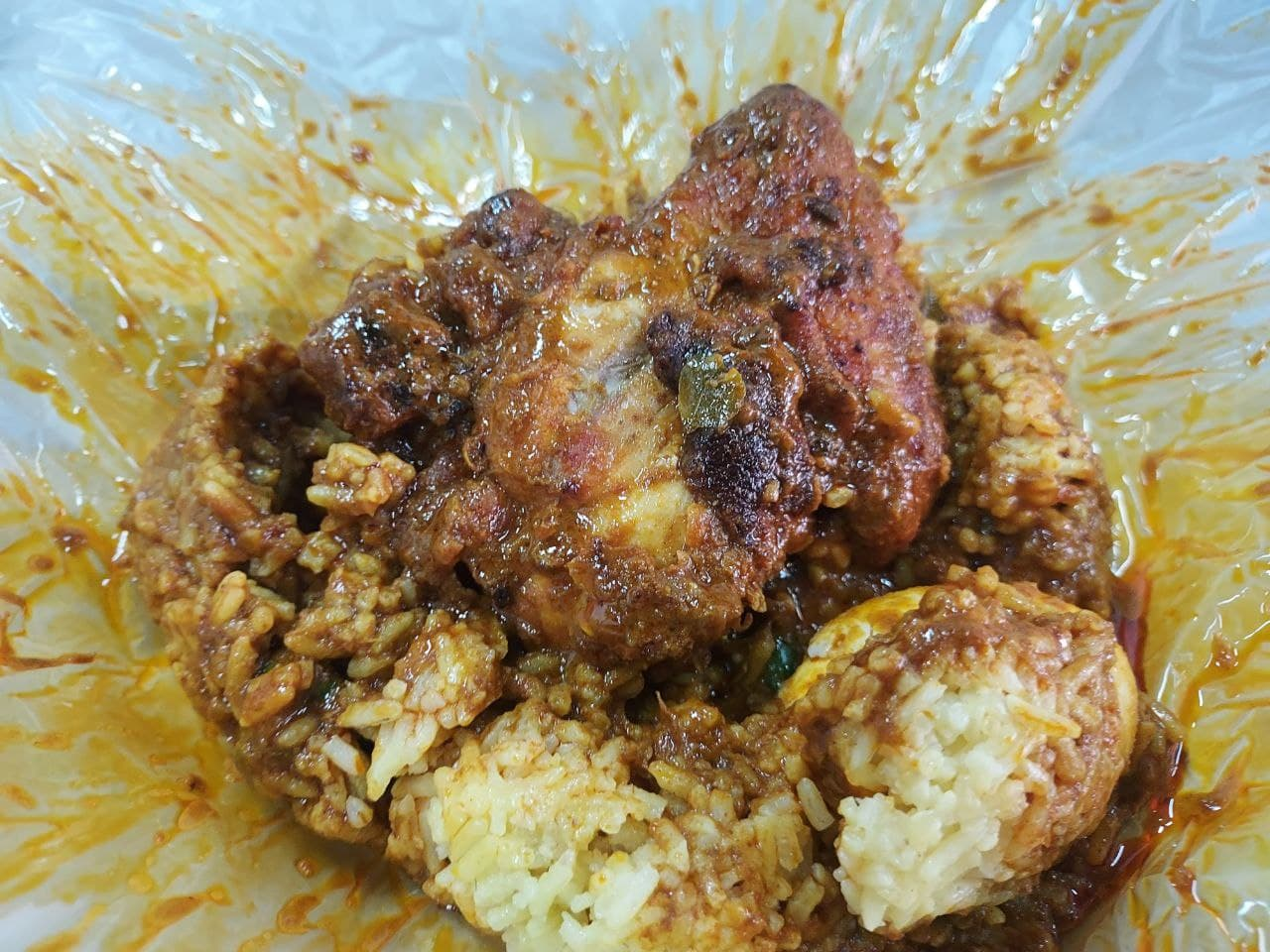
Nasi ganja, a variation of nasi kandar

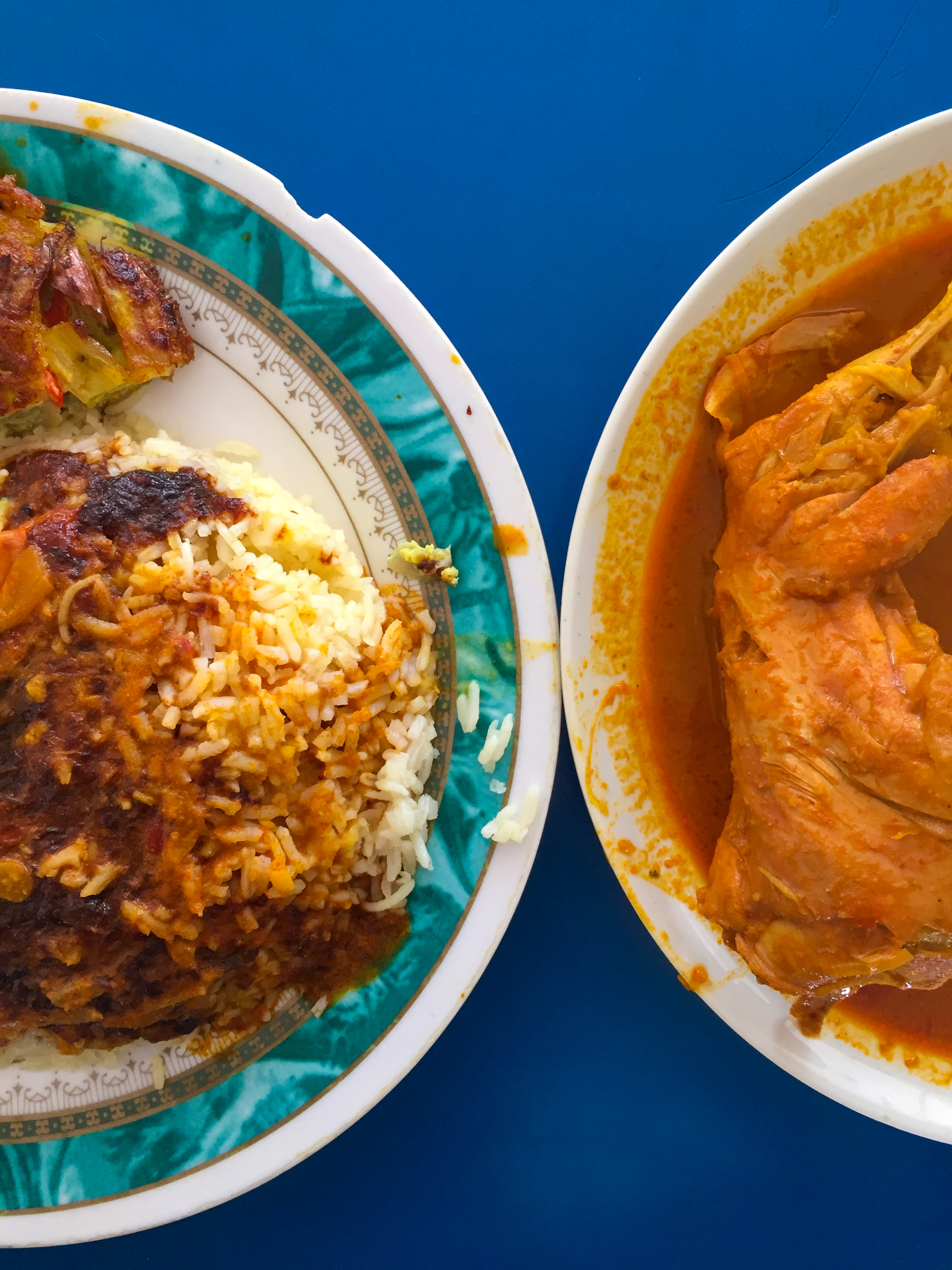
An Alor Setar-style nasi lemak

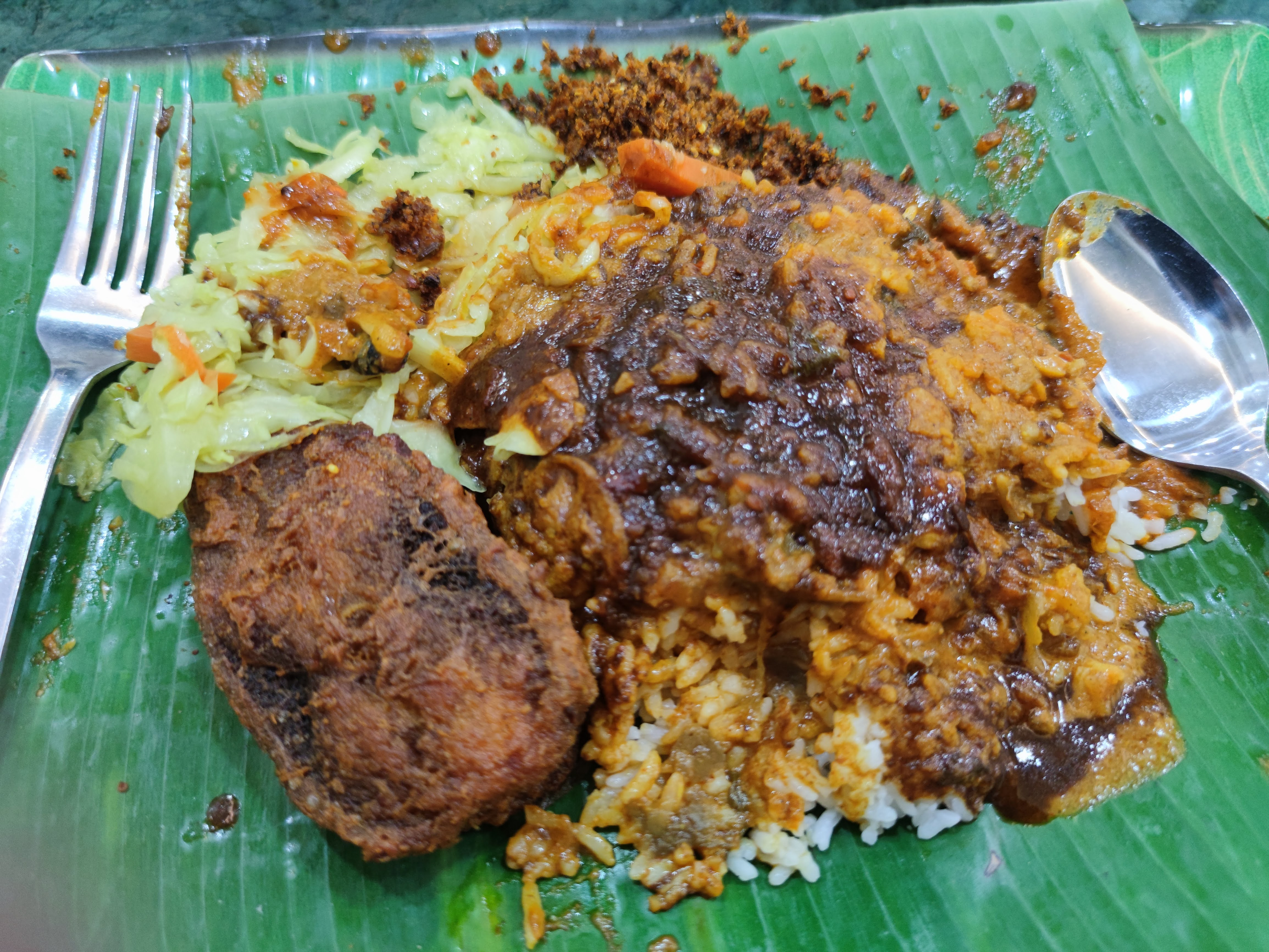
Nasi kandar with fried fish and vegetables

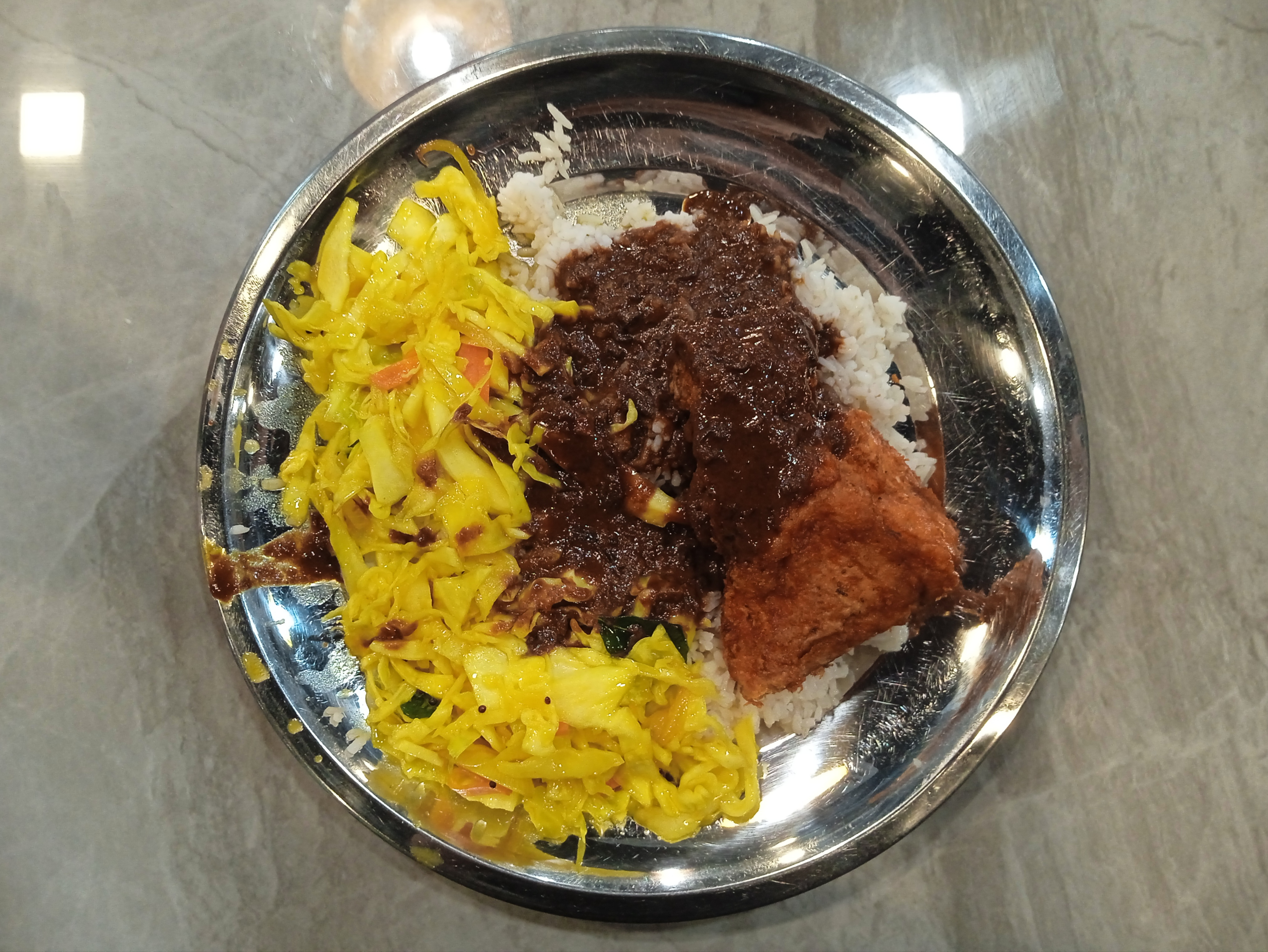
Nasi kandar with fried chicken and vegetables

== See also ==
- Mamak stall
- Banana leaf rice
