= The Orobians =

- Origin: Bergamo, Italy
- Genres: Ska, Rocksteady, Reggae
- Years active: 1997–present
- Labels: Gridalo Forte Records; Mad Butcher Records; Maninalto! Records
- Website: www.theorobians.com

The Orobians are an Italian ska band founded in 1997 in Bergamo and still based there. They play ska and rocksteady standards (mostly instrumental) with a modern jazz twist.

The name comes from the Orobian Alps, a mountain range located between the provinces of Bergamo and Sondrio.

== History ==
From their start in 1997 the band modeled themselves on The Skatalites.

They released their first album in November 2000 and in December 2000 they reached number one in the Popolare Network chart, the most important independent radio chart in Italy.

They perform regularly in Italy, France and Eastern Europe and have opened for The Trojans, The Skatalites and Manu Chao.

Their recordings have been used as theme tunes for programs on both Rai 2 and Rai 3.

In 2001 they became a nonprofit cultural association whose aim is to spread Jamaican music.

== Personnel ==
The line-up has varied over the years but is usually nine members playing five brass instruments, piano, guitar, contrabass and drums. There is sometimes a singer.

Roberto Ambrosioni – Keyboards
Stefano Bosio – Trumpet
Riccardo Capelli – Baritone Sax
Rudy Corbetta – Guitar
Gabriele Cortinovis – Bass
Giuseppe Generoso – Alto Sax
Stefano "Bunny" Marciali – Drums
Erik Peverelli – Tenor Sax
Ugo Crescini – Vocals

=== Former members ===
- On "Introducing the Orobians’ Jamaican Tunes" (2000):

Riccardo Capelli, “Tubo di stufa” – Baritone Sax
Tommaso Chiarolini - Double bass
Mirko Decaro – Piano/Organ
Arnaldo Ferrari Nasi, "Il Conte" – Guitar
Roberto Giussani - Trombone
Matteo Lucarelli – Trumpet
Stefano Marciali, "Bunny" – Drums
Erik Peverelli – Tenor Sax
Tiziano Rossi - Euphomium

- On "9 Ska mads plus 1" (2002):

Riccardo Capelli, “Tubo di stufa” – Baritone Sax
Tommaso Chiarolini - Double bass
Ugo Crescini - Vocals
Arnaldo Ferrari Nasi, "Il Conte" – Guitar
Roberto Giussani - Trombone
Matteo Lucarelli – Trumpet
Stefano Marciali, "Bunny" – Drums
Erik Peverelli – Tenor Sax
Ennio Ravasio, "Jubba" – Organ/Piano
Tiziano Rossi - Euphomium

- On "Jamaica-Italia Connection" (2004):

Riccardo Capelli, “Tubo di stufa” – Baritone Sax
Simone Cavalli – Guitar
Ugo Crescini - Vocals
Roberto Giussani - Trombone
Matteo Lorito - Double bass
Matteo Lucarelli – Trumpet
Stefano Marciali, "Bunny" – Drums
Erik Peverelli – Tenor Sax
Ennio Ravasio, "Jubba" – Organ/Piano
Tiziano Rossi - Euphomium

- On "Come and party with the Orobians’ Anniversary Album" (2008):

Stefano Bosio – Trumpet
Riccardo Capelli, “Tubo di stufa” – Baritone Sax
Simone Cavalli – Guitar
Arnaldo Ferrari Nasi, "Il Conte" - Bass
Stefano Marciali, "Bunny" – Drums
Fabio Paganoni - Alto Sax
Erik Peverelli – Tenor Sax
Ennio Ravasio, "Jubba" – Organ/Piano
Tiziano Rossi - Euphomium
Luca Vezzoli - Vocals

- On "Slave to the riddim" (2011):

Roberto Ambrosioni – Keyboards
Stefano Bosio – Trumpet
Riccardo Capelli, “Tubo di stufa” – Baritone Sax
Simone Chiarolini – Guitar
Gabriele Cortinovis - Bass
Arnaldo Ferrari Nasi, "Il Conte" - Guitar
Giuseppe Generoso - Alto Sax
Stefano Marciali, "Bunny" – Drums
Erik Peverelli – Tenor Sax
Luca Vezzoli - Vocals

== Discography ==
- Introducing the Orobians’ Jamaican Tunes (Gridalo Forte Records, 2000)

1. Tema principale da "Indagine su un cittadino al di sopra di ogni sospetto" [Ennio Morricone]
2. Theme from "From Russia With Love" [Lionel Bart]
3. Sentenza [Kontea]
4. The Mooche [Ellington-Mills]
5. Love Theme from "The Godfather" [Nino Rota]
6. Lillah [Khaled]
7. Also Spracht Zarathustra [Richard Strauss]
8. Prelude n°4 [Frederic Chopin]
9. Chez Tante Elise [Legrand]
10. Summertime [Gershwin&Gershwin]
11. Christine Keeler [Tuker-Dorough]
12. The Chicken (La Poia) [Ellis]
13. Guaglione [Nisa-Fanciulli]

- 9 Ska mads plus 1 (Gridalo Forte Records, 2002)

1. Napoleon solo [Taitt]
2. Pugni chiusi [Beretta/Gianco]
3. Money can't buy life [Campbell]
4. Ciao amore ciao [Tenco]
5. South China Sea [Skatalites]
6. Montefiori Skank (Lazy busy) [Montefiori]

- Jamaica - Italia Connection (Gridalo Forte, 2004)

1. Locomotivaintro [the Orobians]
2. Bop Train (Bebop) [Dizzy Gillespie]
3. Old Rocking Chair [Jakie Opel]
4. Exotica [Richards]
5. Under My Thumb [Jagger/Richards]
6. I Remember Treviglio [The Orobians]
7. This is the Day [Matt Johnson]
8. They Call Me Mr. Tibbs [Quincy Jones]
9. Comes Love [Brown/Stept/Tobias]
10. J'irai Cracher sur vos Tombes [Alain Goraguer]
11. A mi Manera [Marcelino Guerra]
12. Somethings are better left unsaid [W.Weeks]
13. La Ragazza con la Pistola [Nino Rota]
14. Bike Baba [The Orobians]
15. Li Vidi Tornare [Luigi Tenco]

- Orobians' Anniversary Album (Mad Butcher Records, 2008)

1. Also Spracht Zarathustra [Richard Strauss]
2. Money can't buy life [Campbell]
3. Lazy busy (Montefiori Skank) [Montefiori]
4. This is the Day [Matt Johnson]
5. Napoleon solo [Taitt]
6. Somethings are better left unsaid [W.Weeks]
7. Bike Baba [The Orobians]
8. Christine Keeler [Tuker-Dorough]
9. Tema principale da "Indagine su un cittadino al di sopra di ogni sospetto" [Ennio Morricone]
10. Bop Train (Bebop) [Dizzy Gillespie]
11. A mi Manera [Marcelino Guerra ]
12. Love Theme from "The Godfather" [Nino Rota]
13. Pugni chiusi [Beretta/Gianco]
14. Chez Tante Elise [Legrand]
15. J'irai Cracher sur vos Tombes [Alain Goraguer]
16. Old Rocking Chair [Jakie Opel]
17. I Remember Treviglio [The Orobians]
18. Li Vidi Tornare [Luigi Tenco]
19.Guaglione [Nisa-Fanciulli]
20. Prelude n°4 [Frederic Chopin]

- Slave to The Riddim (Maninalto! Record, 2011)

Sweet dreams (are made of this) [Lennox/Stewart]
Johnny come home [Gift/Steele]
Kiss [Prince]
Smalltown boy [Somerville/Bronski/Steinbachek]
Whose side are you on? [Reilly]
Who can it be now? [Hay]
Centro di gravità permanente [Battiato]
Don't go [Moyet/Clarke]
Thriller [Temperton]
Close to me [Smith]
Di black petty booshwah [Johnson]
