= Corn fritter =

Fried cakes of maize dough

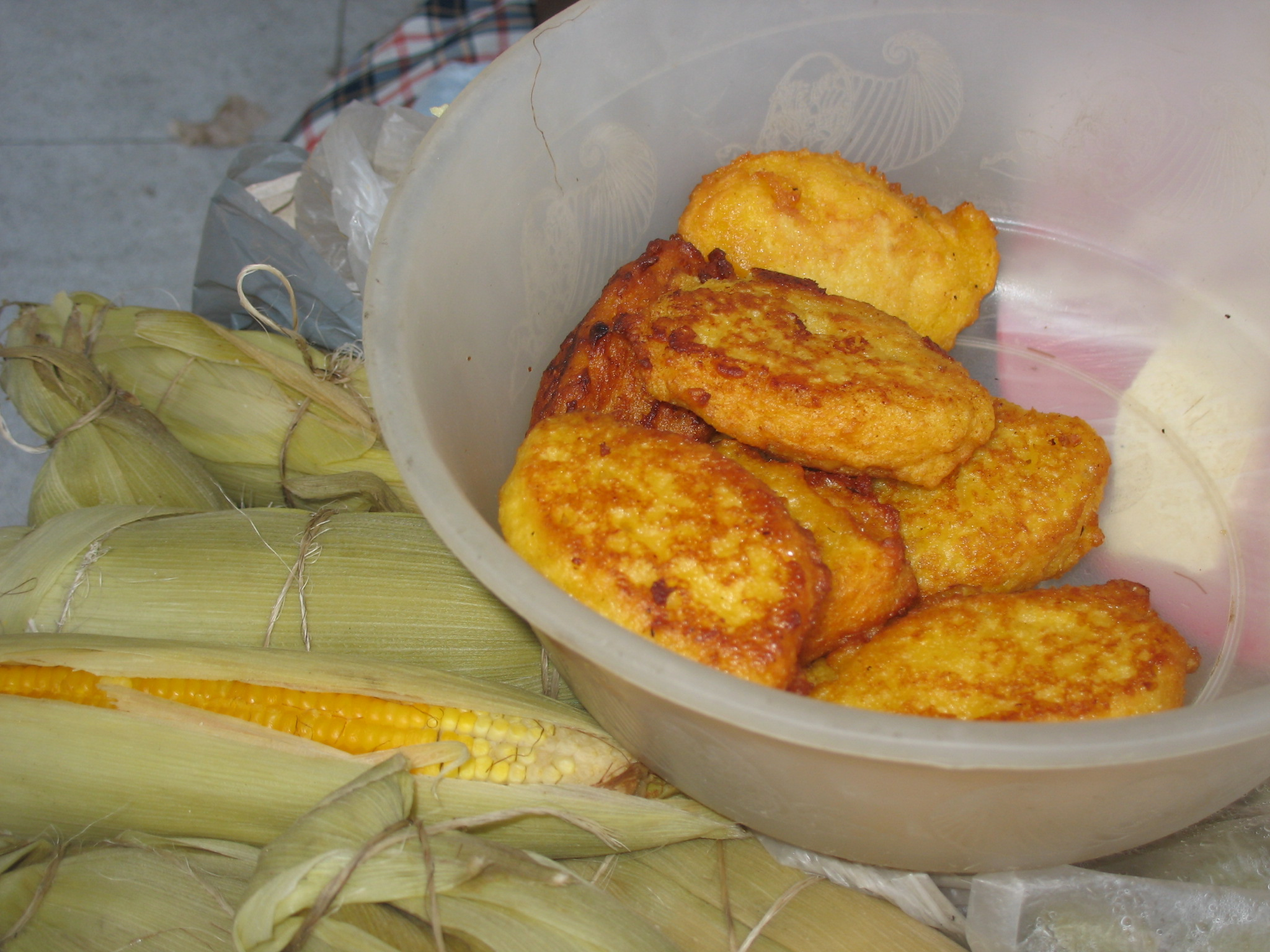
- Bowl of corn fritters
- Type: Fritters
- Course: Snack
- Place of origin: Native American cuisine
- Region or state: Americas, China, Southeast Asia
- Created by: Native Americans in the United States
- Main ingredients: Corn, egg, flour, milk and butter

Corn fritters are fried cakes of a dough or batter made of, or containing, a featured quantity of corn kernels. Originating in Native American cuisine, they are a traditional sweet and savory snack in the Americas, the Southern United States, as well as Indonesia where they are known as perkedel jagung or bakwan jagung.

== History ==
Native Americans had been using ground corn (maize) as food for thousands of years before European explorers arrived in the New World. Corn-based products, such as corn flatbread, arepa and cornbread were staple foods in Pre-Columbian Americas. Native Americans did not use deep frying techniques, however, which require ample supplies of cooking oil as well as equipment in which the oil can be heated to high temperatures.

European settlers learned recipes and processes for corn dishes from Native Americans, and soon devised their own cornmeal-based recipe variations of European breads made from grains available on that continent. The corn fritter probably was invented in the Southern United States, whose traditional cuisine contains a lot of deep fried foods.

On the other side of the world, maize seeds from the Americas were introduced into Southeast Asia in the late 16th century through Spanish and Portuguese traders. The plant thrived in the tropical climate of Indonesia, and soon became a staple food plant in drier areas of central and southeastern Indonesia, since it requires much less water than wet rice. Coconut and palm oil have been essential elements of Indonesian cuisine for centuries. The deep fried technique using palm oil was probably borrowed from Portuguese colonists; and Indonesia and Myanmar (Burma) both have their own types of corn fritter, respectively called perkedel jagung or bakwan jagung and pyaungbu kyaw.

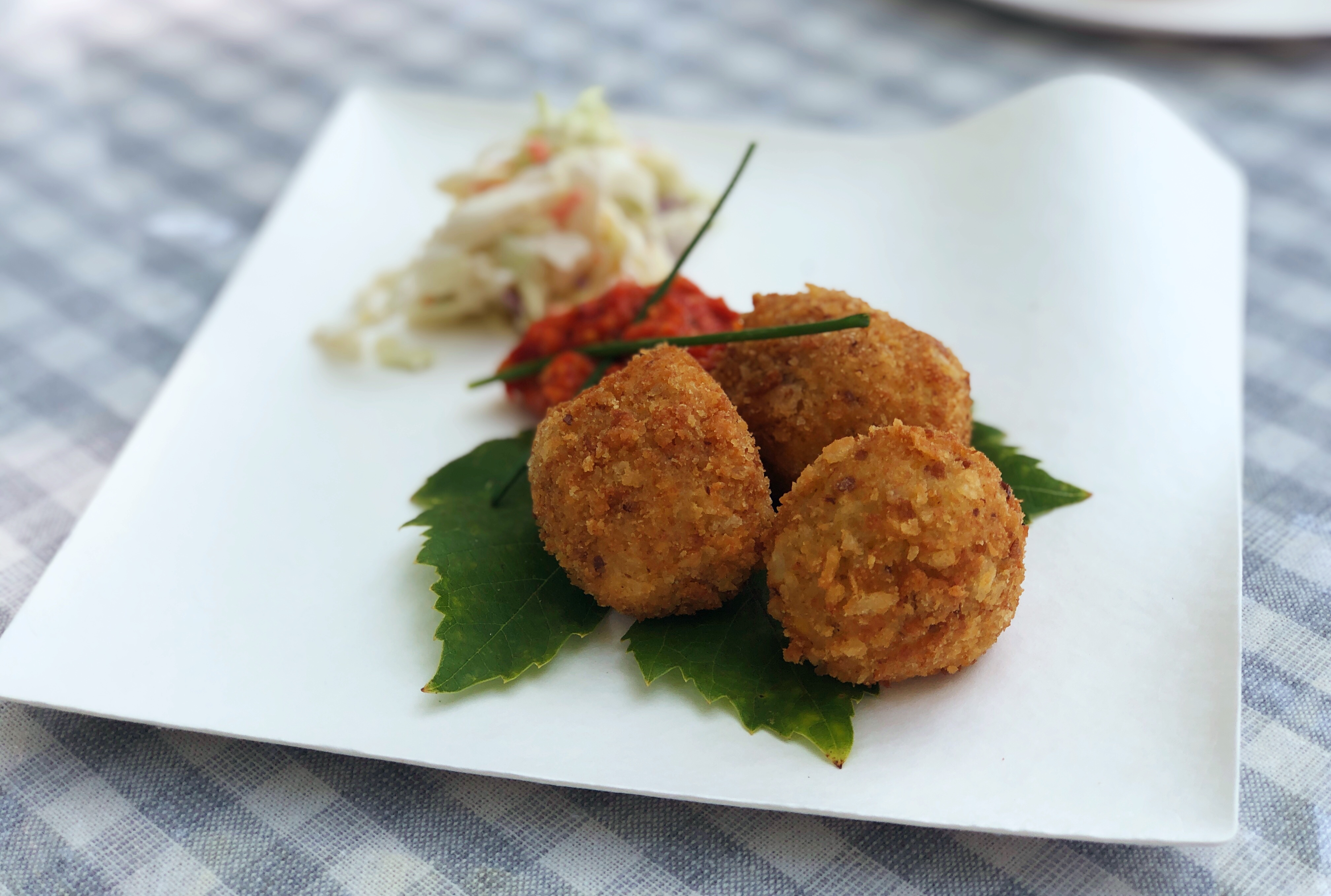
Corn fritters at an event in Sonoma, California

== Regional variations ==
=== Southern United States ===
Traditional corn fritters in the American South use corn kernels, egg, flour, milk, and melted butter. They can be deep fried, shallow fried, baked, and may be served with jam, fruit, honey, or cream. They may also be made with creamed corn, baked, and served with maple syrup. Corn fritters can be made to have a similar appearance to, and thus be mistaken for, johnnycake.

They are sometimes called corn nuggets.

=== Peru ===
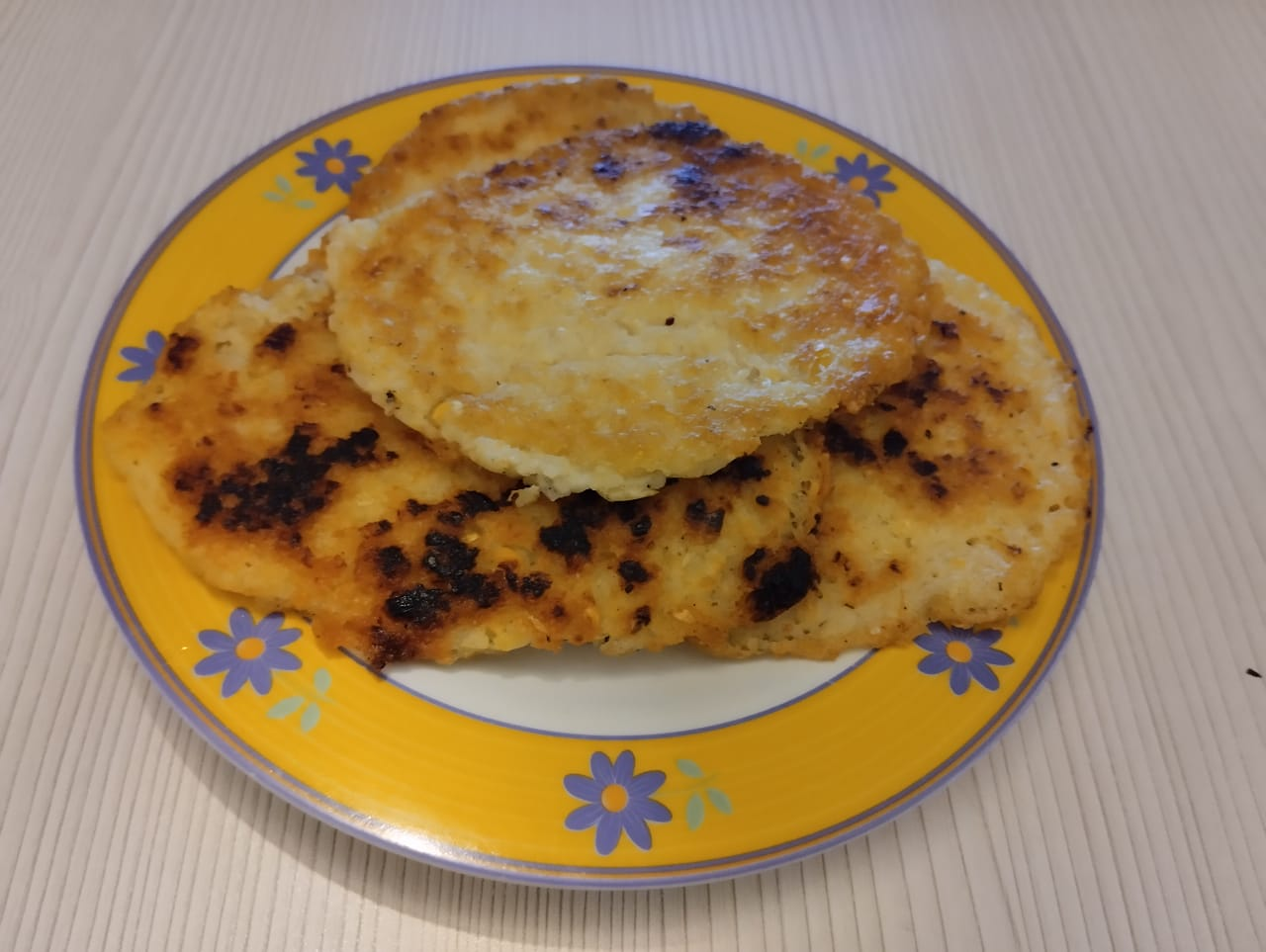
Torrejas de choclo, typical Peruvian corn fritters

Peruvian corn fritters, called torrejas de choclo, are made from choclo (Peruvian corn), an Andean variety of corn, pepper, onion and eggs. They can be deep-fried in vegetable oil and are usually served as a savory appetizer to accompany other local dishes.

=== Southeast Asia ===
Corn is believed to have been introduced in Southeast Asia from Central America in 16th century by the Portuguese or the Spanish as part of the Columbian exchange and has become integrated into Southeast Asian cuisines.

==== Cambodia ====
Cambodian corn fritters, called poat chien (Khmer: ពោតចៀន), are made from a mixture of thinly sliced corn kernels, grated coconut, coconut milk and glutinous rice flour fried in vegetable oil. They are eaten as a snack throughout the day.

==== Indonesia ====
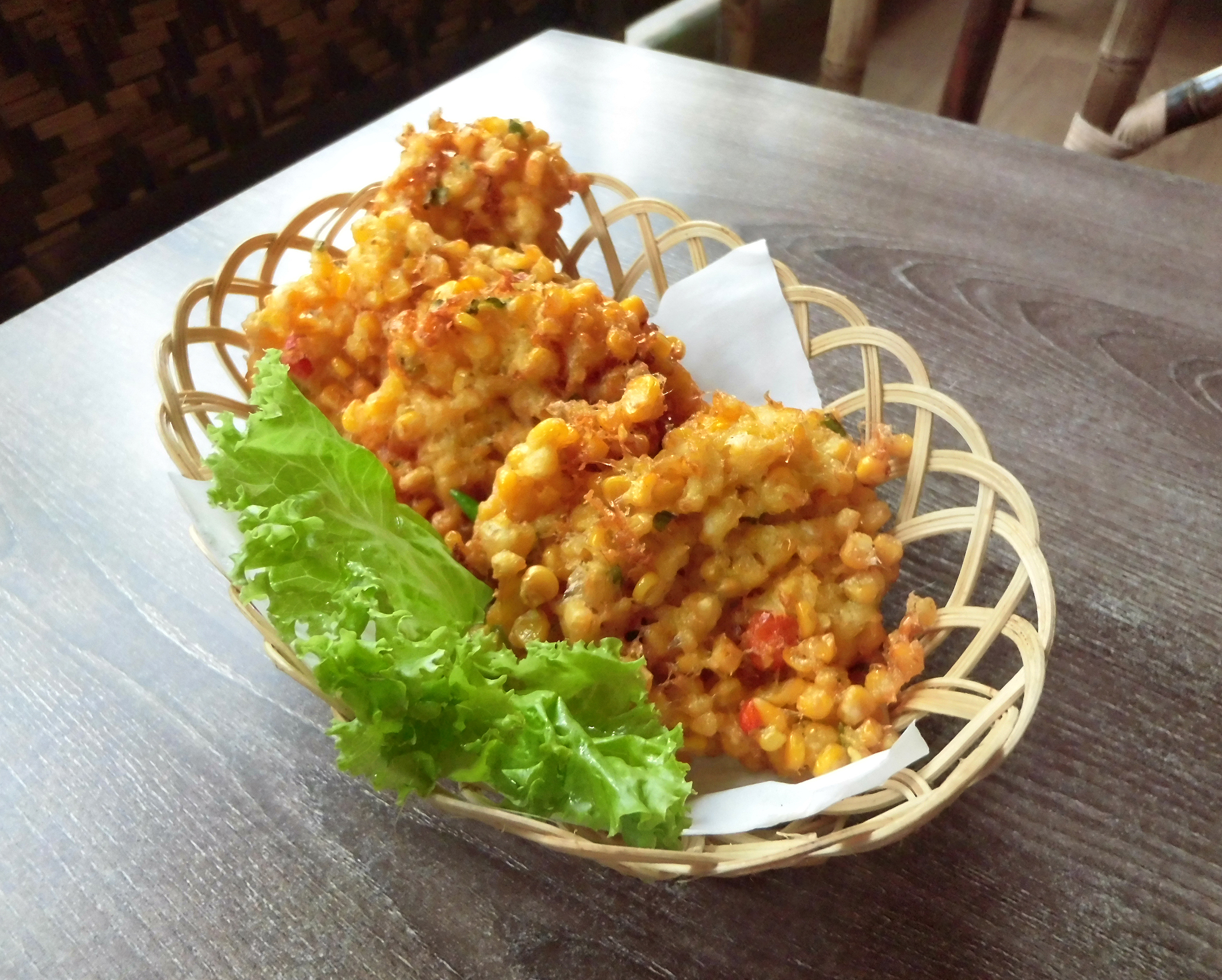
Bakwan jagung, Indonesian corn fritters

Indonesian corn fritters, a type of gorengan, are not sweet but savoury. They have a more granulated texture, as the corn kernels are not finely ground and blended into the dough, so they retain their kernel shapes. The fritter is made from fresh corn kernels, a mixture of flours including wheat flour, rice flour, corn starch, sago or tapioca, celery, scallion, eggs, shallots, garlic, salt and pepper, and deep fried in coconut oil. They are a popular snack and are often served as an appetizer.

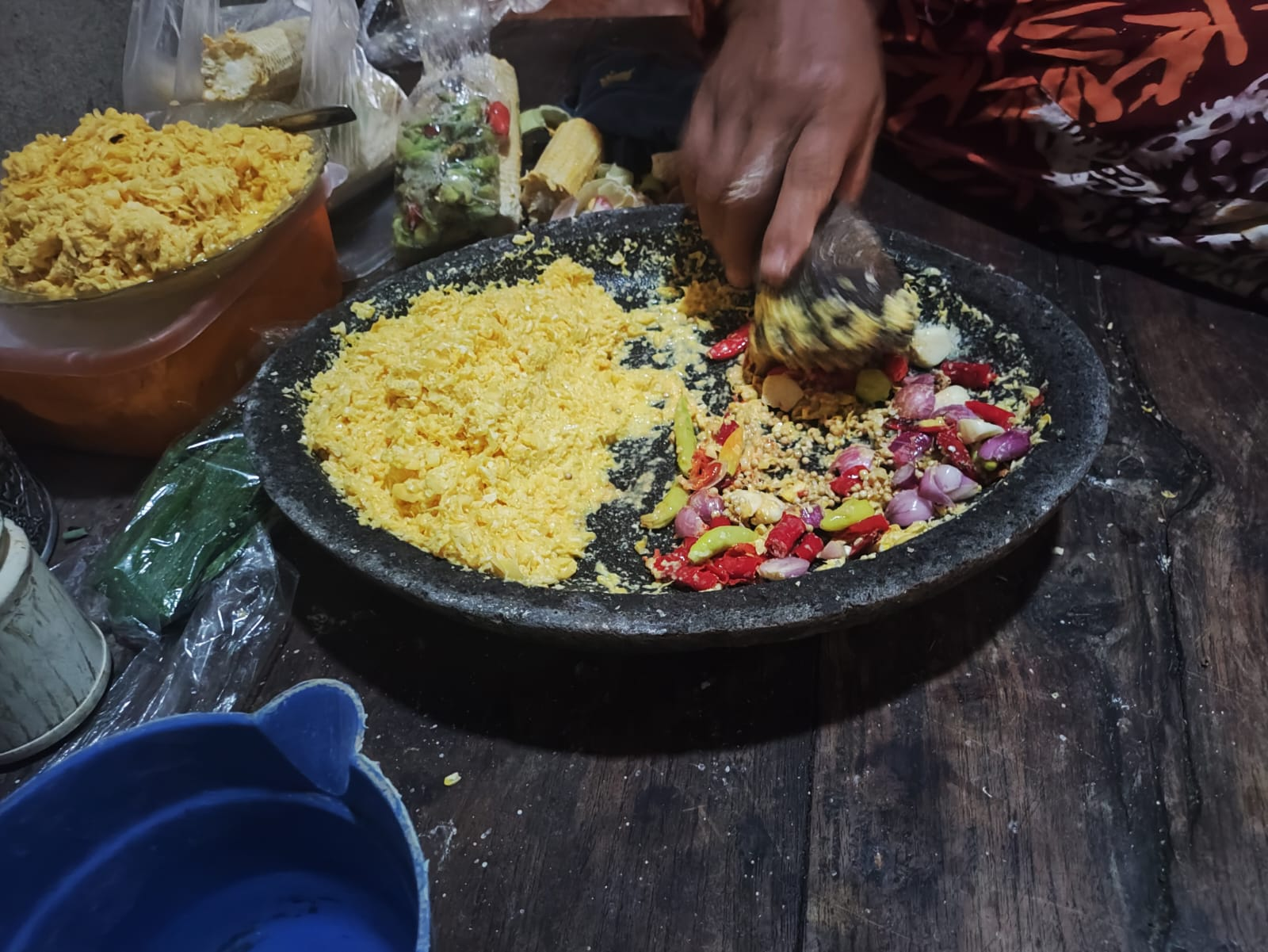
Making pelas in Bojonegoro

In Bojonegoro and Tuban, East Java, a corn fritter is called pelas. Unlike bakwan jagung, pelas uses corn which is ground with a stone mortar and pestle and mixed with spices.

A plate of paragede jaguang from Padang Panjang. Unlike its other variants in Indonesia, the dough is deep-fried in hot oil in the shape of a small tube, the size of a spoon.

In Padang Panjang, West Sumatera the corn fritter is known as paragede jaguang. The dough comes in the shape of mashed corn, with added spices and slices of herbs such as keffir lime leaves, scallions and local celery. The added spices varied but mostly ground corrianders and local chilies. When the dough is deep-fried it turns to reddish instead of yellow. Unlike its other variants which are mostly cooked flat and large in hot oil, the paragaede jaguang dough is deep fried in the shape of small tube in the size of spoon.

The snacks is the quintessential of Padang Panjang, a city that grew first as transit city in regional Sumatera that connects coastal cities in the Western coast of Sumatera such a Padang and Pariaman to cities in the Minangkabau highlands such as Bukittinggi, Payakumbuh and Batusangkar or larger city in the Eastern coast of Sumatera such as Pekanbaru and Dumai in Riau. The snacks were originally sold by independent sellers who stopped the busses that go through Padang Panjang or choose rest area around Padang Panjang and Lembah Anai.

==== Myanmar (Burma) ====
Burmese corn fritters, called pyaungbu kyaw (ပြောင်းဖူးကြော်), are a type of Burmese fritter. Pyaungbu kyaw consists of corn kernels battered in flour and eggs and deep-fried as disk-like fritters. They are savory, and are similar to Indonesian bakwan jagung.

== See also ==
- Clam cake
- Corn cookie
- Hushpuppy
- List of maize dishes
