= Nasi (Cleitoria) =

Nasi or Nasoi (Ancient Greek: Νᾶσοι) was a village in the district of Cleitoria (the territory of Cleitor) in ancient Arcadia, Greece, located on the Ladon.
