= Japanese ship Nashi =

Two ships of the Japanese Navy have been named Nashi:

- Japanese destroyer Nashi (1919), a Momi-class destroyer launched in 1919 and decommissioned in 1940.
- Japanese destroyer Nashi (1945), a Tachibana-class destroyer launched and sunk in 1945. She was salvaged in 1954 and renamed JDS Wakaba finally being struck in 1971.
