= Renato Mannheimer =

Italian pollster and sociologist

Renato Mannheimer is an Italian pollster and professor of sociology at the University of Milano-Bicocca. He has published in academic journals, and is a consultant to the daily Italian newspaper Corriere della Sera and to the Italian public service broadcaster RAI. Mannheimer founded the Institute for Public Opinion Studies (ISPO Research), an Italian polling organization, and later became a member of the advisory board of Eumetra MR. He is most famous for frequently appearing on a popular RAI's talk show to provide and comment on data measuring and tracking the Italian public's attitudes concerning political, social, and economic issue of the day.

Up until February 2014, he chaired Rome's municipal Agency For Public Services Quality. He resigned after being indicted for tax evasion. In February 2015, he pleaded guilty for tax evasion and returned €6m to the Italian Tax Administration. He did not serve any time in prison. Mannheimer publicly said he was sorry for the wrongdoing. His polling business, although less fashionable than it used to be, is still operational.
