= Pelita Nasi Kandar =

Restaurant chain in Malaysia

- Industry: Food and beverage
- Founded: 1 July 1995; 31 years ago
- Headquarters: Perai, Penang, Malaysia
- Area served: Malaysia; India; Saudi Arabia
- Products: Nasi Kandar
- Website: https://www.pelita.com.my

The Pelita Nasi Kandar (Malay: Nasi Kandar Pelita; Tamil: பெலிடா நசீ கண்டார்) is the largest nasi kandar restaurant chain in Malaysia. Its main headquarters is in Taman Chai Leng, Perai, Penang. The parent company also owns several hotels. The chain has outlets in multiple cities, including one in Chennai, India.

== History ==
The chain was founded in Butterworth, Penang as a food stall in a coffee shop in Chai Leng Park market. It opened additional outlets in the Malaysian states of Penang, Kedah, Perak, Selangor, Kuala Lumpur and Negeri Sembilan. The firm purchased a multistory building in Ampang, and because it only wanted to use the ground floor as a restaurant, the firm turned the upper stories into a hotel.

As of 2017, the chain had 28 outlets. It was included in the Malaysia Book of Records in 2016.

In 2017, the chain denied rumors that the corporation was not owned by Muslims and that therefore its food was not halal. A director who owned 25% of the company shares said he'd been attacked on social media for being Hindu. In 2019, Business Insider included the chain in their list of those they'd like to see open outlets in the US.

In March 2020, during the coronavirus pandemic, the chain announced it would close all outlets in response to the government of Malaysia's Movement Control Order.
