= Bagara khana =

Spiced rice food from Telangana, India

Bagara annam
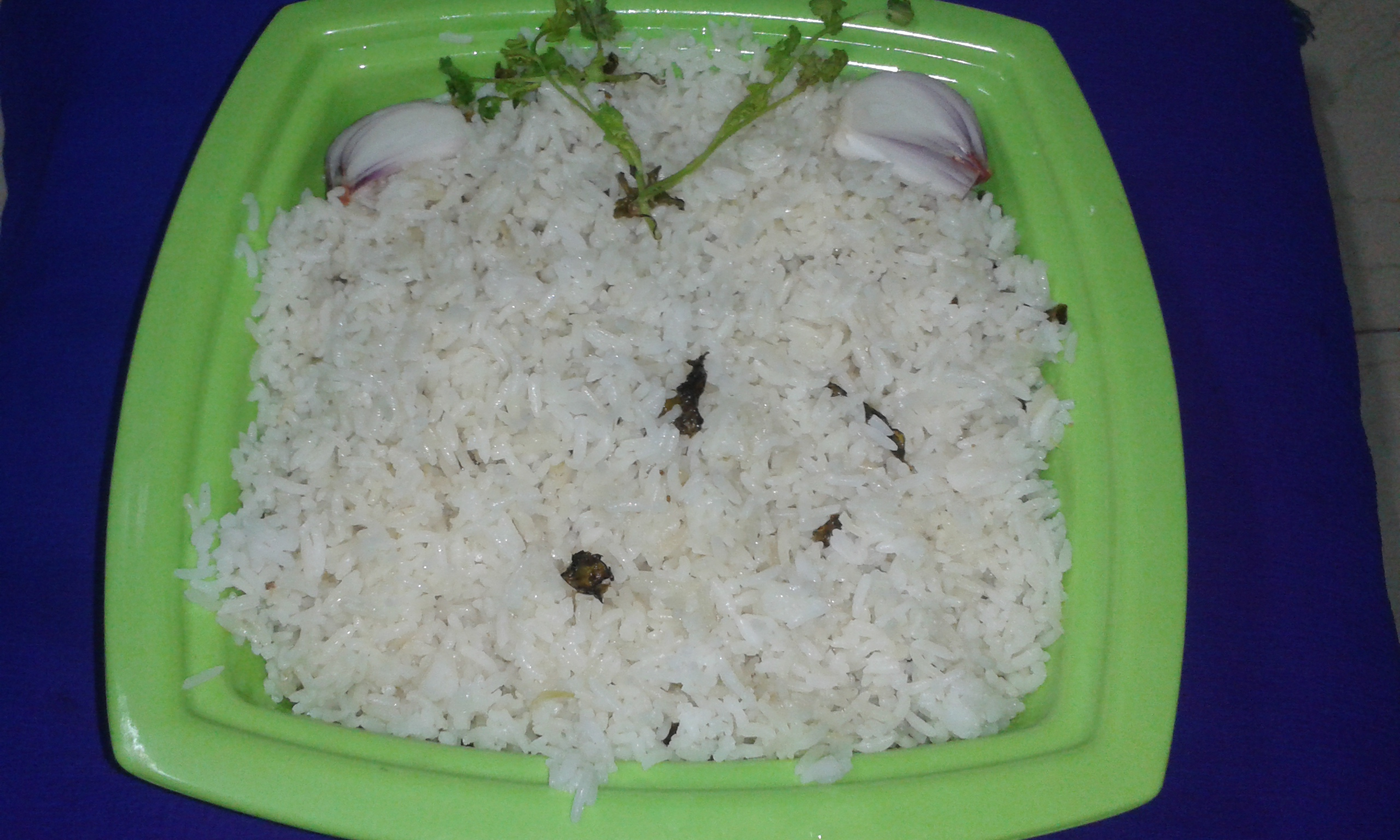
- Alternative names: Bhagara
- Place of origin: India
- Region or state: Telangana
- Serving temperature: Hot
- Main ingredients: Basmati rice, spices, green chillies
- Other information: Soya beans, vegetable and paneer can be added to make it more special.

Bagara annam is a spiced rice delicacy prepared in Hyderabad, Telangana, India. Bagar, meaning tempering, is a plain Biryani recipe without any vegetables or masala powders.

Bagara rice is also a popular dish at weddings and functions in Hyderabad and Telangana Region. For vegetarians in Telangana, this is a must have main dish.

== Ingredients ==
The ingredients are long-grained rice, dark spices, green chillies. Bagara rice pairs well with spicy curries like baghara baingan or dalcha.
