= Grammar Nazi =

Pejorative for someone who excessively criticizes grammar

Grammar Nazi iconography, an adaptation of symbolism used by the Nazi Party

Grammar Nazi (also known as Grammar Pedant, or Spelling Nazi/Pedant) is an informal, pejorative term used to describe someone who regularly corrects or criticizes minor errors in spelling, grammar, and punctuation in speech and writing. The term was coined in the 1990s on online discussion forums. While some corrections made by individuals labeled as "Grammar Nazis" are intended to be humorous, they can also be seen as perpetuating unnecessarily strict standards of language use. Discussions about such corrections often intersect with broader considerations of literacy privilege and societal norms in communication.

The use of Nazi in this context is controversial. Critics argue that the term trivializes the historical atrocities associated with Nazism.

== History ==
The term originates from Nazi, a pejorative for the National Socialist German Worker's Party (NSDAP) which was in power between 1933 and 1945. The Nazi regime was extremely totalitarian, suppressing and punishing any expression that countered its agenda. After World War II, the term nazi was adopted in the English language as a reference to somebody who is stubbornly restrictive and authoritarian about something.

The use of Nazi as a term for a pedant can be traced at least as far back as 1982, to an article written in Inquiry Magazine by P. J. O'Rourke, entitled "Safety Nazis". The earliest known use of the term Grammar Nazi is in a Usenet forum dedicated to discussing the Apple II. On January 18, 1991, a user known as "The Unknown User" corrected the spelling of another user's post, with arguably the first use of the term "Grammar Nazi":

Ok, I posted a message on this subject earlier with sort of a "rediculous" ridiculous. I'm a card carrying member of the Spelling and Grammar Nazis of America.

A later pop-culture reference to Nazism as pedantry was in a 1995 episode of the sitcom Seinfeld, entitled "The Soup Nazi". In the episode, Jerry and his friends visit a new soup stand, operated by a man known as the "Soup Nazi", due to his strict insistence on the behavioral expectations of his patrons.

The term did not find much popularity until the mid-2000s, coinciding with the rise of social media. Platforms like Facebook, Reddit, and X (formerly Twitter) have not only made it easier to spot linguistic errors, but have also provided a public stage for such corrections to be displayed. Users often engage in fast-paced, real-time, written communication, which increases the frequency of spelling mistakes, whose visibility allows frequent and public corrections. These interactions sometimes foster communities centered around linguistic precision, but they can also lead to debates about the appropriateness of strict adherence to grammatical rules in casual conversation. Grammar pedantry has shown to be somewhat effective in teaching English learners internationally, though it can also discourage non-native English speakers due to fear of ridicule.

The 2013 song "Word Crimes" by "Weird Al" Yankovic satirizes those who use poor grammar, as well as those who obsess over enforcing proper grammar. In 2016, Filipino musician Reese Lansangan released the song "Grammar Nazi," which humorously details a woman's frustrations with her love interest's poor grammar. The song, which gained viral popularity, has even been used in Thailand to teach English.

== Criticisms ==
A common criticism of "Grammar Nazis" is their insistence on linguistic prescription—strict adherence to traditional grammar rules. While their focus on linguistic accuracy aims to promote clarity, it can detract from effective communication by overemphasizing minute details.

Many people argue that calling someone a "Grammar Nazi" trivializes the term Nazi, a word strongly associated with the atrocities committed during World War II. Critics contend that using such a charged term in a casual context undermines the historical significance of the Holocaust, reducing it to a figure of speech. This trivialization is particularly contentious among individuals and communities affected by the Nazi regime. The casual overuse of terms like Nazi in colloquial language reflects a broader trend of hyperbolic expressions in modern discourse, which some argue dilutes the meaning of historically controversial terms.

== See also ==
- Fascist (insult)
- Godwin's law
- Reductio ad Hitlerum
