= Konstantinos Nazis =

- Birth name: Konstantinos Anastasiadis
- Born: 9 August 1993 (age 31); Nea Vrasna, Thessaloniki, Greece
- Occupation(s): Singer, composer
- Years active: 2010–present

Konstantinos Anastasiadis (Greek: Κωνσταντίνος Αναστασιάδης; born 9 August 1993) known professionally as Konstantinos Nazis (Greek: Κωνσταντίνος Νάζης), is a Greek singer.

== Biography ==
He lives in Nea Vrasna of Thessaloniki and his sign is Leo. His favorite singers are Christos Dantis, Michalis Hatzigiannis and Muse. In X-Factor, he would definitely want to sing Muse 'Undisclosed'. His hobby is basketball. At the age of 15 he was a singer at the band Riot and with them, he did concerts in schools. He has been doing vocal classes for 2 years and is self-taught in the guitar.

== Career ==
During 2016, he rose to fame with his appearance on Knock Out's Otan Ponao Do Glentao. The same year he has also released his own hits Egefailka, Se Ola Nai and Thelo Ta Dika Sou Ta Filia of which the latter has more than 10 million views on YouTube as of late November 2024.

However, this is not his first time in the spotlight. Back in 2010–2011 Konstantinos appeared on the Greek X-factor as Konstantinos Anastasiadis where he made it to the live shows. He finished 7th on the popular TV-show.

== Discography ==
- As Konstantinos Anastasiadis:
  - 2011 – Puzzle (Πάζλ)
  - 2012 – Pio Konta (Πιο Κοντά)
  - 2013 – Pes Mou (Πες Μου)
  - 2013 – Kalokerinos O Keros (Καλοκαιρινός Ο Καιρός)
  - 2014 – Ena Haos Me Sena (Ένα Χάος Με Σένα)
  - 2014 – Magkiko Fili (Μαγικό Φιλί)
  - 2014 – Thelo Ta Dika Sou Filia (Gyrna Piso) (Θέλω Τα Δικά Σου Φιλιά (Γύρνα Πίσω) )
  - 2015 – Ola Gia Sena (Όλα για σένα)
- As Konstantinos Nazis:
  - 2015 – Thelo Ta Dika Sou Filia (Θέλω Τα Δικά Σου Φιλιά)
  - 2015 – Otan Ponao To Glentao (Όταν πονάω το γλεντάω) ft. Knock Out
  - 2016 – Se Ola Nai (Σε Όλα Ναι)
  - 2016 – Egkefalika (Εγκεφαλικά)
  - 2017 – Po Po Po (Πω Πω Πω ft. Lefteris Pantazis)
  - 2017 – Apopse Vgale Ta Kala Sou (Απόψε Βγάλε τα Καλά σου)
  - 2018 – Ta Psyhologika Mou (Τα Ψυχολογικά Μου)
  - 2018 – Depon
  - 2018 – Ena Chaos Me Sena (Ένα χάος με σένα)
  - 2019 – Stou Kormiou Sou Ta Palatia (Στου κορμιού σου τα παλάτια ft. Zanis Knock Out)
  - 2019 – Makria Sou Den Zo (Μακριά σου δε ζω)
