= Nazi, Chaharmahal and Bakhtiari =

Nazi نازی
- village
- Location within Iran
- Coordinates: 32°13′09″N 50°07′48″E
- Country: Iran
- Province: Chaharmahal and Bakhtiari
- County: Kuhrang
- Bakhsh: Bazoft
- Rural District: Bazoft

Population (2006)
  - Total: 41
- Time zone: UTC+3:30 (IRST)
  - Summer (DST): UTC+4:30 (IRDT)

Nazi (Persian: ناری, also Romanized as Nāzī; also known as Nāzīābād) is a village in Bazoft Rural District, Bazoft District, Kuhrang County, Chaharmahal and Bakhtiari Province, Iran. According to the 2006 census, its population was 41, in 9 families. The village is populated by ethnic Lurs.
