= Nasi ambeng =

Javanese rice dish

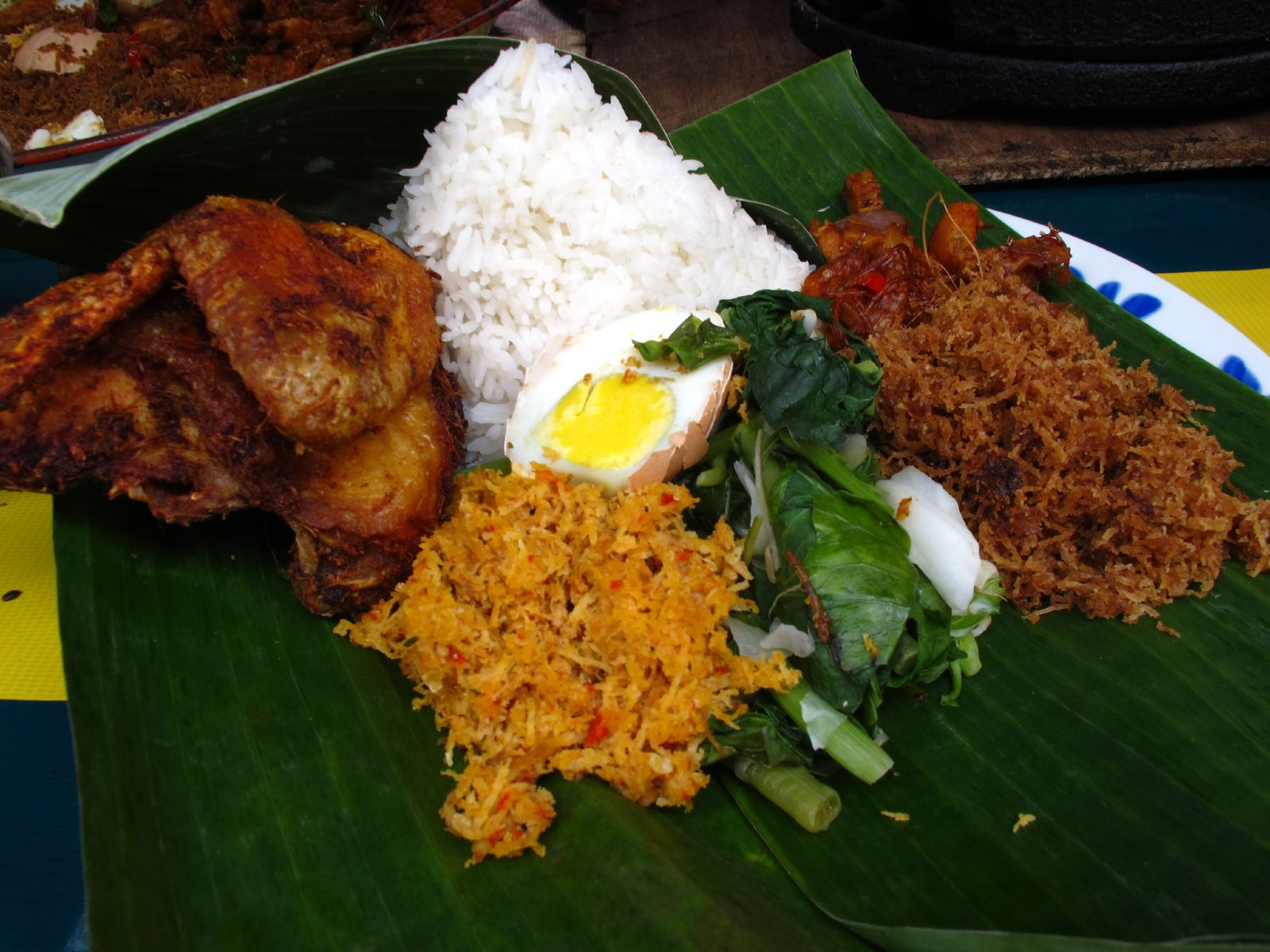
- A serving of nasi ambeng
- Course: Main course
- Place of origin: Indonesia
- Region or state: Java
- Associated cuisine: Javanese cuisine (also including Javanese diaspora)
- Created by: Javanese
- Main ingredients: Steamed rice, fried tempeh, perkedel, rempeyek, rendang, sambal goreng, boiled egg, urap

Nasi ambeng (from Javanese ꦤꦱꦶꦲꦩ꧀ꦧꦼꦁ 'nasi ambêng') is an Indonesian (Javanese) fragrant rice dish that consists of—but is not limited to—steamed white rice, chicken curry or chicken stewed in soy sauce, beef or chicken rendang, sambal goreng (lit. fried sambal; a mildly spicy stir-fried relish commonly made with firm tofu, tempeh, and long beans) urap, perkedel, and serundeng.

It is a popular food in Javanese cuisine, especially within the Javanese diaspora communities in Singapore and the Malaysian states of Johor and Selangor where they also added fried noodles as additional condiments.

Nasi ambeng is often served communal dining-style on a platter to be shared among four to five people, especially during festive or special occasions such as a kenduri.

== See also ==
- Nasi campur
- Nasi bakar
- Javanese cuisine
- Tumpeng
