= Nazi, Markazi =

Nazi نازي
- Village
- Location within Iran
- Coordinates: 33°42′56″N 50°04′38″E
- Country: Iran
- Province: Markazi
- County: Khomeyn
- Bakhsh: Central
- Rural District: Hamzehlu

Population (2006)
  - Total: 155
- Time zone: UTC+3:30 (IRST)
  - Summer (DST): UTC+4:30 (IRDT)

Nazi (Persian: نازي, also Romanized as Nāzī; also known as Nāzīyeh) is a village in Hamzehlu Rural District, in the Central District of Khomeyn County, Markazi Province, Iran. At the 2006 census, its population was 155, in 42 families.
