= Perkedel =

Indonesian vegetable fritters

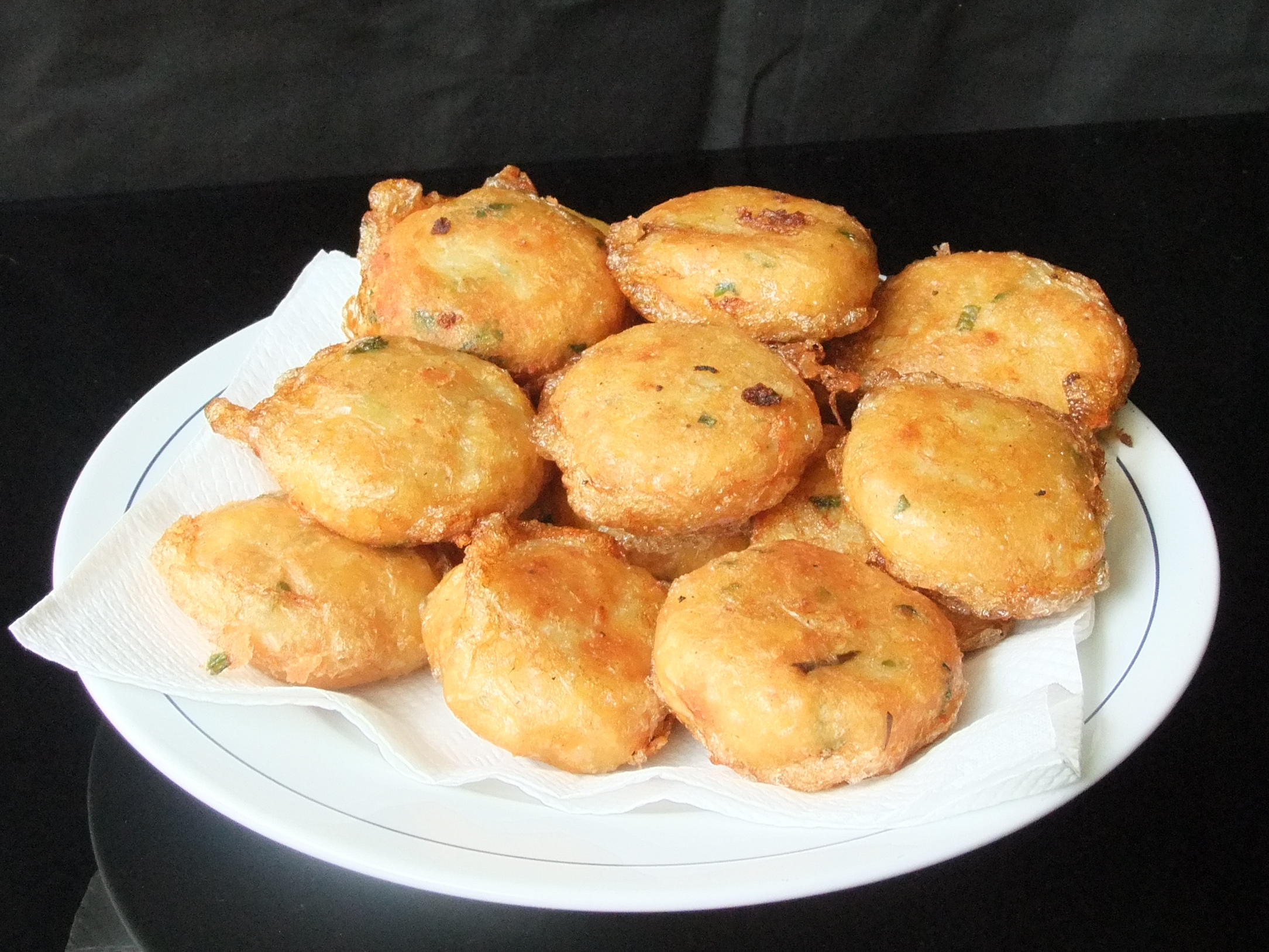
- Perkedel kentang using potato
- Alternative names: Bergedel, bergedil, begedil, bakwan jagung
- Type: Fritter
- Region or state: Java, Sumatra
- Associated cuisine: Indonesian, Malaysian
- Serving temperature: Hot or room temperature
- Main ingredients: Batter (wheat flour, corn starch, egg), chili pepper, corn, carrot, seasoning
- Variations: Perkedel jagung (maize), perkedel tahu (tofu), perkedel ikan (fish)
- Other information: As a side dish, generally served with soto ayam

Perkedel or begedil (Javanese: ꦧꦼꦒꦼꦢꦶꦭ꧀) are vegetable fritters from particularly Javanese cuisine in Indonesia, as well as spread by Javanese immigrants to Malaysia and Singapore. They are most commonly made from mashed potatoes; however, there are other popular variations, such as perkedel jagung (maize perkedel), perkedel tahu (tofu perkedel), and perkedel ikan (minced fish perkedel).

== Origin ==
Perkedel is believed to be derived from Dutch frikadellen, which is actually a Dutch meatball or minced meat dish. This was owed to Indonesian historical and colonial link to the Netherlands. Unlike frikadellen, the perkedel's main ingredient is not meat, but mashed potato.

== Ingredients ==
Prior to mashing, the potato slices, however, are not boiled as that can cause the perkedel to be too mushy, but deep fried or baked instead. The mashed fried potato is mixed, as much as 1:1 ratio, with ground meat or corned beef. However, sometimes common perkedel contains less or no meat at all. Other than mashed potato, cabe rawit, spring onion, shrimp, fish, peeled corn, or mashed tofu fritters are also common as perkedel ingredients.

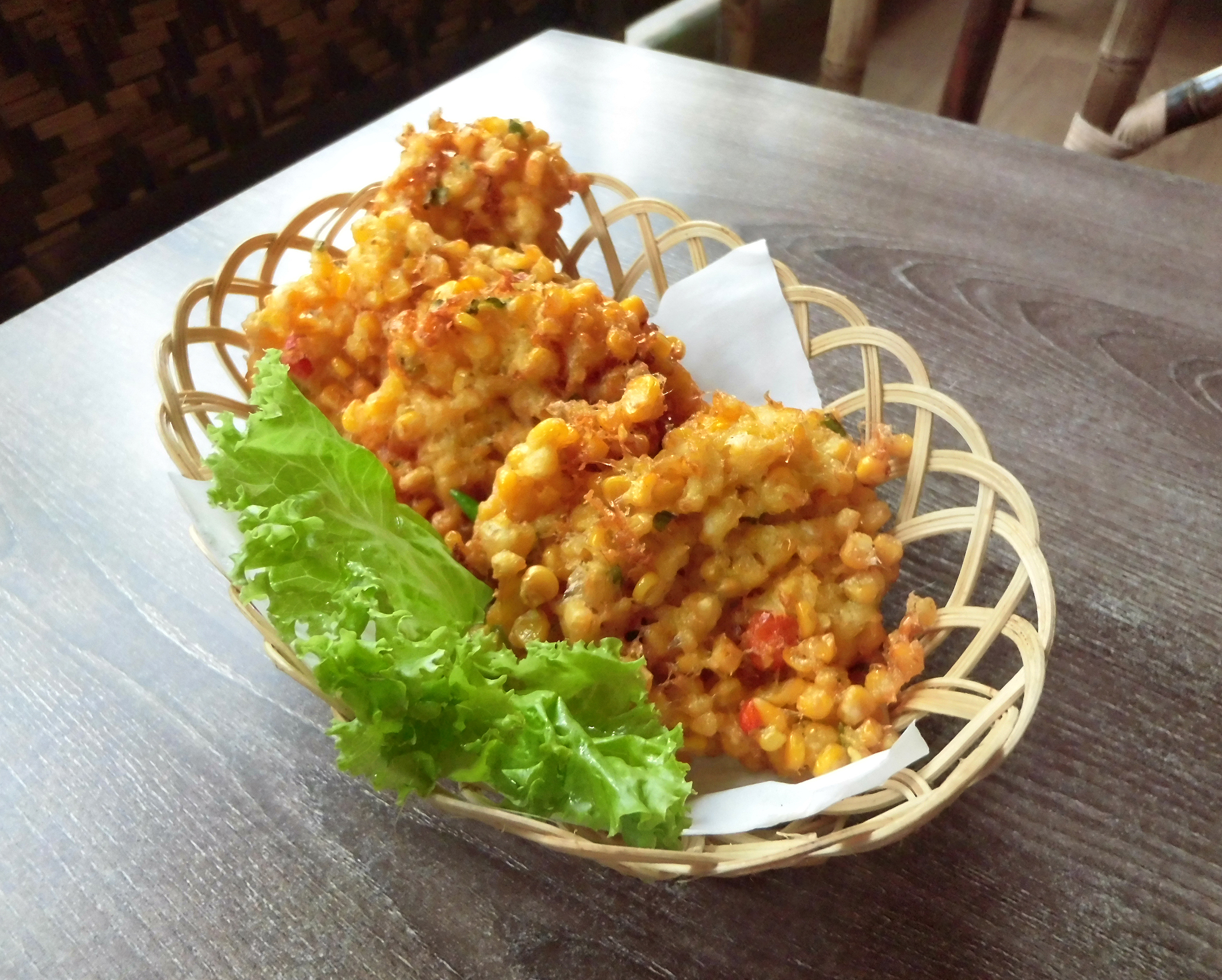
Corn (jagung) perkedel, also known as bakwan jagung

The mixture is then mixed with chopped scallion and seasoned with white pepper powder, then shaped into flat round patties and dipped in egg yolk or beaten egg, before being deep fried.

The potato mix may also be stuffed into tofu puffs before frying in a type common in Malaysia known as tauhu begedil (not to be confused with the perkedel tahu above), it is a popular street snack served with a chilli soy dip (sambal kicap).

== Serving ==
Perkedel is a popular dish, either for a side dish or an appetizer. In Indonesia, it is usually served with nasi kuning as part of tumpeng, soto ayam chicken soup to common sayur sop (vegetable-chicken soup).

== See also ==
- Frikadeller
- Bitterballen
- Gorengan
- Hash browns, a similar dish made from potatoes.
- Rösti
