= Dalcha =

Indian culinary dish

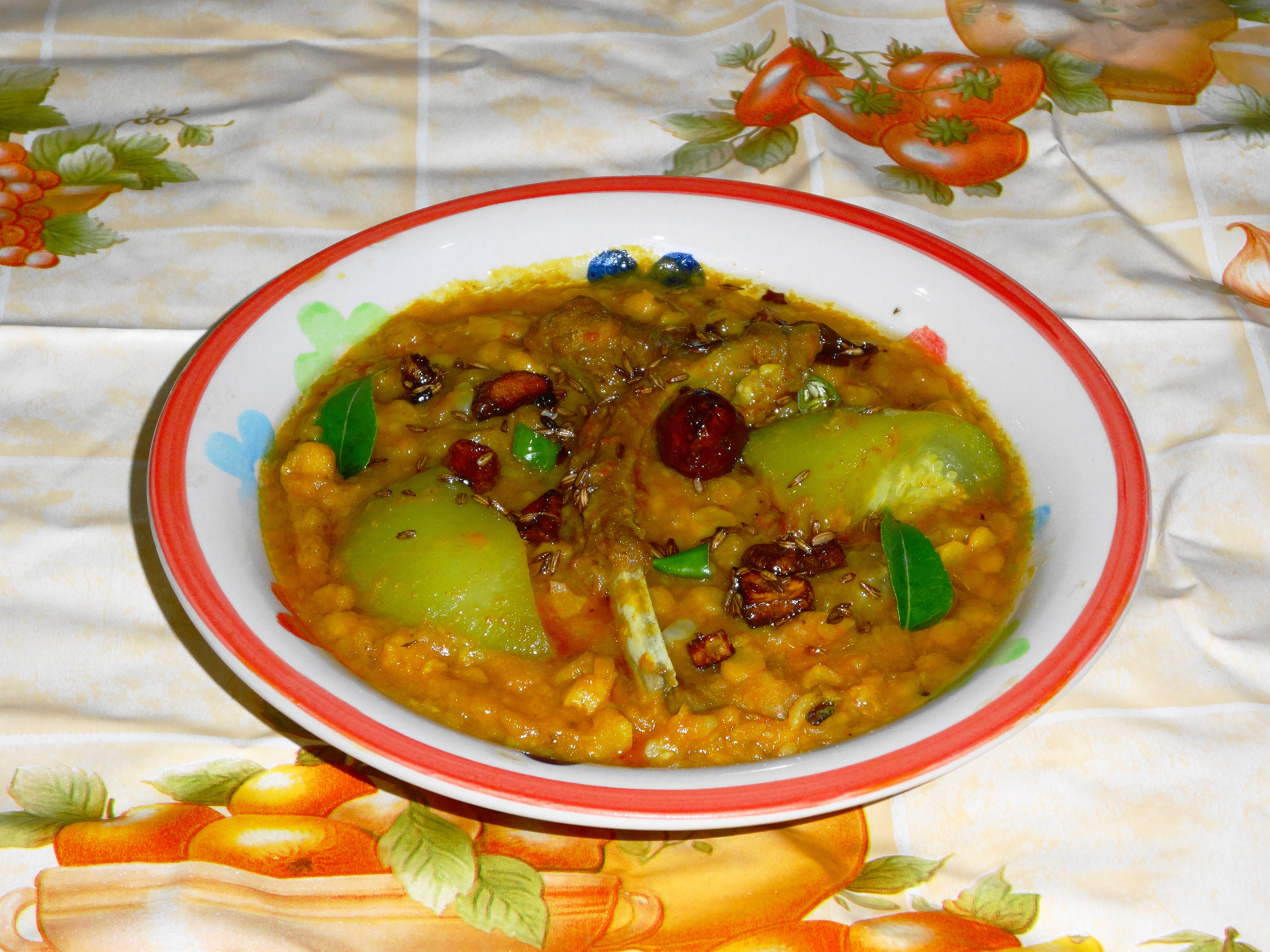
- Alternative names: dal mai dooba hua mutton
- Course: Main course
- Place of origin: India
- Region or state: Hyderabad, Telangana
- Created by: Shah Jahan
- Serving temperature: with rice
- Main ingredients: Mutton, chana dal, tamarind
- Variations: Sambar

Dalcha is an Indian lentil-based stew originating from Hyderabad, Telangana. Its origins may lie with a similar Middle Eastern dish, harees, which is more of a gruel with cooked meats. Primary ingredients include lentils, which can be chana dal or sometimes tur dal. Vegetables or meats, both chicken or mutton may also be added to the stew. If mutton is added it is called a mutton dalcha. Bottle gourd is another key ingredient in a dalcha. It is traditionally served with the rice dish called bagara khana.

== History ==
Despite being of Indian origin, dalcha is commonly served at Malay weddings in Malaysia and Singapore.

== See also ==
- List of lamb dishes
