= History of Indian cuisine =

The history of Indian cuisine consists of cuisine of the Indian subcontinent, which is rich and diverse. The diverse climate in the region, ranging from deep tropical to alpine, has also helped considerably broaden the set of ingredients readily available to the many schools of cookery in India. In many cases, food has become a marker of religious and social identity, with varying taboos and preferences (for instance, a segment of the Jain population consume no roots or subterranean vegetable; see Jain vegetarianism) which has also driven these groups to innovate extensively with the food sources that are deemed acceptable.

One strong influence over Indian foods is the longstanding vegetarianism within sections of Hindu and Jain communities. At 31%, slightly less than a third of Indians are vegetarians.

== Historic developments ==
Indian cuisine reflects an 8,000-year history of various groups and cultures interacting with the Indian subcontinent, leading to diversity of flavours and regional cuisines found in modern-day India. Later, trade with British and Portuguese influence added to the already diverse Indian cuisine.

=== Prehistory and Indus Valley Civilization exchanges with Sumeria and Mesopotamia ===
After 9000 BCE, a first period of indirect contacts between the Fertile Crescent and the Indus Valley seems to have occurred as a consequence of the Neolithic Revolution and the diffusion of agriculture. (Note: According to Ahmad Hasan Dani, professor emeritus at Quaid-e-Azam University, Islamabad, the discovery of Mehrgarh "changed the entire concept of the Indus civilisation […] There we have the whole sequence, right from the beginning of settled village life.", ref "Chandler 34–42") Around 7000 BCE, agriculture spread from the Fertile Crescent to the Indus Valley, and wheat and barley began to be grown. Sesame and humped cattle were domesticated in the local farming communities. Mehrgarh is one of the earliest sites with evidence of farming and herding in South Asia. (Note: Excavations at Bhirrana, Haryana, in India between 2006 and 2009, by archaeologist K.N. Dikshit, provided six artefacts, including "relatively advanced pottery," so-called Hakra ware, which were dated at a time bracket between 7380 and 6201 BCE. These dates compete with Mehrgarh for being the oldest site for cultural remains in the area. Yet, Dikshit and Mani clarify that this time-bracket concerns only charcoal samples, which were radio-carbon dated at respectively 7570–7180 BCE (sample 2481) and 6689–6201 BCE (sample 2333). Dikshit further writes that the earliest phase concerns 14 shallow dwelling-pits which "could accommodate about 3–4 people." According to Dikshit, in the lowest level of these pits wheel-made Hakra Ware was found which was "not well finished," together with other wares.) By 3000 BCE, turmeric, cardamom, black pepper and mustard were harvested in India. From Around 2350 BCE the evidence for imports from the Indus to Ur in Mesopotamia have been found, as well as Clove heads which are thought to originate from the Moluccas in Maritime Southeast Asia were found in a 2nd millennium BC site in Terqa. Akkadian Empire records mention timber, carnelian and ivory as being imported from Meluhha by Meluhhan ships, Meluhha being generally considered as the Mesopotamian name for the Indus Valley Civilization.

=== Vedic and vegetarian Buddhist exchanges with Roman empire and influence on Southeast Asia ===
The ancient Hindu text Mahabharata mentions rice and vegetable cooked together, and the word "pulao" or "pallao" is used to refer to the dish in ancient Sanskrit works, such as Yājñavalkya Smṛti. Ayurveda, ancient Indian system of wellness, deals with holistic approach to wellness, and it includes food, dhyana {meditation} and yoga.

Thai cuisine was influenced by Indian cuisine as recorded by the Thai monk Buddhadasa Bhikku in his writing ‘India's Benevolence to Thailand’. He wrote that Thai people learned how to use spices in their food in various ways from Indians. Thais also obtained the methods of making herbal medicines (Ayurveda) from the Indians. Some plants like sarabhi of family Guttiferae, kanika or harsinghar, phikun or Mimusops elengi and bunnak or the rose chestnut etc. were brought from India.

Filipino cuisine, found throughout the Philippines archipelago, has been historically influenced by the Indian cuisine.

=== Cuisine exchange with Central Asian and Islamic world ===
Later, arrivals from Arabia, Central Asia, and centuries of trade relations and cultural exchange resulted in a significant influence on each region's cuisines, such as the adoption of the tandoor in Middle East which had originated in northwestern India.

=== Cuisine exchange during European colonial period ===
The Portuguese and British during their rule introduced cooking techniques such as baking, and foods from the New World and Europe. The new-world vegetables popular in cuisine from the Indian subcontinent include tomato, potato, sweet potatoes, peanuts, squash, and chilli. Most New world vegetables such as sweet potatoes, potatoes, Amaranth, peanuts and cassava based Sago are allowed on Hindu fasting days. Cauliflower was introduced by the British in 1822. In the late 18th/early 19th century, an autobiography of a Scottish Robert Lindsay mentions a Sylheti man called Saeed Ullah cooking a curry for Lindsay's family. This is possibly the oldest record of Indian cuisine in the United Kingdom.

== Contemporary developments ==
In 2019, according to data released by United Nations, 17.5 million of overseas Indians formed the world's largest diaspora, including 3.4 million in UAE, 2.7 million in USA, and 2.4 million in Saudi Arabia. Indian migration has spread the culinary traditions of the subcontinent throughout the world. These cuisines have been adapted to local tastes, and have also affected local cuisines. Curry's international appeal has been compared to that of pizza.

The UK's first Indian restaurant, the Hindoostanee Coffee House, opened in 1810. By 2003, there were as many as 10,000 restaurants serving Indian cuisine in England and Wales alone; 90% of Indian restaurants in the UK are run by British Bangladeshis. According to Britain's Food Standards Agency, the Indian food industry in the United Kingdom is worth 3.2 billion pounds, accounts for two-thirds of all eating out and serves about 2.5 million customers every week. A survey by The Washington Post in 2007 stated that more than 1,200 Indian food products had been introduced into the United States since 2000.

Indian cuisine is very popular in Southeast Asia, due to the strong Hindu and Buddhist cultural influence in the region. Indian cuisine has had considerable influence on Malaysian cooking styles and also enjoys popularity in Singapore. There are numerous North and South Indian restaurants in Singapore, mostly in Little India. Singapore is also known for fusion cuisine combining traditional Singaporean cuisine with Indian influences. Fish head curry, for example, is a local creation. Indian influence on Malay cuisine dates to the 19th century. Other cuisines which borrow inspiration from Indian cooking styles include Cambodian, Lao, Filipino, Vietnamese, Indonesian, Thai, and Burmese cuisines. The spread of vegetarianism in other parts of Asia is often credited to Hindu and Buddhist practices.

A 2019 research paper by US economist Joel Waldfogel, based on travel data from TripAdvisor, affirmed India's soft power which ranked Indian cuisine fourth most popular. Italian, Japanese & Chinese food being top 3. Indian cuisine is especially most popular in United Kingdom, South Korea, Thailand, Japan, Germany, France and US. In another 2019 survey of 25,000 people cross 34 countries, the largest fans of India cuisine who have tried it are the Indians (93%), British (84%), Singaporeans (77%), Norwegians (75%), Australians (74%), French (71%), Finnish (71%), Malaysians (70%), Indonesians (49%), Vietnamese (44%), Thai (27%), and mainland Chinese (26%).

The popularity of Indian cuisine has been attributed to a large number of distinct diaspora and fusion Indian cuisines such as Indian Chinese cuisine, Malaysian Indian cuisine, Indian Singaporean cuisine (based on Tamil cuisine), and Anglo-Indian cuisine (developed during the British Raj in India with adoption of western dishes with Indian ingredients).

== Gallery ==
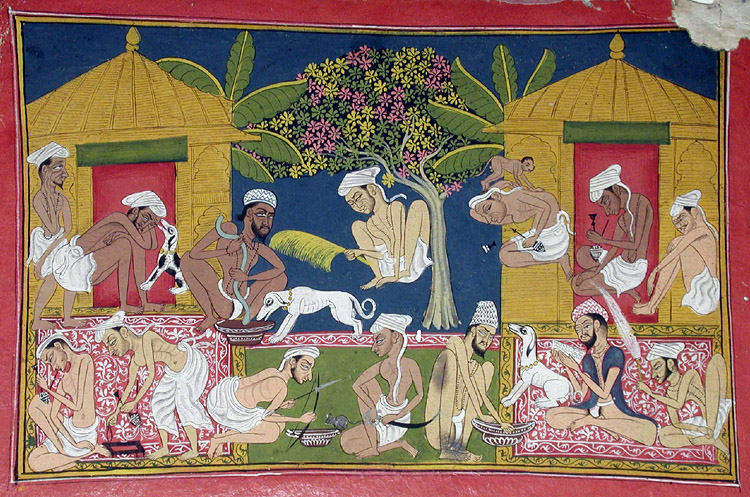
Bhang eaters from India c. 1790. Bhang is an edible preparation of cannabis native to the Indian subcontinent. It has been used in food and drink as early as 1000 BCE by Hindus in ancient India.

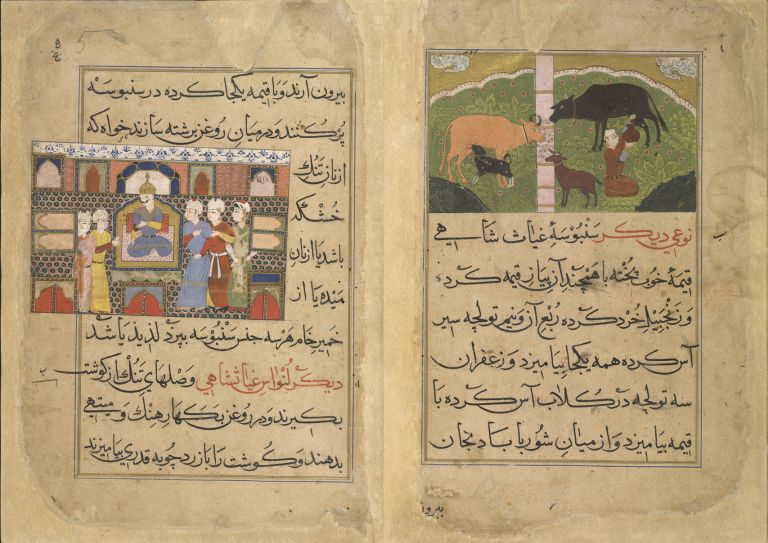
A page from the Nimatnama-i-Nasiruddin-Shahi, book of delicacies and recipes. It documents the fine art of making kheer.

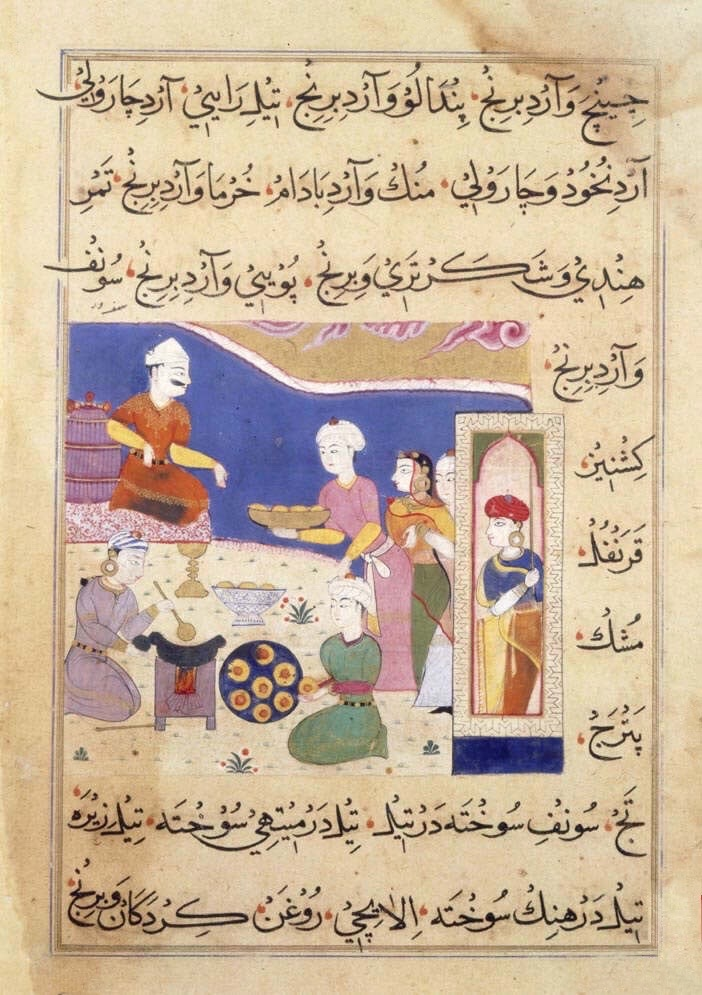
Medieval Indian Manuscript Nimatnama-i-Nasiruddin-Shahi (circa 16th century) showing samosas being served.

== See also ==
- Indian cookbooks
- Ayurveda
