= Chicken and rice =

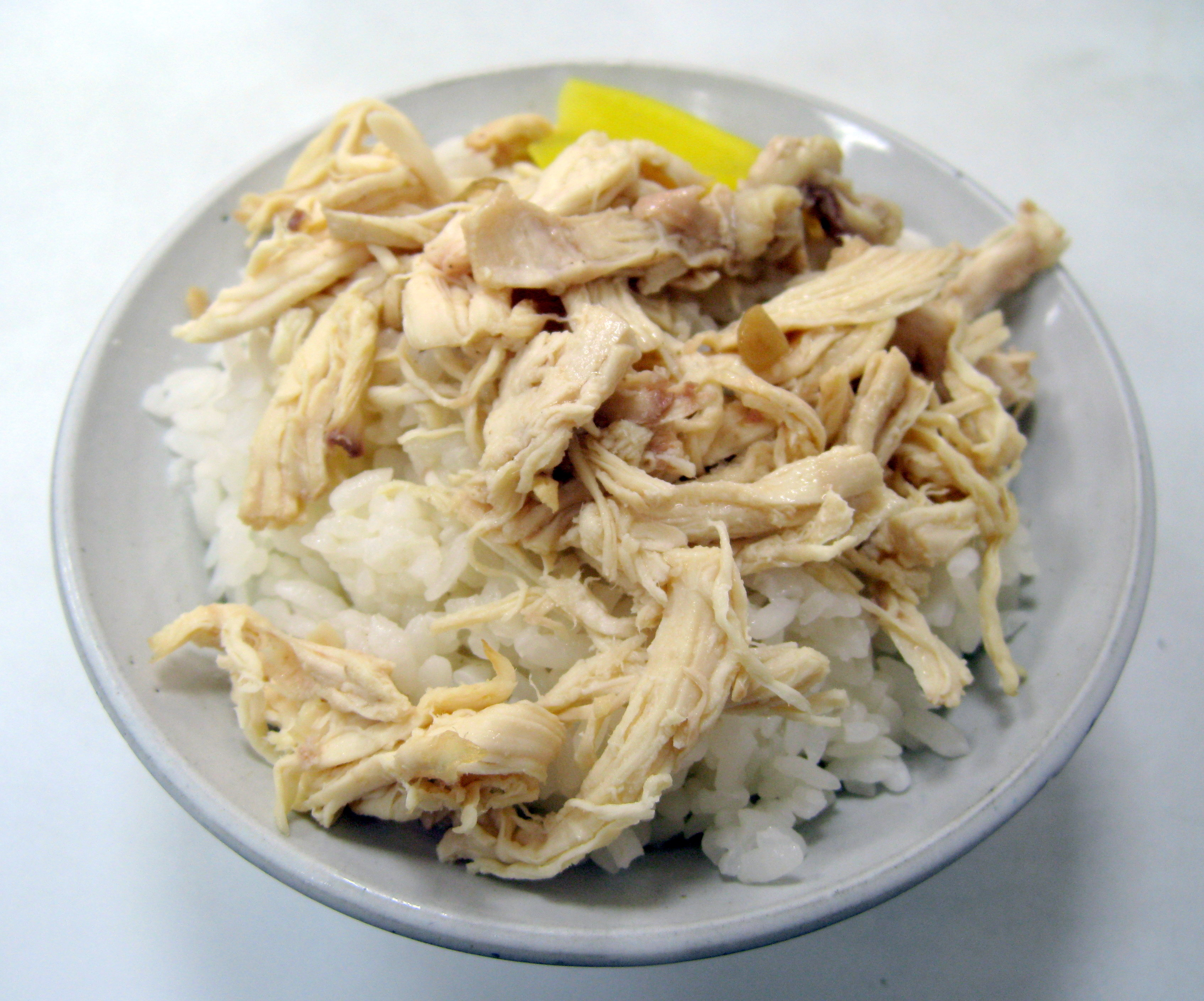

Chicken and rice is a common food combination in several cultures which have both chicken and rice as staple foods.

Examples include:

- Arroz con pollo, a Latin American dish
- Chikin raisu (chicken rice, rice pan-fried with ketchup and chicken) (ja), an ingredient in Japanese omurice
- Claypot chicken rice, a clay pot dish popular in China, Malaysia, and Singapore
- Hainanese chicken rice, a Singaporean dish created by Hainanese immigrants
- KFC rice, a Japanese dish of rice steamed with fried chicken in a rice cooker
- The Chicken Rice Shop, a Malaysian restaurant chain specializing in Hainanese chicken rice
