= Indian Singaporean cuisine =

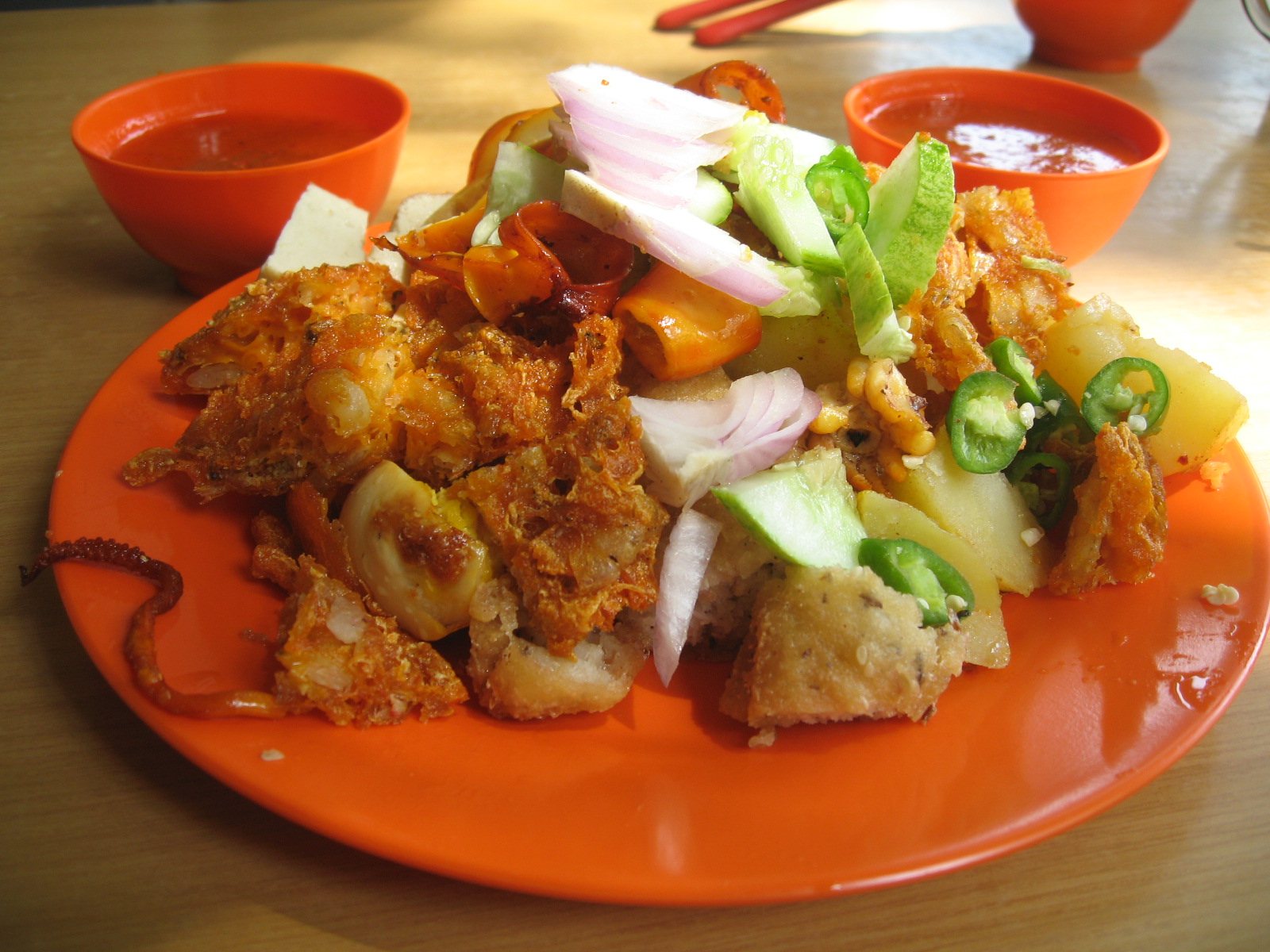
Indian rojak.

Indian Singaporean cuisine refers to food and beverages produced and consumed in Singapore that are derived, wholly or in part, from South Asian culinary traditions. The great variety of Singapore food includes Indian food, which tends to be Tamil cuisine and especially local Tamil Muslim cuisine, although North Indian food has become more visible recently. Indian dishes have become modified to different degrees, after years of contact with other Singapore cultures, and in response to locally available ingredients as well as changing local tastes.

== History ==
See influence of Indian cuisine in Malaysia, due to Indianisation as part of Greater India as Malaysia and Southeast Asia have been historically influenced by the Indian culture, religion and cuisine.

== Dishes ==
The local forms of Indian food may be seen as localised or even regional variations of Indian food, or in some cases, a form of hybrid Indian-Singaporean cuisine. Popular 'Indian' dishes and elements of Indian cuisine (although sometimes prepared and sold by non-Indians) include:

- Satti Sorru:Indian claypot rice
- Pickle - Indian pickle of mixed vegetables. Now also served by Chinese and Malays with their traditional food.
- Nasi biryani - Popular Indian dish of saffron rice and meat. It is sold by both Indians and Malays, and is essential at both Malay and Indian weddings.
- Curry - The basic Indian vegetable or meat gravy. It is now ubiquitous in local Chinese and Malay 'traditional' cuisine. A Peranakan example is Laksa, whose name derives from the Sanskrit for 'hundred thousand'. A Eurasian example is Devil's curry, while a Chinese example is Chilli crab.
- Fish head curry - Iconic Singapore dish, invented by Indians (specifically one Mr. Marian Jacob Gomez, from Kerala) for the Chinese palate which values textures. In India, it is popular in toddy shops in Kerala.
- Indian Rojak - Salad of deep fried battered potatoes, eggs, seafood, tofu and other items. Served with a hot and sweet chilli sauce. The dish does not exist in India and is unique to Singapore and its region.
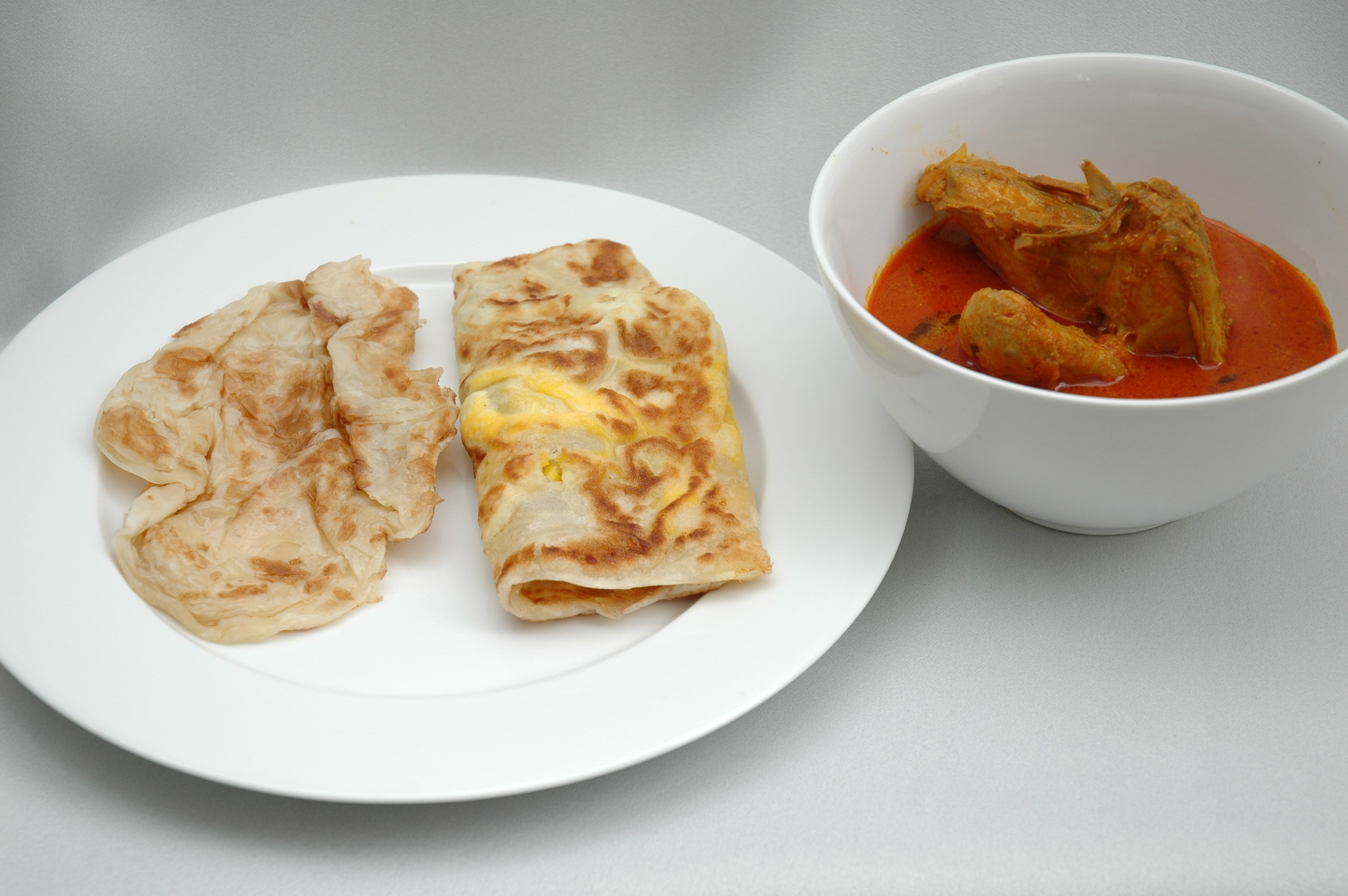
  Roti Prata with chicken curry.
- Indian Mee goreng - Chinese yellow noodles, prepared 'Indian style' and fried with spices, minced meat, green peas and potatoes.
- Murtabak - Roti Prata stuffed with minced chicken, mutton, beef or sardines.
- Roti john - A split, panfried baguette topped with egg, minced mutton and onions, and served with ketchup.
- Roti Prata - 'Singapore's answer to the croissant'. A popular supper after leaving nightclubs. Variations include durian and cheese prata.
- Teh tarik - Literally 'pulled tea', named after its preparation technique. Compared to the cappuccino because of its frothy top.

Other dishes were popular during the colonial period, when Indian ingredients and other culinary influences spread with the Empire to places like Singapore. Many of them endure in some homes and restaurants. Some of these dishes include:

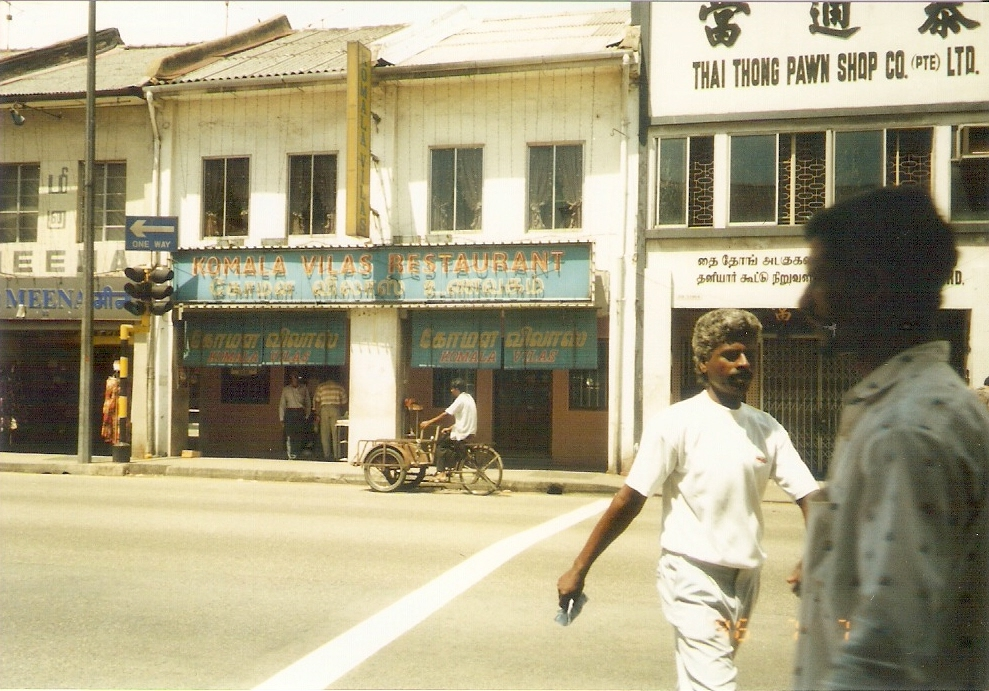
Komala Vilas South Indian restaurant in Serangoon (1996)

- Mince with potatoes and peas - a pork mince cooked with cloves and soya sauce. Similar to Goan quema and Indian kheema.
- Chicken Wrap - An Anglo-Indian chicken wrap, derived from the wraps, prepared by pepperbox.sg.
- Panneer Wrap - A North-Indian Panneer wrap, derived from the wraps, prepared by pepperbox.sg.
- Mulligatawny - An Anglo-Indian peppery curried soup, derived from the Tamil rasam.
- Fish moolie - a spicy fish and coconut dish of possible Portuguese or Indian origin.
- Curry tiffin - Another Anglo-Indian tradition, with the name derived from an Indian term for lunch. Features a curry as a main dish with various side dishes.
- Pork vindaloo - Derived from a Goan vinegared curry, which likely came to Malacca with the Portuguese in the 16th century. Now considered a Eurasian dish.
- Spiced mutton chops - Deep fried spicy mutton chops historically prepared by one Ujagar Singh at St Gregory Lane in Singapore.

There are also many other Indian foods that are less widely available foods, but which can still be found in several areas serving a more specifically Indian clientele, especially in and around Little India, Singapore. These include appam, bhatura, chutney, sambar, idli, muruku, putu mayam, samosa, tandoori, thosai, upma and various sweets, including jalebi, halva, laddu, paayasam and gulab jamun.

== See also ==
- Singaporean cuisine
