= Malaysian Indian cuisine =

Cuisine of ethnic Indian communities of Malaysia

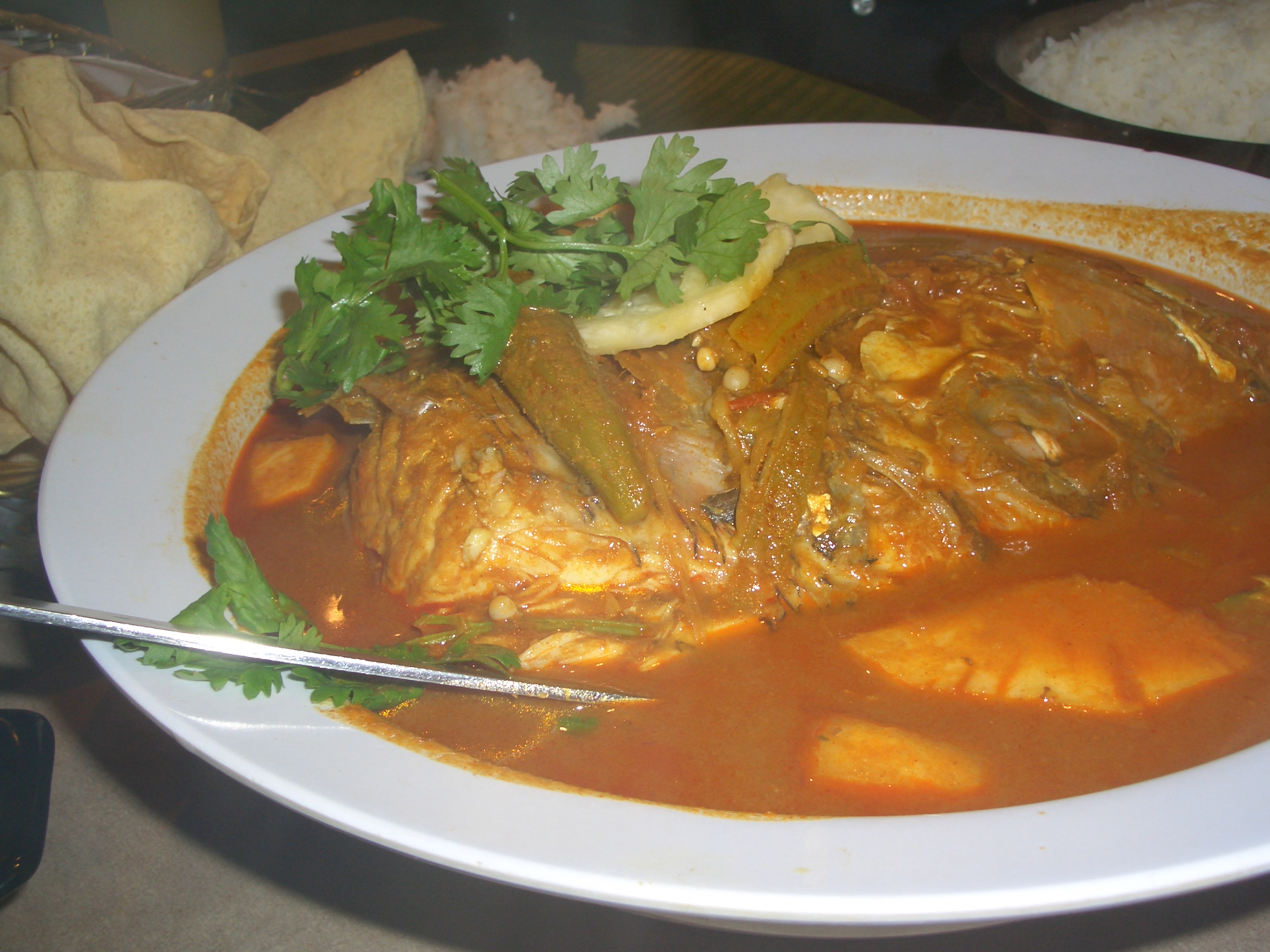
Fish head curry

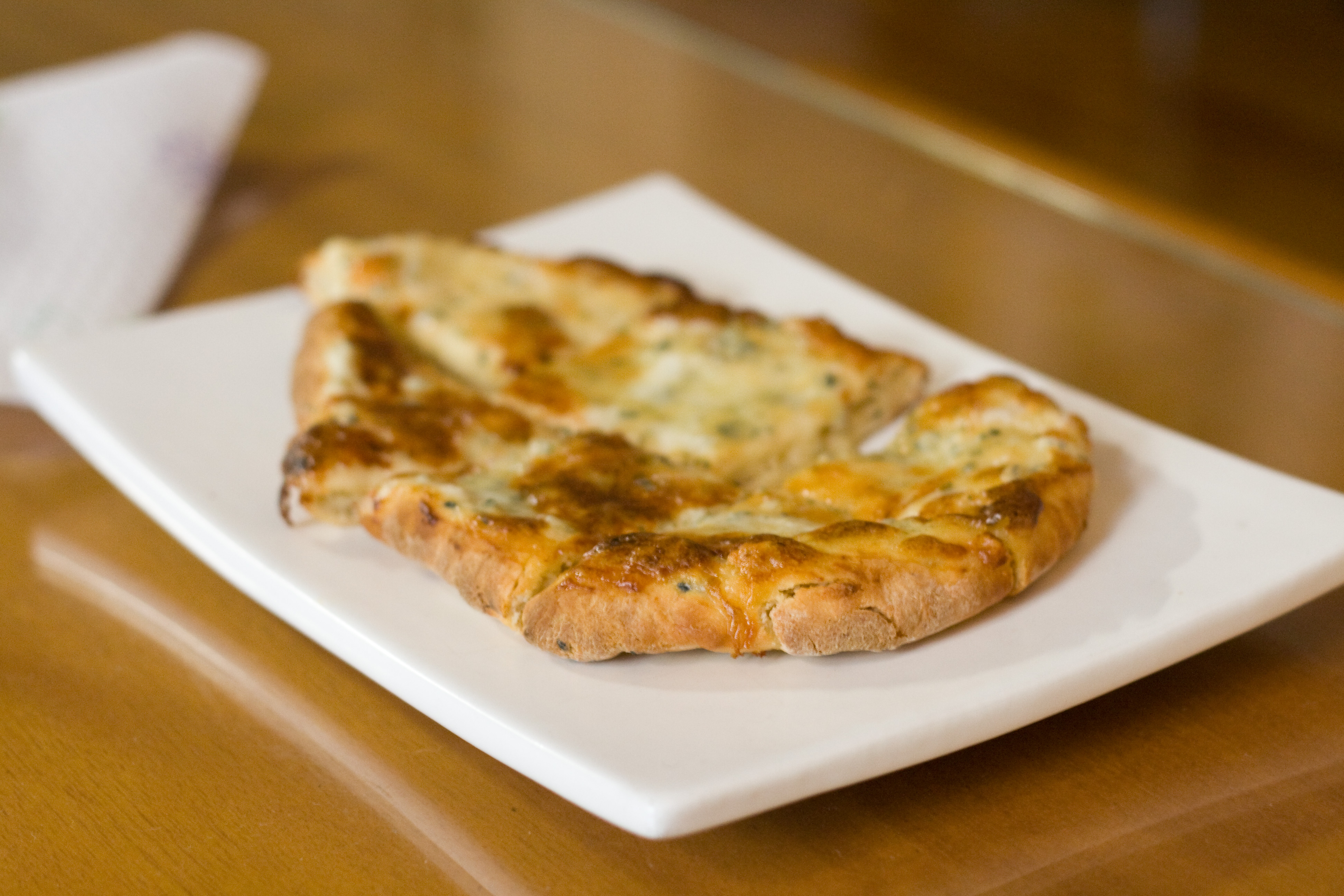
Cheese naan

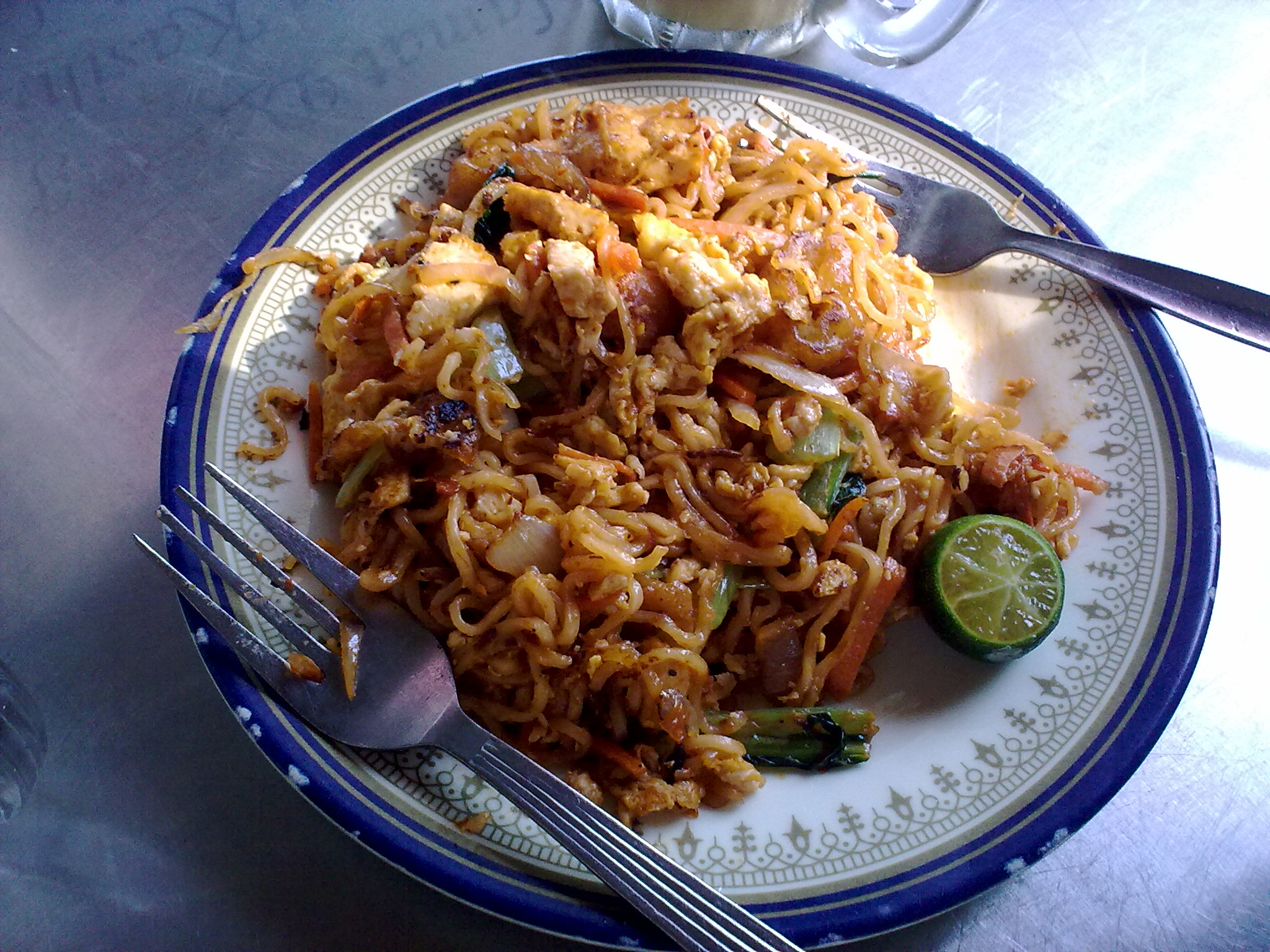
Maggi goreng

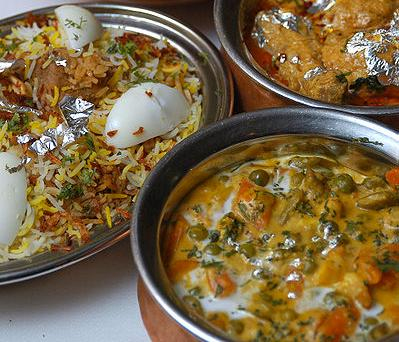
Biryani

Malaysian Indian cuisine, or the cooking of the ethnic Indian communities in Malaysia, consists of adaptations of authentic dishes from India, as well as original creations inspired by the diverse food culture of Malaysia. Because the vast majority of Malaysia's Indian community are of South Indian descent, and are mostly ethnic Tamils who are descendants of immigrants from a historical region which consists of the modern Indian state of Tamil Nadu and Sri Lanka's Northern Province, much of Malaysian Indian cuisine is predominantly South Indian-inspired in character and taste.

A typical Malaysian Indian dish is likely to be seasoned with curry leaves and whole and powdered spice, and to contain fresh coconut in various forms. Ghee is still widely used for cooking, although vegetable oils and refined palm oils are now commonplace in home kitchens. Before a meal it is customary to wash hands as cutlery is often not used while eating, with the exception of a serving spoon for each respective dish.

== History ==
Indianisation as part of Greater India as Malaysia and Southeast Asia resulted in historically influence by Indian culture, religion and cuisine.

== Cuisine culture ==
=== Banana leaf ===
As nearly 90 percent of Malaysian Indians originated from South India, banana leaf is used traditionally to eat food from. The banana leaf meal is famous in Malaysia. With rice at the center and different accompaniments like pickle, fried meat or vegetable, papadam (Indian fries made of lentils), it's a feast by itself and various curries that are served around this is not just a treat for the eyes but also to the palate. Etiquette is important when it comes to a banana leaf rice meal. One part involves the practice of serving, namely the way the leaf is placed before a diner and where the food is placed on the leaf itself. Eating with one's hands is a must.

The folding aspect of the banana leaf is also contentious with many believing it to be a rating system – fold towards one to indicate satisfaction or away to indicate dissatisfaction.

=== Chitty Cuisine ===
Chitty' or Chitty Melaka has a unique Indian-Peranakan fusion style cuisine blending of Tamil spices with Malays ingredients like belacan and lemongrass.

A well known method of cooking that used by this community is Pindang. Pindang is a cooking method in Malay language of boiling ingredients in brine or acidic solutions.

=== Chettinad cuisine ===
Chettinad cuisine, the cuisine of the Chettinad region in Tamil Nadu, is very popular and available at specialty restaurants. The traditional cookery of the Chettiar community is distinct from the predominantly vegetarian fare of Tamil cuisine as it is heavily based on robustly spiced meat preparations. Coconut milk is sparingly used in favour of liberal quantities of onions and tomatoes to flavour and thicken curries.

=== Mamak culture ===
Mamak dishes have developed a distinctly Malaysian style. Available throughout the country, the omnipresent mamak stalls or restaurants are particularly popular among the locals as they offer a wide range of food and some outlets are open 24 hours a day. A type of Indian Muslim meal served buffet-style at specialist mamak restaurant is called nasi kandar (analogous to the Indonesian nasi padang, where one pays for what one has actually eaten), white rice or biryani rice served with other dishes of curry either with chicken, fish, beef, or mutton, and usually accompanied with pickled vegetables and papadum.

== List of dishes found in Malaysian food ==
- Appam: a type of bowl-shaped pancake made with fermented rice batter and coconut milk.
- Attukal paya: Mutton leg soup. The local version is also known as sup kambing.
- Avial: a vegetable stew made from julienned or shredded vegetables sauteed in coconut oil and seasoned with spices like curry leaves, turmeric, cumin powder and green chilies. The vegetables are then simmered with coconut milk and finished off with some yoghurt.
- Banana leaf rice: White rice (or parboiled rice in authentic South Indian restaurants) is served on a banana leaf with an assortment of vegetables, curried meat or fish, pickles or papadum. To show your appreciation after a satisfying meal, fold the banana leaf towards you (i.e. inwards) to signify that the meal was good. Folding the opposite direction (i.e., upwards/away from you) signifies that the meal was not satisfying.
- Biryani or nasi beriani: a flavoured rice dish cooked or served with mutton, chicken, vegetable or fish curry. Basmati rice is used. Alternatively, dum biryani is a version more akin to the traditional South Asian dish, which is a variant that bakes the spiced meat with the rice.
- Butter chicken a famous Indian food.
- Chapati: a type of North Indian style flatbread. It is made from a dough of atta flour (whole grain durum wheat), water and salt by rolling the dough out into discs of approximately twelve centimetres in diameter and browning the discs on both sides on a very hot, dry tava or frying pan with no oil. Chapatis are usually eaten with vegetable curry dishes, and pieces of the chapati are used to wrap around and pick up each bite of the cooked dish.
- Chicken 65: a spicy, deep-fried chicken dish originating from Tamil Nadu. The flavour of the dish comes from ginger, cayenne pepper, mustard powder and vinegar although the exact recipe can vary. It can be prepared using chicken on or off the bone. Curry leaves play an important role in the flavour.
- Chicken kali mirchi: a chicken dish cooked in a sauce predominantly flavoured with coarsely ground black pepper which is also popular in Pakistan. (kali mirch in Hindi).
- Chutney: the term chutney refers to a family of condiments mainly associated with South Asian cuisine that usually contain some mixture of spices, vegetables or fruits. Chutneys may be either wet or dry, and can have a coarse to a fine texture.
- Dal makhani: Punjabi-style lentil stew made with whole urad dhal, butter and cream.
- Fish head curry: a dish with some Chinese and Malay influences. The head of a red snapper (ikan merah; literally "red fish") is stewed in curry consisting of varying amounts of coconut milk and tamarind juice with vegetables (lady's fingers and brinjal are common). Usually served with either rice or bread.
- Fish molee: originally from the state of Kerala, this preparation of fish cooked in spiced coconut gravy is perhaps the Malaysian Malayalee community's best known dish.
- Fish puttu: a traditional dish from Kerala, fish puttu is pan-fried shredded fish mixed with grated coconut and spices.
- Kurma: kurma in Malaysia is usually made with chicken or mutton braised with a medley of ground spices, nuts, and coconut milk or grated coconut. The spice blend for kurma is widely found pre-mixed and marketed commercially as "kurma powder".
- Koottu: a chunky semi-solid gravy made from lentils and vegetables.
- Idli: made from lentils (specifically black lentils) and rice — into patties, usually two to three inches in diameter, using a mould and steamed. Most often eaten at breakfast or as a snack, idli are usually served in pairs with chutney, sambar, or other accompaniments.
- Mamak Rojak: a salad consisting of cucumber (shredded), potatoes, beancurd, turnip, bean sprouts, prawn fritters, spicy fried crab, fried octopus or other seafoods and served with a sweet and spicy nut sauce. The term Pasembur is a variant of Mamak Rojak found in Northern Peninsular Malaysia. It is especially associated with Penang where Pasembur can be had along Gurney Drive.
- 'Roti jala, popular in Malaysia, Indonesia and Singapore, is inspired from Appam and traveled there from India likely in the 15th century.
- Mee goreng: It is made with thin yellow noodles fried with garlic, onion or shallots, fried prawn, chicken, chili, tofu, vegetables, tomatoes, egg.
  - Maggi goreng: a variant of mee goreng using Maggi instant noodles.
  - Mee goreng mamak: a variant that is found at Mamak stalls and is known to use spices, tomato sauce, potatoes and sweet soy sauce.
- Mee rebus: A dish using egg noodles in a sweet and spicy sauce, green chillies with a hard boiled egg.
- Meen Varuthathu: Kerala-style marinated fried fish.
- Murtabak: a dish of savoury stuffed roti, usually including minced mutton, garlic, onion, and folded with an omelette, and is eaten with curry sauce.
- Naan: a leavened, oven-baked flatbread. It is usually eaten with an array of sauces such as Chutney and curries such as Dhal curry. Some examples of Naan bread include Garlic Naan, Butter Naan, Garlic Butter Naan, Cheese Naan, Garlic Cheese Naan.
- Nasi lemak: the Malaysian Indian version is similar to the original version. However, many Malaysian Indians are Hindus, and do not eat beef. Therefore, beef is usually not included while preparing the Malaysian Indian version of nasi lemak. There also vegetarian nasi lemak in which the dried anchovies is substituted with vegetarian mock anchovie
- Nasi Kandar: a meal of steamed rice which can be plain or mildly flavoured, and served with a variety of curries and side dishes.
- Oorugai: also known as Indian pickles, Oorugai are made from certain individual varieties of vegetables and fruits that are chopped into small pieces and cooked in edible oils like sesame oil or brine with many different spices.
- Paneer: a type of cheese made with citrus juice as the coagulation agent instead of rennet, which makes it compatible with lacto-vegetarian diets. Paneer is not a common ingredient in most Malaysian Indian cooking, and is mainly used in North Indian inspired recipes. Examples of dishes made with paneer include paneer Tikka, paneer butter masala and palak paneer.
- Parattal or Peratal: a traditional South Indian dry curry cooked with meat or vegetables.
- Pongal: a boiled rice dish which comes in sweet and spicy varieties. It shares the same name as the harvest festival which is celebrated every January; the name of the festival itself is derived from this dish. The sweet variety of pongal, prepared with milk and jaggery, is cooked in the morning. Once the pongal pot has boiled over (symbolism for an abundant harvest), it is then offered as a prasad to the gods as thanksgiving.
- Poriyal: the Tamil term for a fried or sauteed dish and is usually vegetarian. The preparation would normally involve tempering mustard seeds, urad dal, onions and then the main vegetable, seasoned with dried red chillis and spices like turmeric and coriander, and finished off with shredded coconut.
- Poori: an unleavened bread customarily served with halwa, kurma, chana masala, dal, and potato based curries (e.g.: saagu, bhaji, bhujia).
- Puttu - a speciality of the Ceylonese or Jaffna Tamil community, puttu is a steamed cylinder of ground rice layered with coconut. It is eaten with bananas, brown sugar, and side dishes like vendhaya kolumbu (tamarind stew flavoured with fenugreek seeds and lentils) or kuttu sambal (relish made from pounded coconut, onions, chilli and spices).
- Putu mayam (string hoppers / idiyappam) is a sweet dish of rice noodles with coconut and jaggery as main ingredients. It is served with grated coconut and jaggery, or, unrefined block sugar. In some areas, gula melaka (coconut palm sugar) is the favourite sweetener. Putu piring is a version of putu mayam in which the rice flour dough is used to form a small cake around a filling of coconut and brown sugar. The homemade version in Malaysian Indian homes tend to be eaten as a savoury accompaniment to curried dishes or dal.
- Ratha Poriyal: Lamb Blood Fry, a dish prepared with goat's blood. Hard to found in local restaurant as it were served and cooked as home food.
- Rasam: a type of lentil soup flavoured with pepper, coriander and cumin seeds.
- Roti canai: Roti Canai is a type of Indian-influenced flatbread popular in Malaysia and Singapore, similar to Kerala porotta. In Tamil it known as Parotta.
  - Roti tissue: sometimes known as Roti Helikopter (Helicopter bread). Roti Tissue is a much thinner version of traditional Roti canai, almost as thin as a piece of 40–50 cm round-shaped tissue.
- Sambar: a thick stew of lentils with vegetables and seasoned with spices.
- Satti Sorru:Indian claypot rice
- Seafood curry, different from its Indian counterpart as yogurt is not used in making this curry.
- Tandoori chicken: chicken marinated in a mixture of spices and yoghurt and cooked in a clay oven.
- Thosai: rice and lentil pancake. Also served as a "masala" version that includes spiced potatoes and served with different types of sambar, wrapped with thosai which is fried to a crispier texture then the typical homestyle version.
- Upma or uppuma: a South Indian style thick porridge cooked from dry roasted semolina.
- Uttapam: a savoury pancake prepared from a similar batter used to make thosai. Toppings cooked right into the batter may include tomatoes, onion, chillies, capsicum, cabbage and even grated paneer.
- Vada: a small spicy fritter, often formed into a donut-like shape, made from mashed lentils and spices.
- Varuval: a dry preparation of pre-cooked meat or vegetables sauteed in oil with whole and ground spices. Chettinad-style varuval favour the use of meat like chicken or mutton cooked with liberal spicing.
- Vindalho: an Indian inspired pork dish often found in Kristang households in Malaysia, owing to the community's historical ties with the Indian state of Goa, a former Portuguese colony.

== Desserts and sweets ==
- Adhirasam: a type of Indian sweet from Tamil cuisine
- Ais kacang: traditionally a special ice machine is used to churn out the shaved ice used in the dessert, originally hand cranked but now more often motorised.
- Cendol: smooth green rice noodles in chilled coconut milk and gula melaka (coconut palm sugar).
- Gulab jamun: a dessert often eaten at festivals or major celebrations such as marriages and Deepavali
- Halwa: a type of dense, sweet fudge-like confection, often flavoured with nuts and spices.
- Jalebi: a deep fried sweet made from wheat flour batter shaped into pretzel or circular shapes, which are then soaked in syrup.
- Payasam: an integral part of traditional South Indian culture.
- Modak: rice flour dumplings stuffed with coconut and gula melaka.
- Laddu: ball-shaped sweets popularly served during festive or religious occasions.
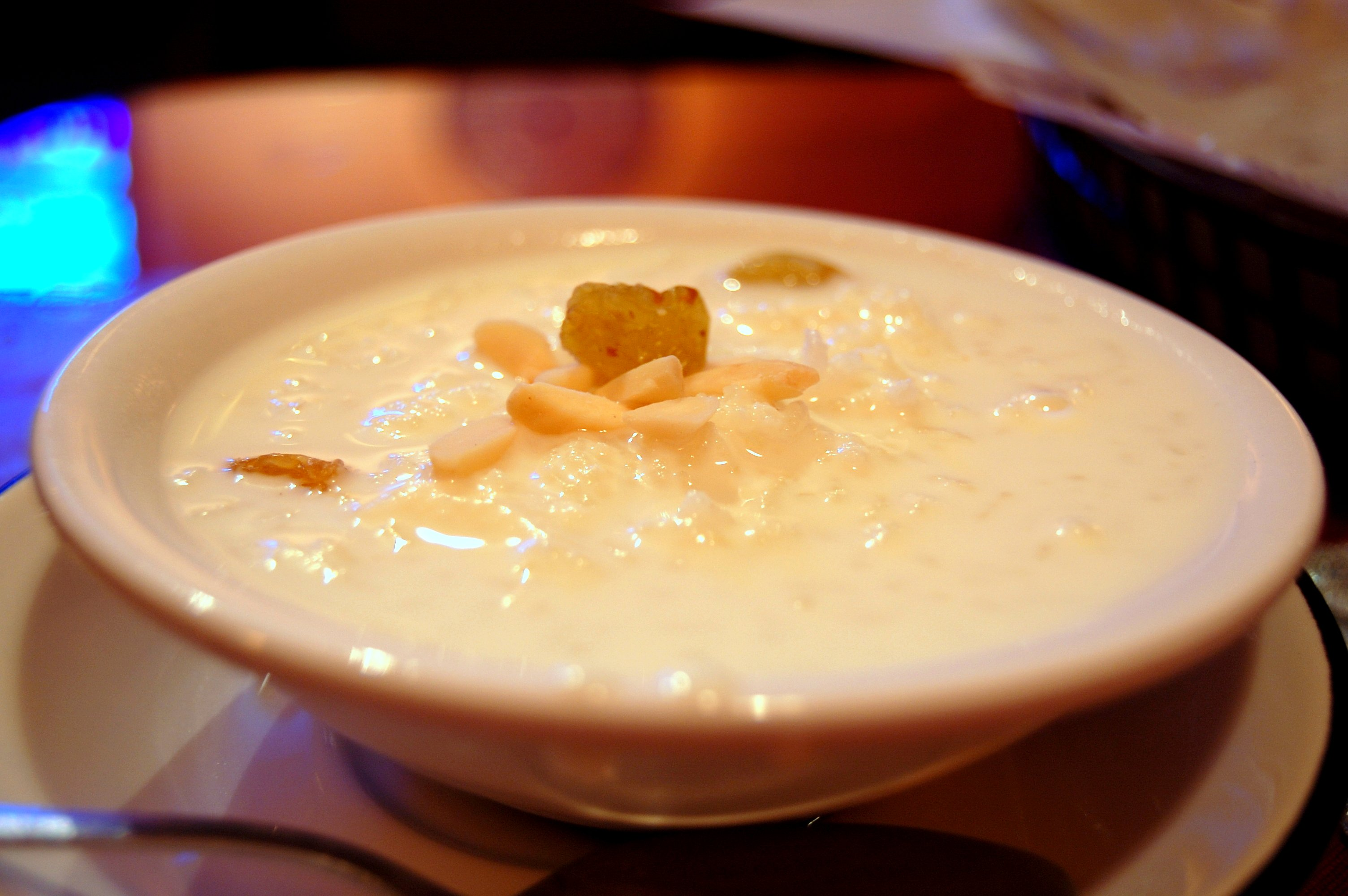
Payasam

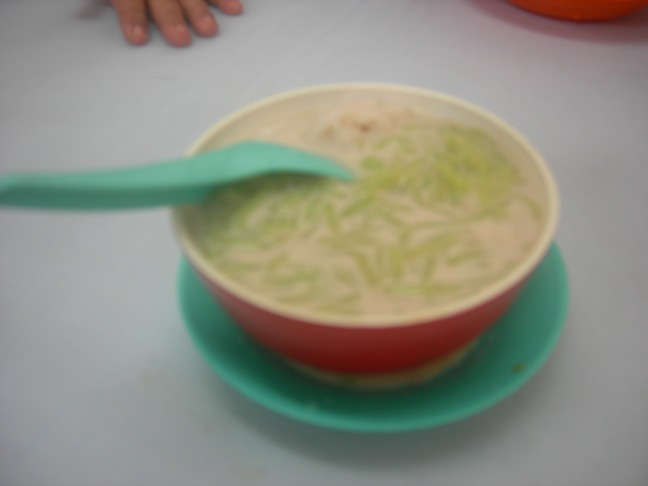
Cendol

== Drinks and beverages ==
- Moru: Buttermilk, made thin with water called 'Neer Moru'. sometimes seasoned with mustard seeds, curry leaves, small onions, called 'Thalicha moru'.
- Badam milk: milk, flavoured and thickened with crushed almonds.
- Filter coffee: sweet milky coffee made from dark roasted coffee beans (70%-80%) and chicory (20%-30%).
- Lassi: Lassi is a cold yoghurt drink served in a tall glass with a straw. It comes in two varieties: salted or sweet.
- Masala chai: a beverage made by brewing tea with a mixture of aromatic Indian spices and herbs.
- Teh tarik: literally meaning "pulled tea", teh tarik is a well-loved Malaysian drink. Tea is sweetened using condensed milk, and is prepared using outstretched hands to pour piping hot tea from a mug into a waiting glass, repetitively. The higher the "tarik" or pull, the thicker the froth. The "pulling" of tea also has the effect of cooling down the tea. Teh tarik is an art form in itself and watching the tea streaming back and forth into the containers can be quite captivating. Similar drinks and variants include kopi tarik, or "pulled coffee" instead of tea; teh halia, tea brewed with ginger, and with or without the tarik treatment; and teh madras, which is prepared with three separate layers: milk at the bottom, black tea in the middle and foam at the top.

== Snacks ==
There is a large variety of bite-sized savoury snacks popular not only with the Indian community, but the wider Malaysian population as well. Street vendors selling kacang putih, a collective term for snacks made of flour, nuts or legumes and many types of spices roasted or fried to golden yellow are still a common sight.

- Achu murukku: Also known as rose cookies; an Anglo-Indian cookie eaten at festive times like Diwali and Christmas.
- Banana chips: deep-fried or dried slices of bananas (fruits of herbaceous plants of the genus Musa of the soft, sweet "dessert banana" variety). They can be covered with sugar or honey and have a sweet taste, or they can be fried in oil and spices and have a salty or spicy taste
- Bombay mix: Indian snack mix which consists of a variable mixture of spicy dried ingredients, such as fried lentils, peanuts, chickpea flour ghatia (sev), corn, vegetable oil, chickpeas, flaked rice, fried onion and curry leaves.
- Bonda: a typical South Indian snack that has various sweet and spicy versions in different regions.
- Murukku: a savoury snack consisting of a deep-fried spiral of legume-based batter. Murukku is typically made from a mixture of urad and rice flour, salt, and flavourings such as chili, asafoetida, ajwain, and other spices. Murukku is traditionally enjoyed as a treat on Deepavali.
- Pakora: a spicy Indian snack that consists of a core food (like soaked potato or fried onions), similar to potato fritters, with several variants. It is usually used as a topping on various Indian meals but has become popular to eat alone as a snack.
- Papadum: a thin, crisp disc-shaped cracker typically based on a seasoned dough made from black gram (urad flour), fried or cooked with dry heat. Flours made from other sources such as lentils, chickpeas, rice, or potato, can be used. Papadams are typically served as an accompaniment to a meal, or eaten on its own as a snack.
- Kacang Kuda Rebus: Chickpeas tossed in curry leaves, chillies and mustard seeds.Known as Sundal in Tamil
- Kerepek Ubi Kayu
- Samosa, is a fried or baked pastry with a savoury filling, such as spiced potatoes, onions, peas, lentils, macaroni, noodles or minced meat
