= Kamameshi =

One-pot Japanese rice dish

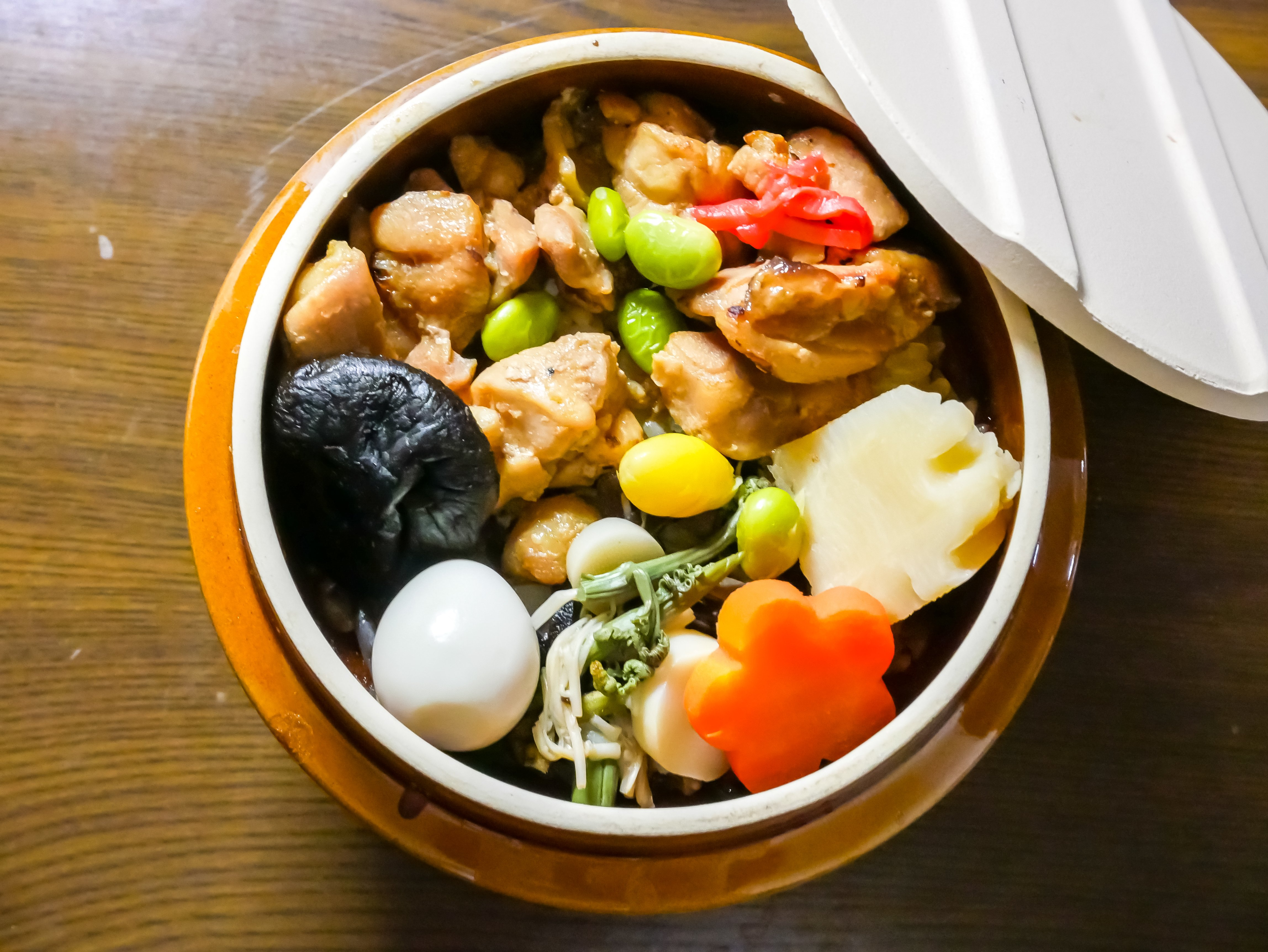
- Kamameshi with chicken
- Type: Takikomi gohan
- Course: Main
- Place of origin: Japan
- Associated cuisine: Japanese cuisine
- Serving temperature: Hot
- Main ingredients: Japonica rice
- Similar dishes: guō fàn, claypot rice, dolsot bibimbap

Kamameshi (釜飯 "kettle rice") is a Japanese rice dish traditionally cooked in an iron pot called a kama. Many varieties exist, but most consist of rice seasoned with soy sauce or mirin, and cooked with meats and vegetables. In modern times, it is often considered a type of takikomi gohan (mixed rice dish).

== History ==
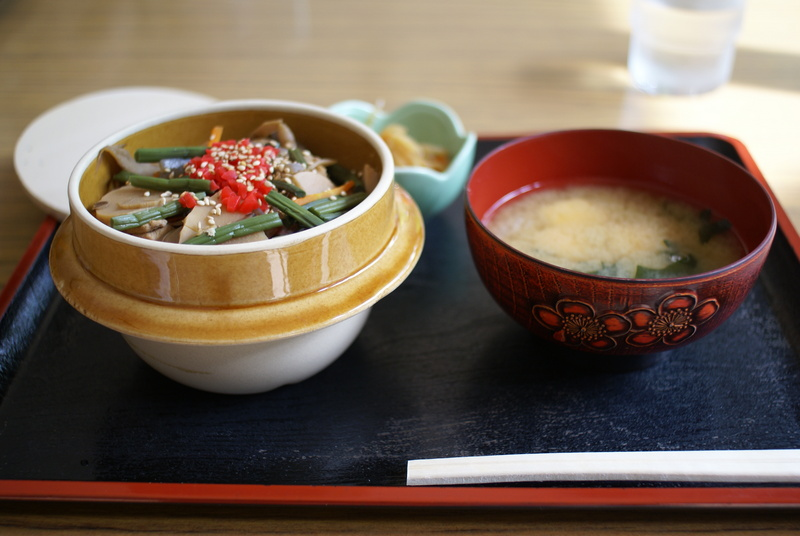
Kamameshi and miso soup

Kamameshi originally referred to rice that was eaten communally from the kama. Coworkers or family members either ate directly from the kama pot or by transferring the rice to individual bowls. The term emerged in the late Meiji period, and is associated with the communal eating of rice in the aftermath of the 1923 Great Kantō earthquake.

Later, similar to takikomi gohan, kamameshi came to refer to a type of Japanese pilaf cooked with various types of meat, seafood, and vegetables and flavored with soy sauce, sake, or mirin. By cooking the rice and various ingredients in an iron pot, the rice gets slightly burned at the bottom which adds a desirable flavor to the rice. Kama designed specifically to prepare kamameshi appeared on the market as the dish became popular across Japan, and the prepared kamameshi is placed directly on the table in its pot for the meal.

== Ekiben ==
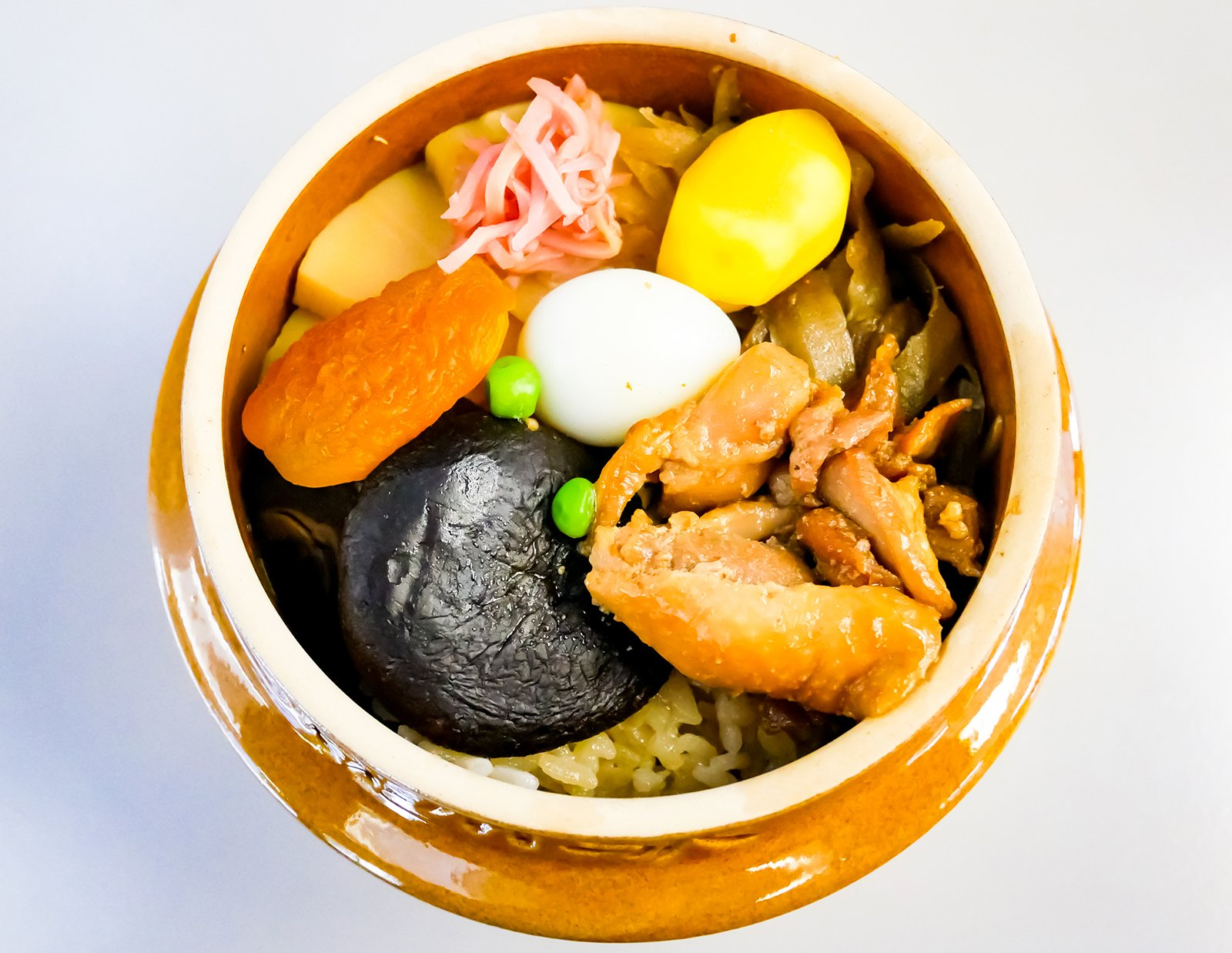
Tōge no kamameshi, a special one-person kamameshi

Kamameshi is sometimes served in ekiben, or bento boxes purchased at train stations. A small-scale replica of the kama is used to create an individual serving of kamameshi. A well known example is tōge no kamameshi, sold at Karuizawa Station in Nagano Prefecture, using a Mashiko ware kettle.

== Similar dishes ==
Many East Asian cuisines also prepare rice in a similar way using a clay pot or stone bowl. In China it is known as guō fàn (鍋飯) or, in Cantonese bo zai fan (煲仔飯), and in Korea dolsot bibimbap (돌솥 비빔밥)

== Gallery ==
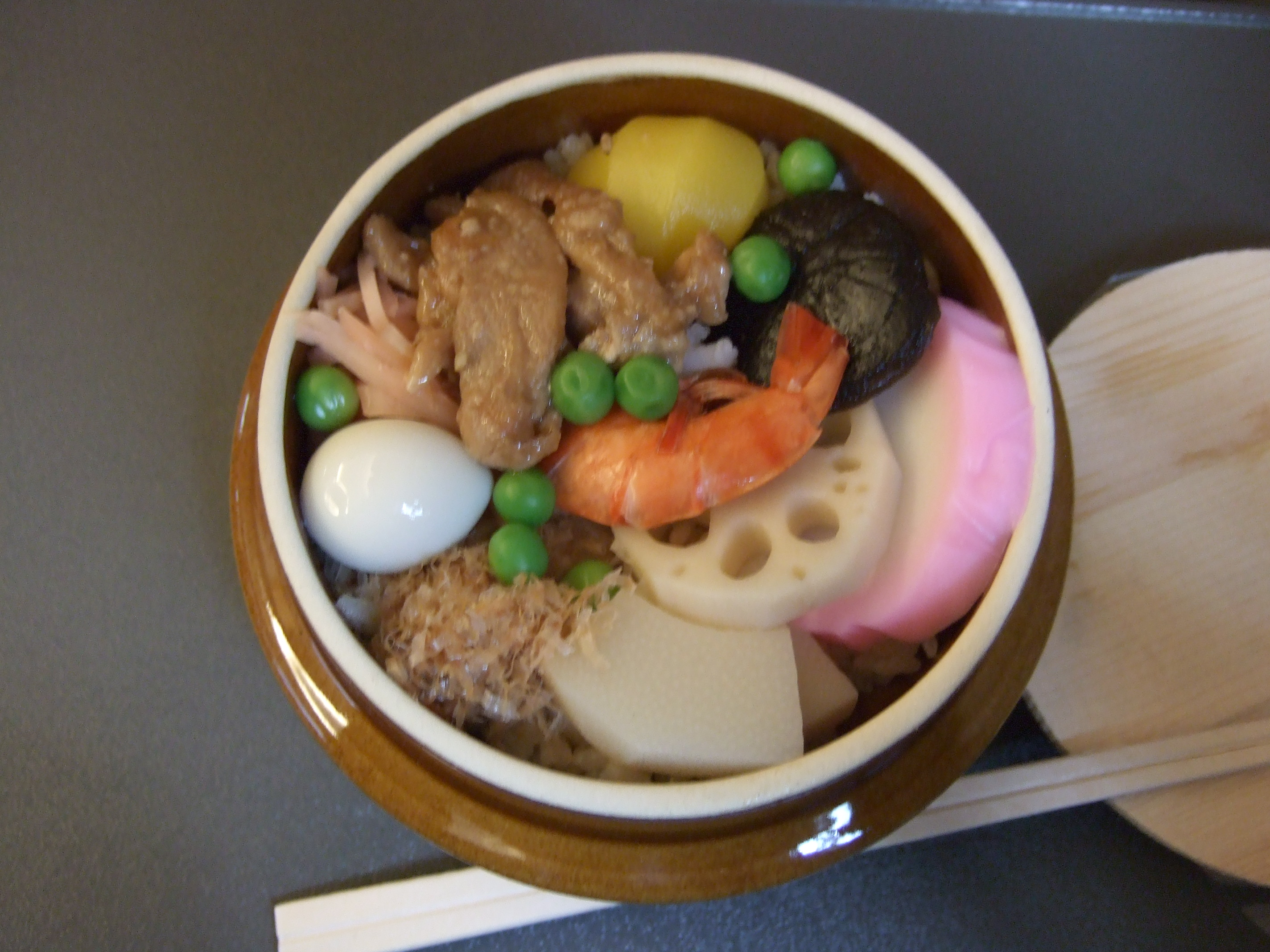

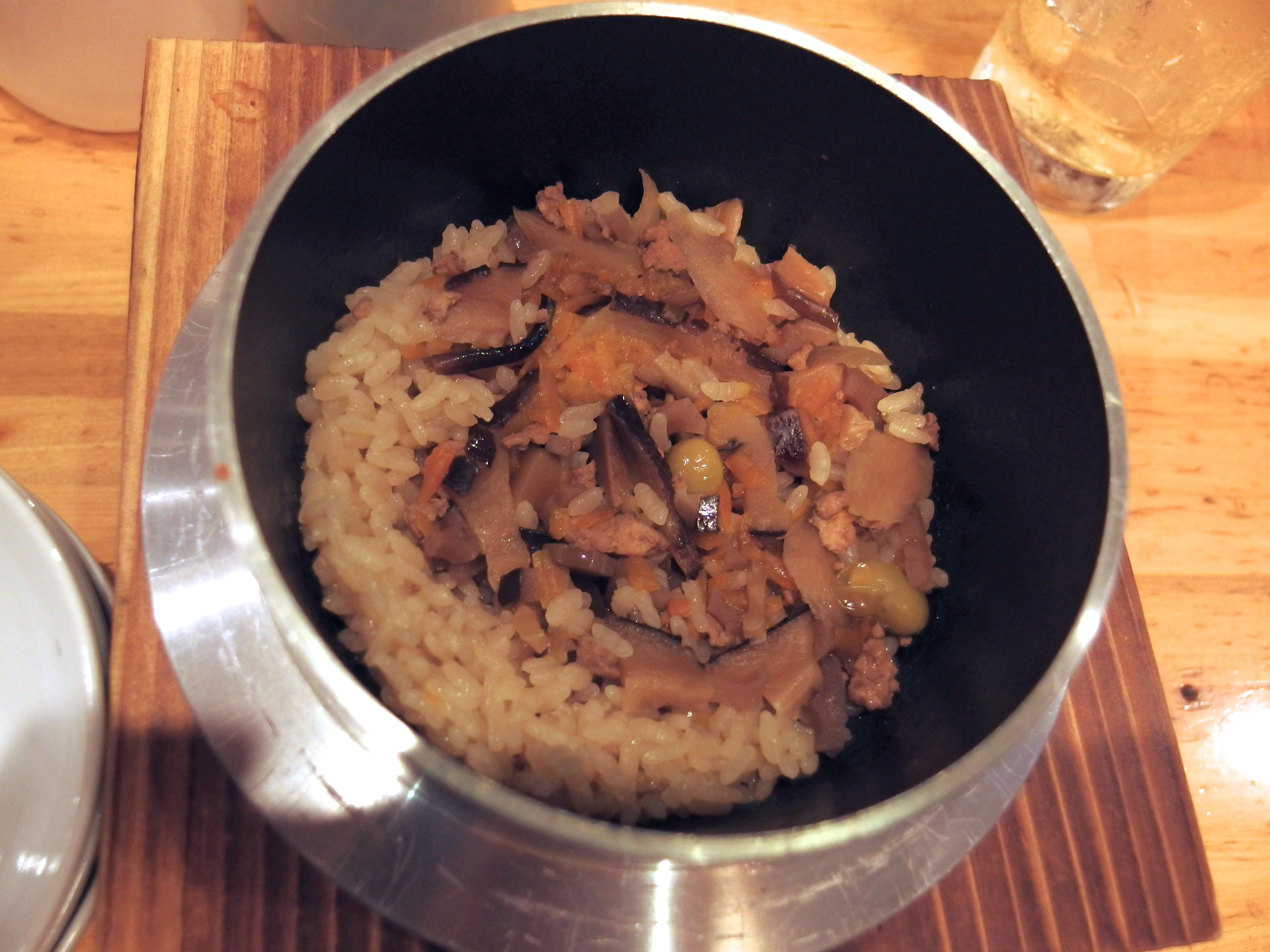

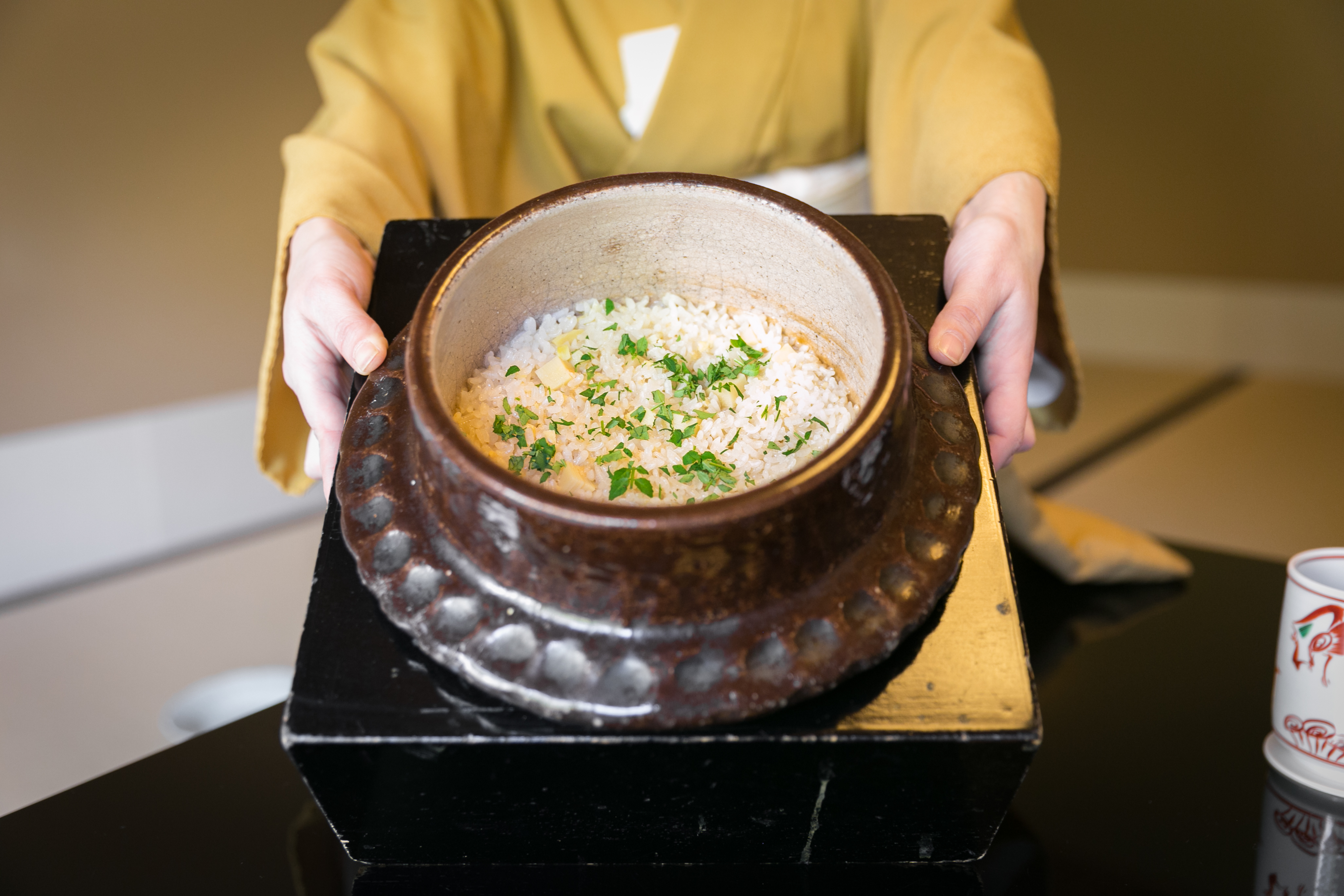

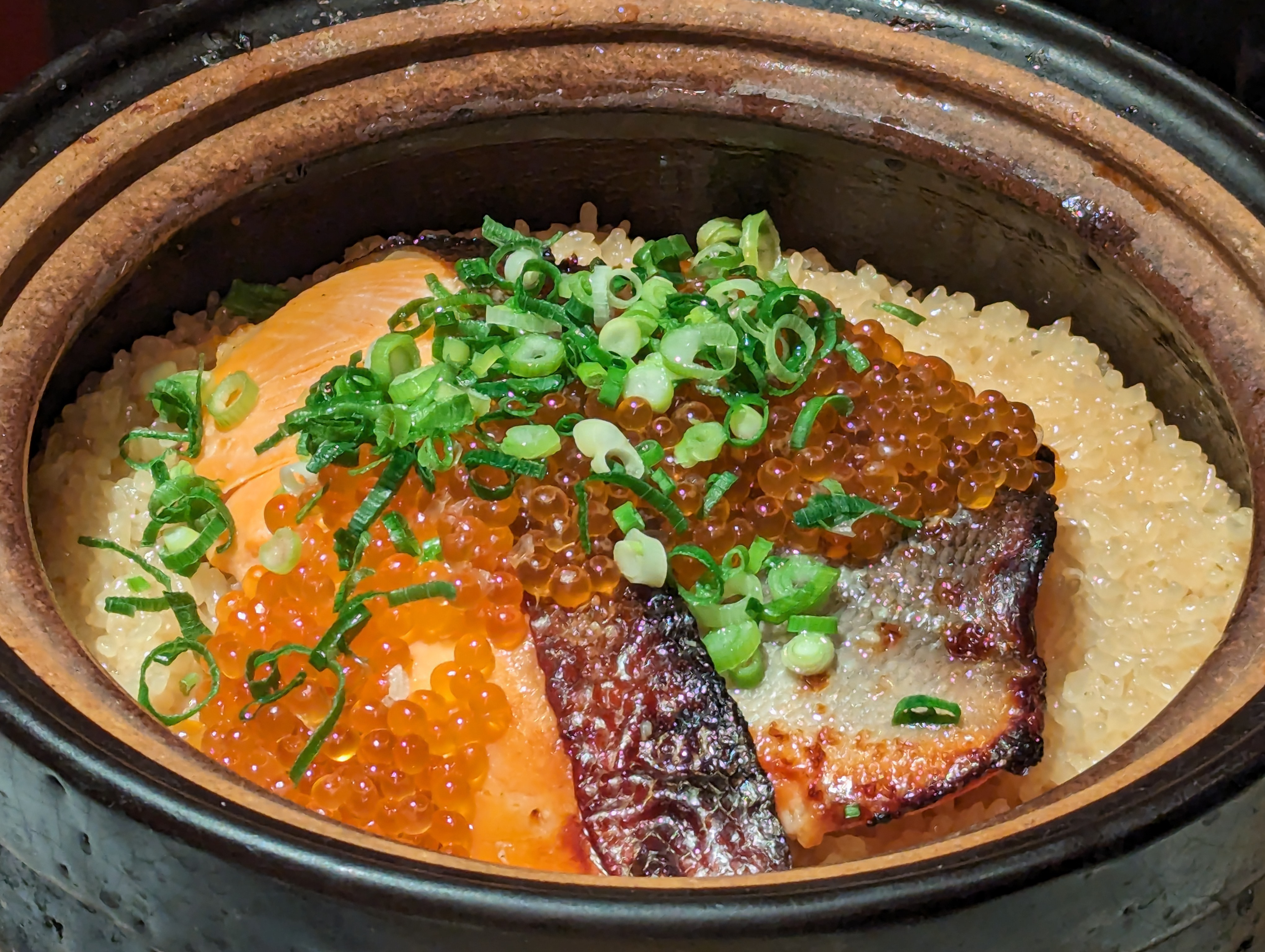

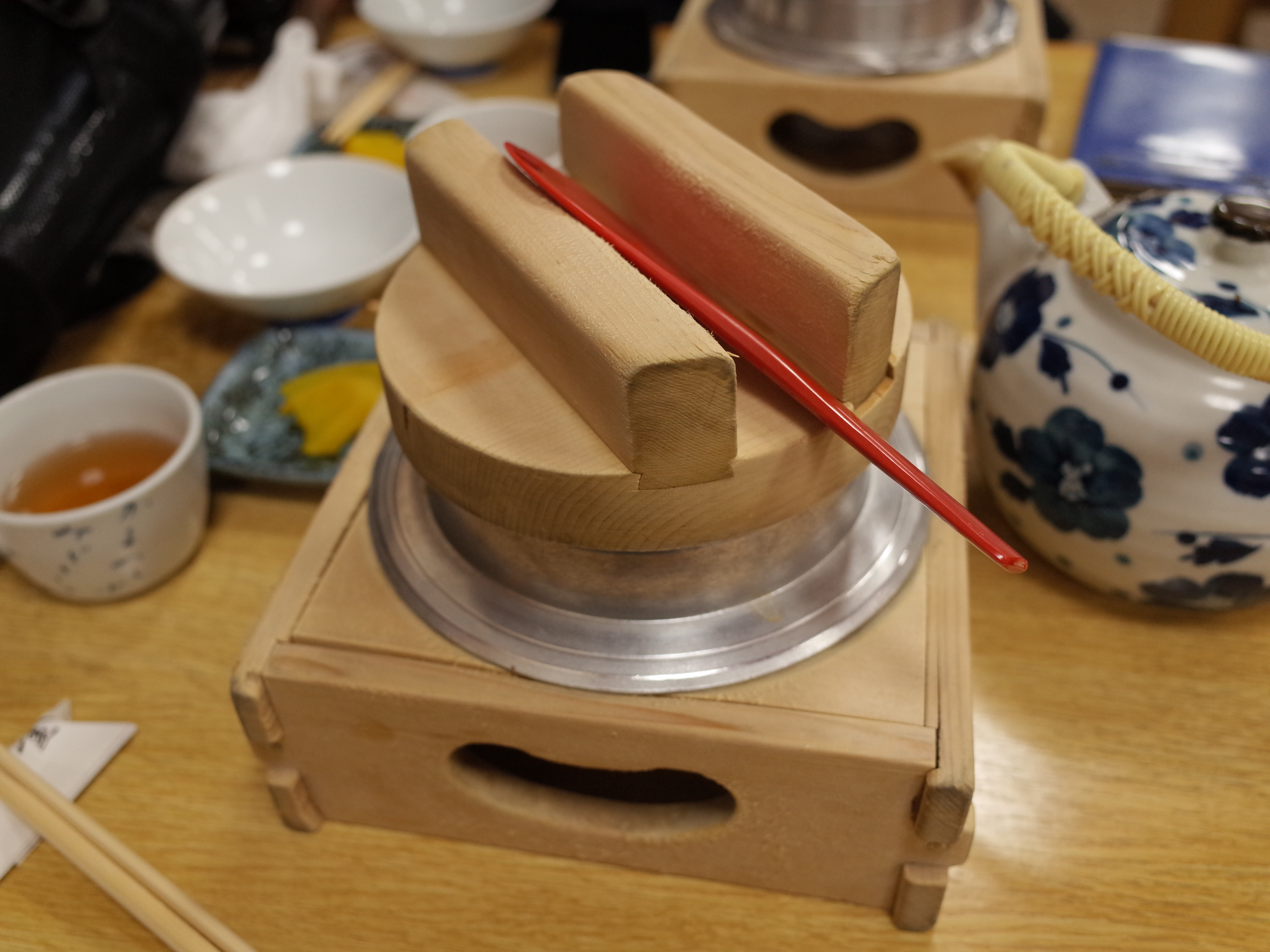
Kamameshi cooking in the kama
