= Takikomi gohan =

Japanese rice dish

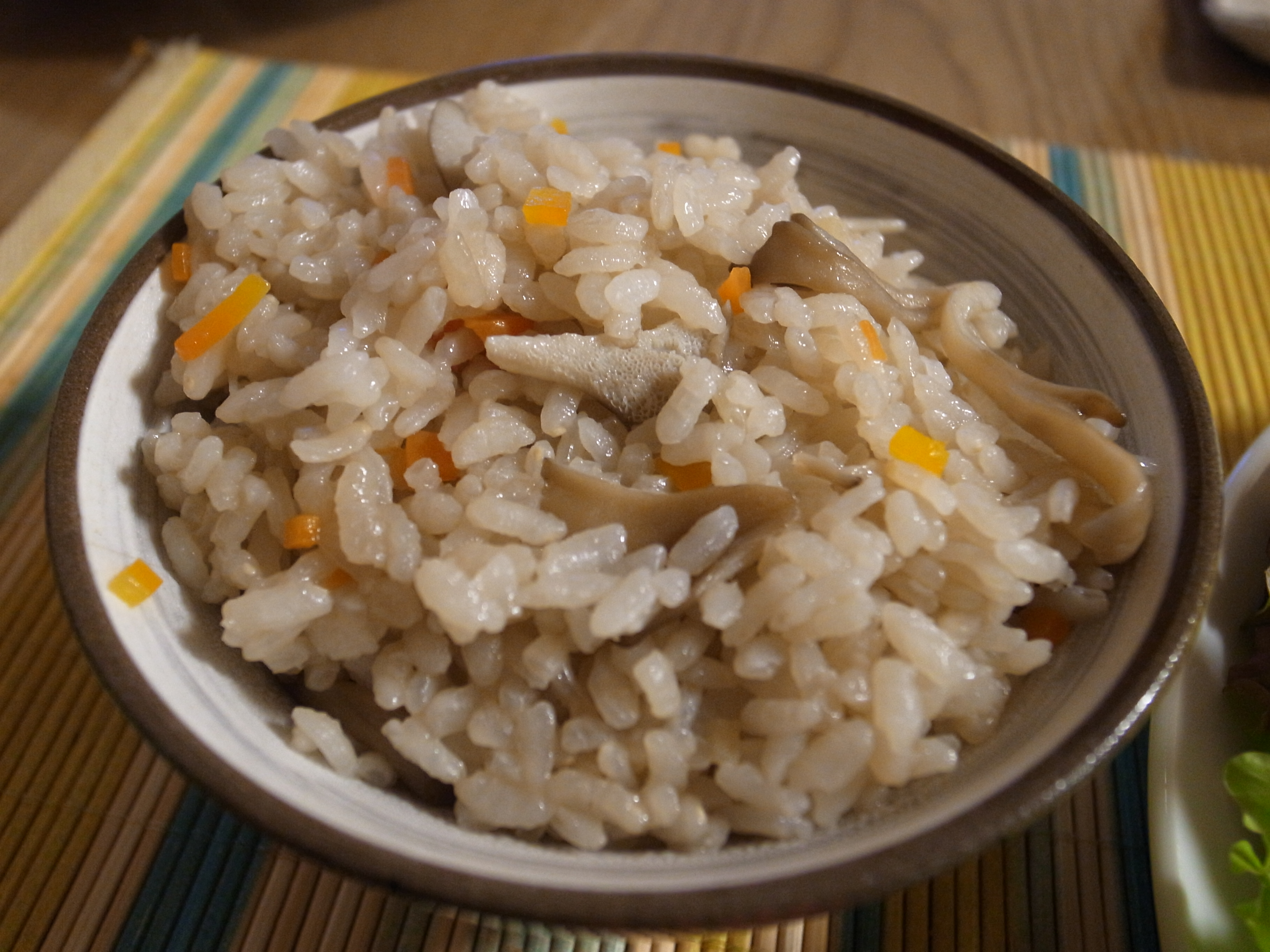
- Takikomi gohan with maitake mushrooms
- Course: Main
- Place of origin: Japan
- Associated cuisine: Japanese cuisine
- Serving temperature: Hot
- Main ingredients: Japonica rice, mushrooms, vegetables, meat, seafood

Takikomi gohan (炊き込みご飯) is a Japanese rice dish seasoned with dashi and soy sauce and mixed with mushrooms, vegetables, meat, or fish. The ingredients are cooked together with the rice. The dish is consumed by people in Japan around the fall season since many root vegetables and mushrooms are harvested during this season in Japan. Ingredients will vary based on the seasonal vegetables and fish.

== History ==
Takikomi gohan was created during the Nara period. Rice was scarce then, so people conserved rice by adding millet or other cereals, wild vegetables, yam or Japanese radish, creating an early form of takikomi gohan called katemeshi (糅飯). During the Muromachi period, katemeshi became popular, turned into a dish called kawarimeshi (変わり飯) using ingredients such as barley, beans, and vegetables. Over time, people became creative and made a variety of dishes with seasonal ingredients.

== Difference from maze gohan ==
Takikomi gohan is prepared by adding the ingredients, broth and seasonings to raw rice and cooking them together. In contrast, maze gohan (混ぜご飯; 'mixed rice') is prepared by first cooking rice alone, then mixing the ingredients into it.

== Variations ==
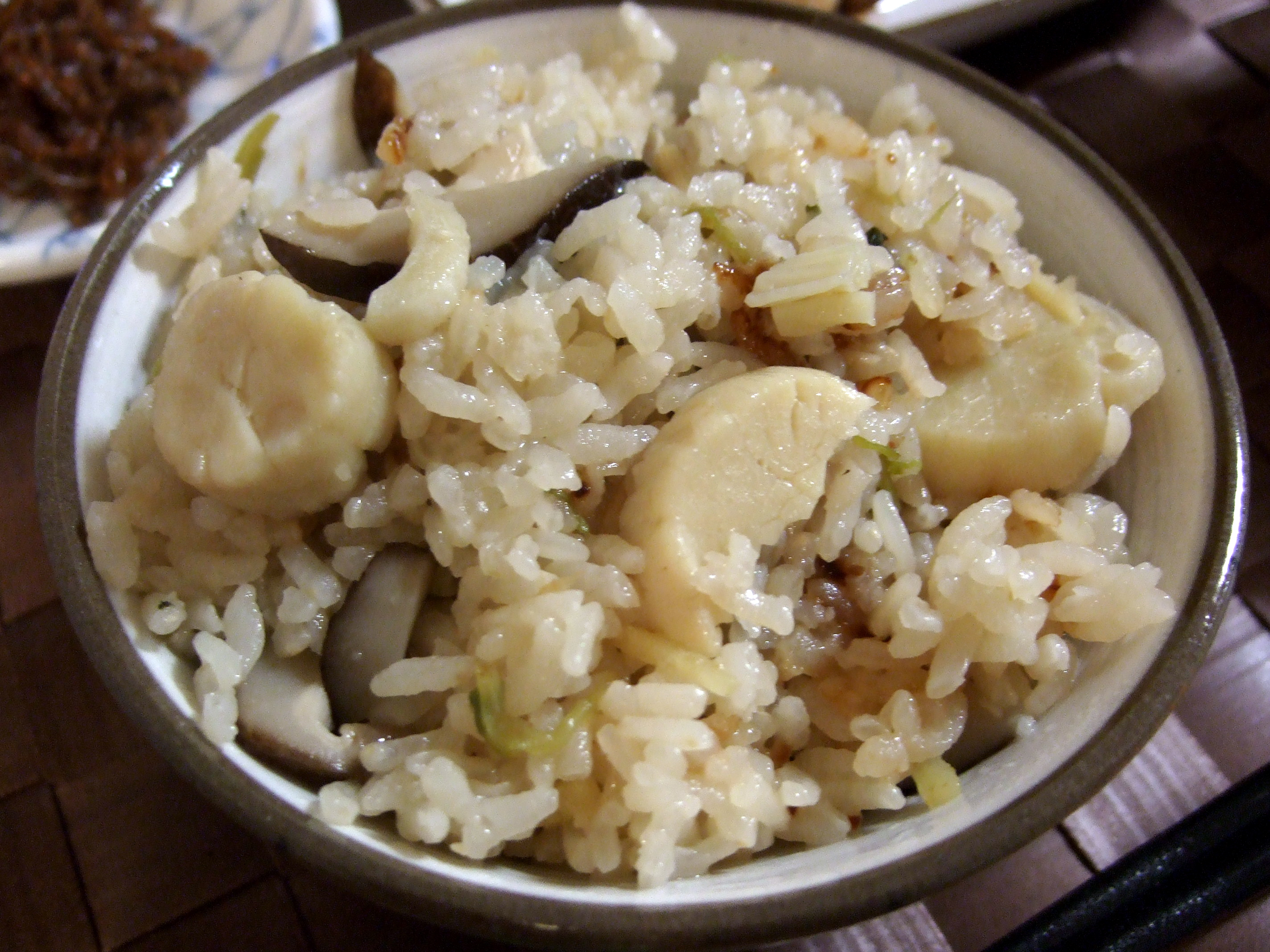
Takikomi gohan with scallops and mushrooms

- Takenoko gohan (筍御飯): Rice with bamboo shoots
- Tai-meshi (鯛飯): Rice with whole sea bream.
- Ayu-meshi (鮎飯): Rice with whole sweetfish.
- Matsutake gohan (松茸御飯): Rice with matsutake mushrooms.
- Kani-meshi (蟹飯): Rice with crab.
- Gomoku meshi (五目飯; 'five ingredients rice') or gomoku gohan (五目御飯): Combination of ingredients such as shiitake mushrooms, bamboo shoots, burdock root, carrots, konnyaku, chicken, or white-fleshed fish. In the Osaka dialect, this dish is called kayaku gohan (加薬御飯).
- Kamameshi: Takikomi gohan cooked and served in a single-serving pot.
- Kuri gohan (栗ご飯): Rice with chestnuts.
- KFC rice: Rice with fried chicken.

== Related dishes ==
=== Ryukyu Islands ===
Kufa jūshī (Okinawan: クファジューシー, rice with pork) is a type of Takikomi gohan in Okinawan cuisine.

== Gallery ==
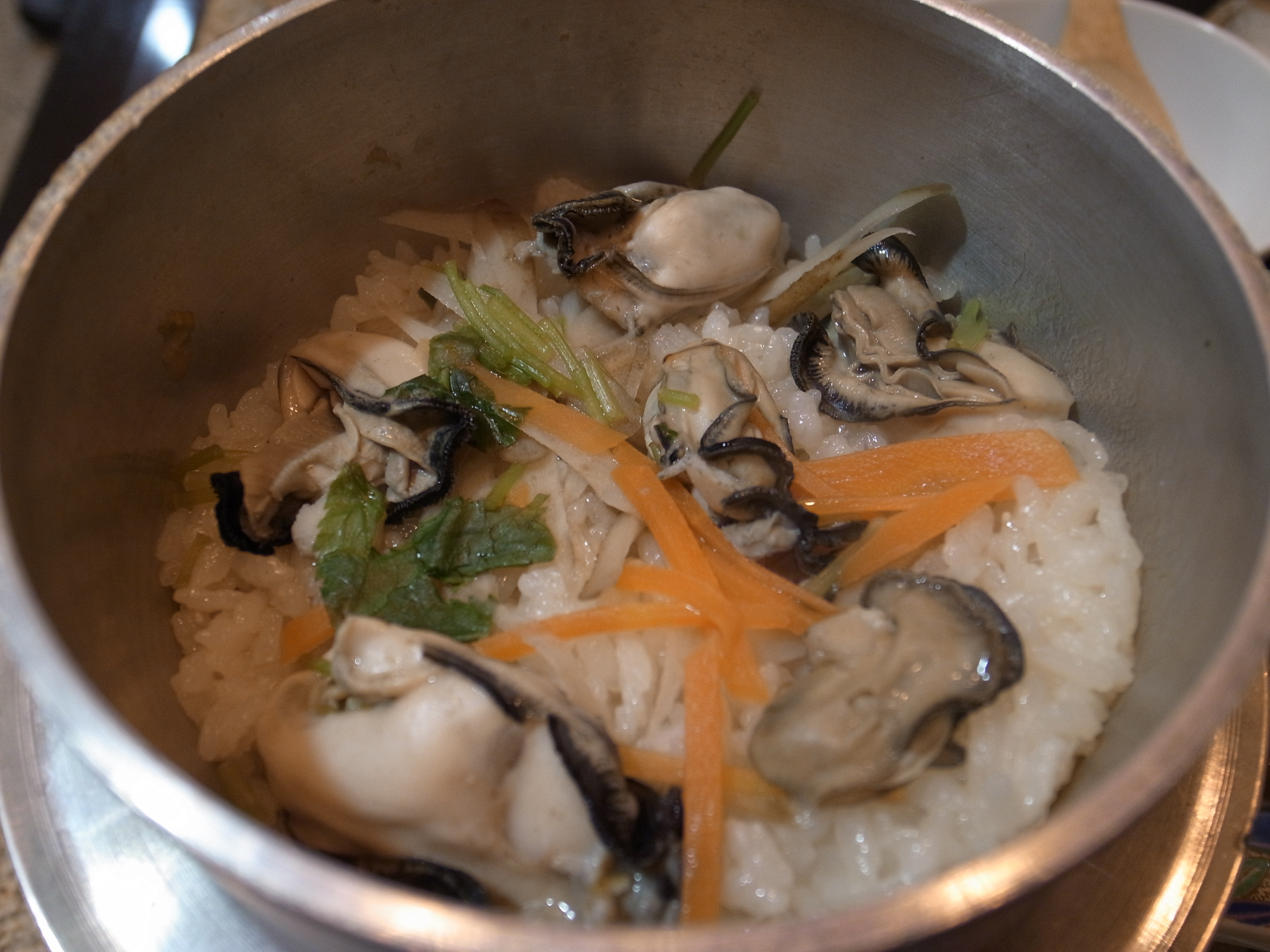
With oysters

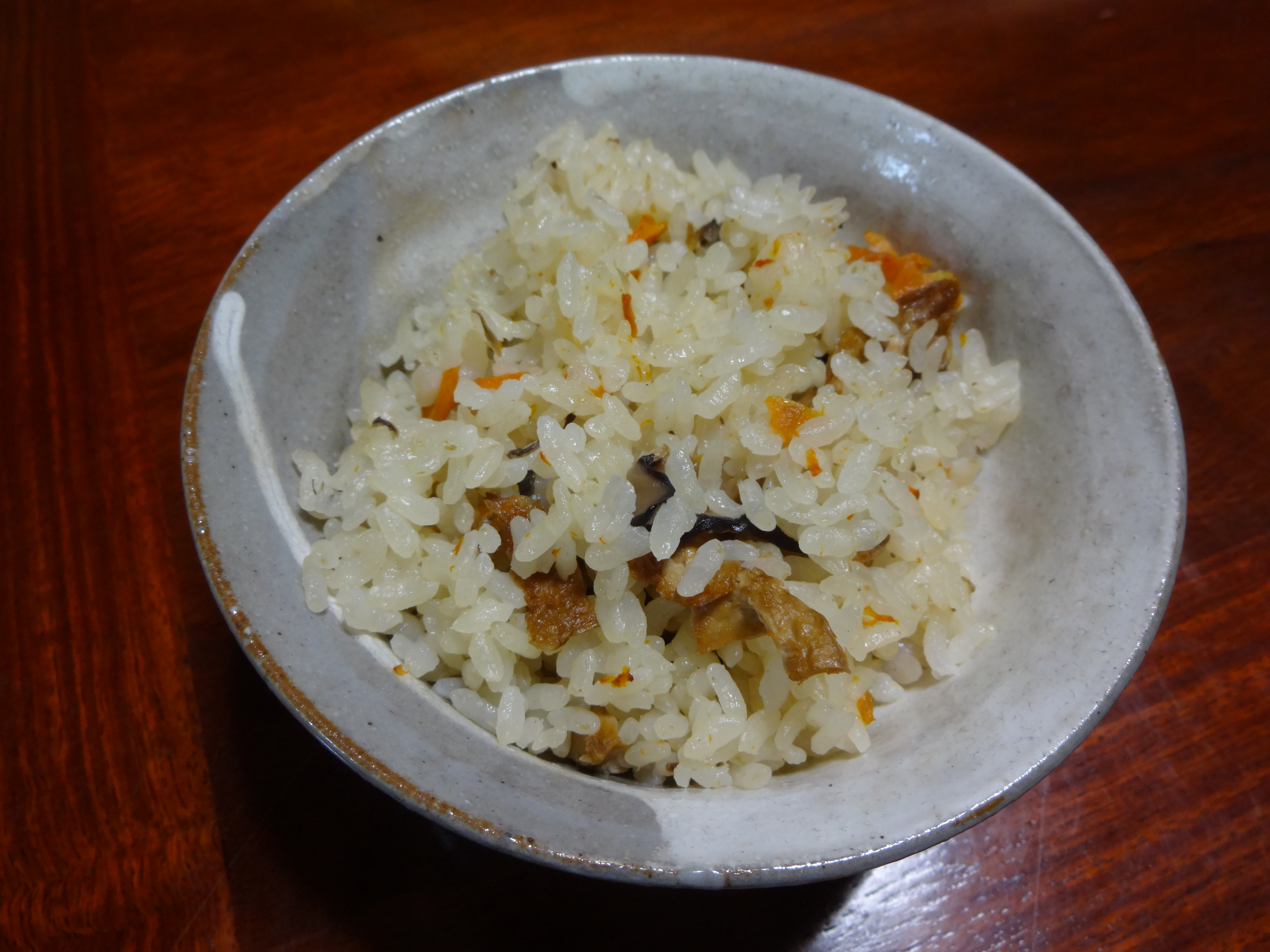
With Kakamigahara carrots

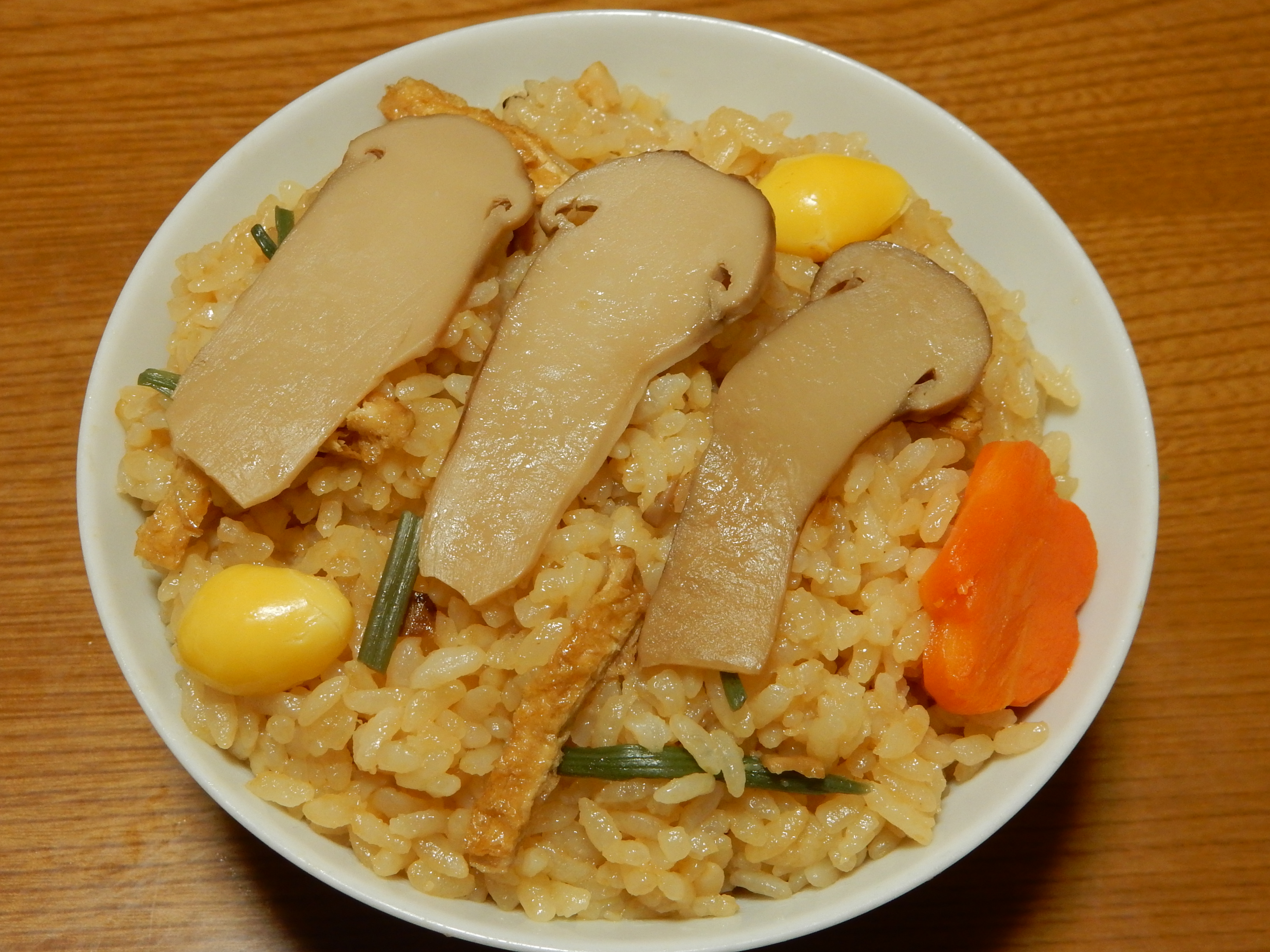
With matsutake mushrooms

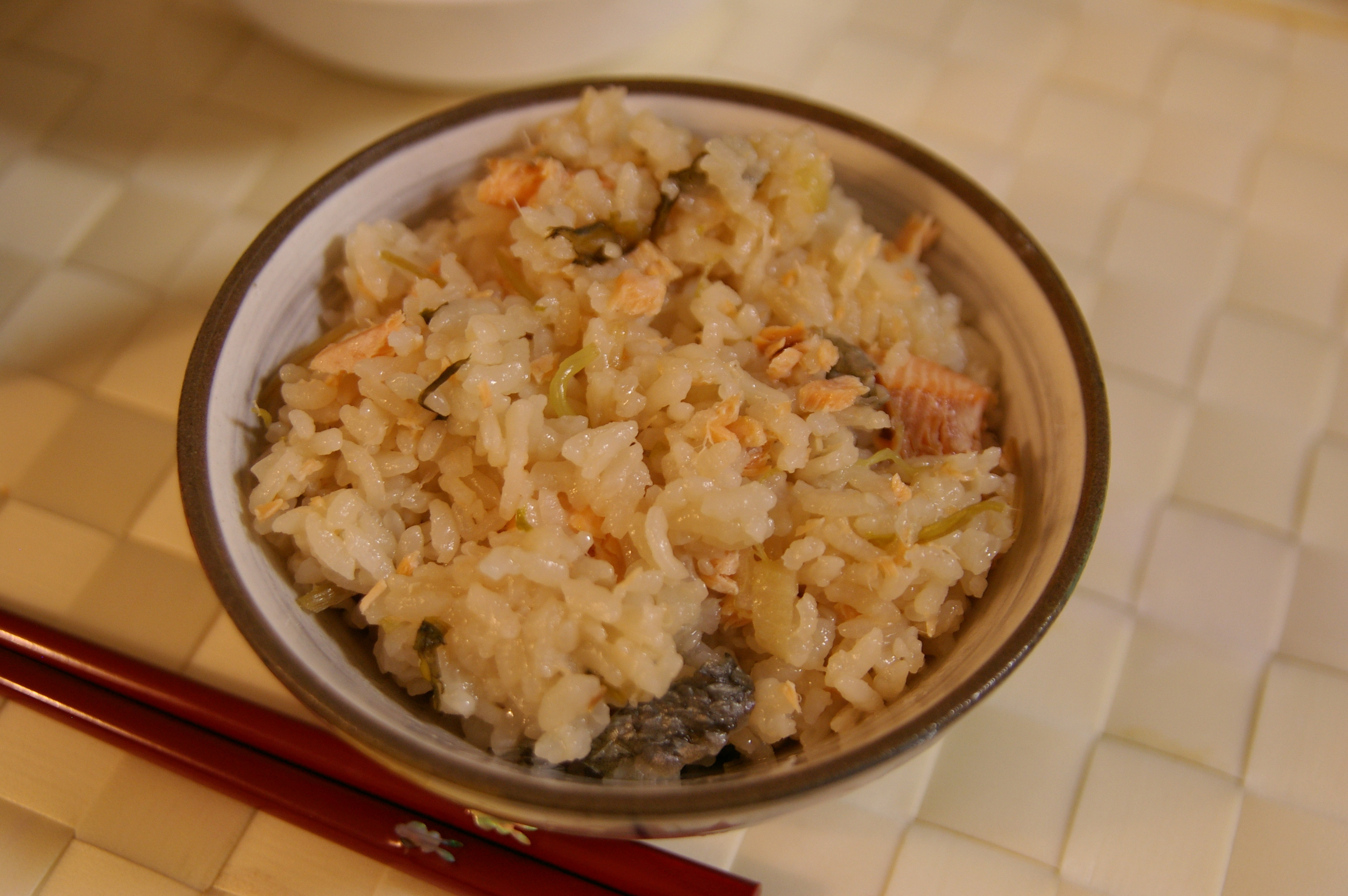
With salmon

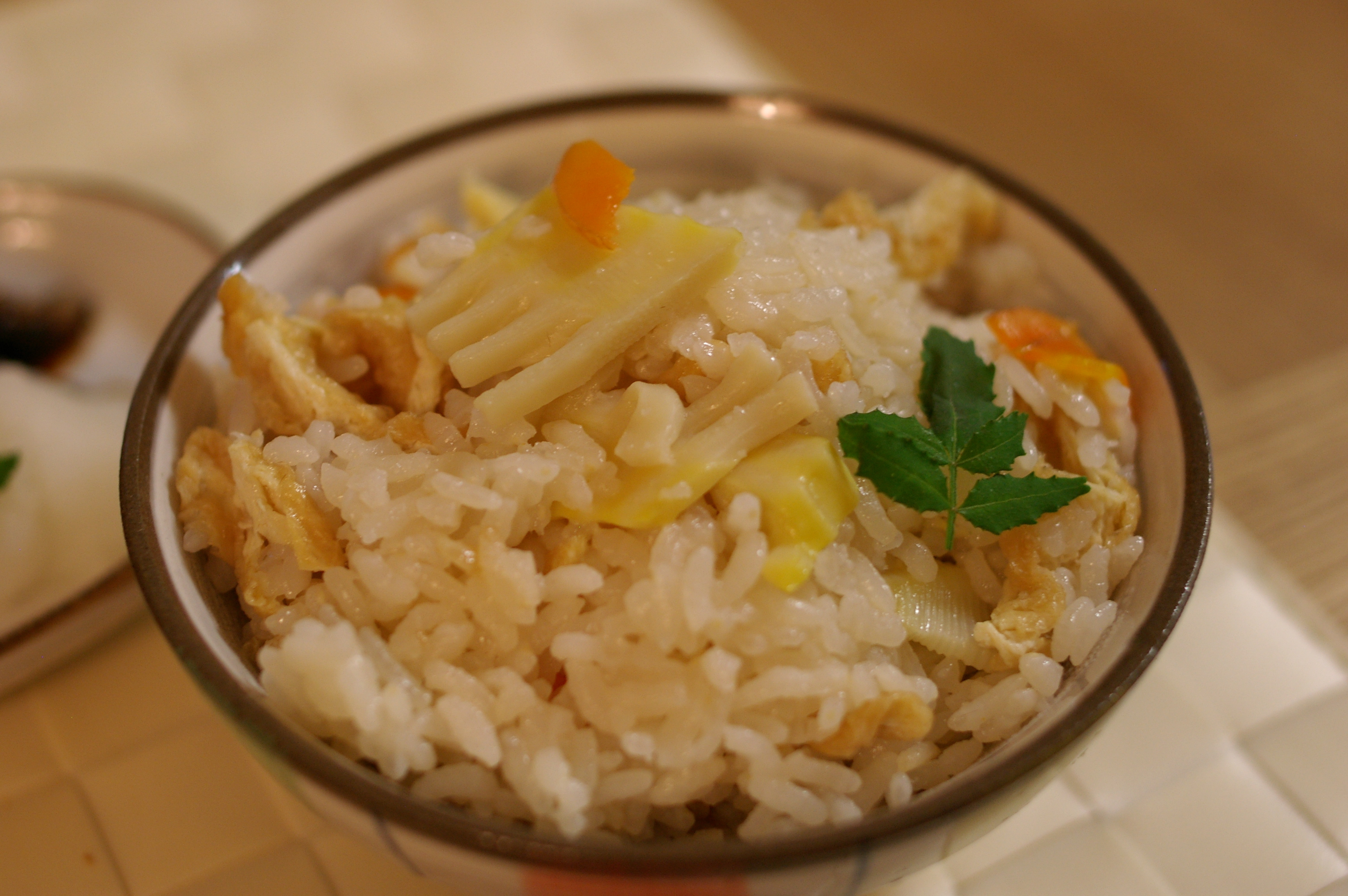
With bamboo shoots

== See also ==
- List of Japanese dishes
- Chahan, Japanese fried rice dish, also known as yakimeshi
- Gyūdon, Japanese rice bowl topped with beef and onion
