= KFC rice =

Variation of takikomi gohan

- Alternative names: Devil cooked rice
- Type: Takikomi gohan
- Course: Main course
- Place of origin: Japan
- Region or state: East Asia
- Invented: 1974
- Main ingredients: Rice, fried chicken
- Ingredients generally used: Chicken stock, soy sauce, salt, black pepper, scallions

KFC rice—also known as devil cooked rice, devil's takikomi gohan (Japanese: 悪魔の炊き込みご飯, romanized: Akuma no takikomi gohan), Kentucky takikomi gohan (Japanese: ケンタッキー炊き込みご飯, romanized: Kentakkii takikomi gohan), and KFC takikomi gohan (Japanese: KFC炊き込みご飯, romanized: KFC takikomi gohan)—is a variation of takikomi gohan using fried chicken. It is prepared in a rice cooker. The rice is often mixed with chicken stock and soy sauce before adding the fried chicken. Per its name, the fried chicken used is typically the Original Recipe chicken sold by the American fast food chain KFC, though the dish can be made with any other type of fried chicken. The dish originated in Japan, where KFC is notably popular.

== History ==
According to Mashable, KFC rice originated from a 1974 marketing campaign that encouraged Japanese families to cook the dish at home. A similar recipe using the same name was published by English-language Japanese culture website SoraNews24 in 2013, albeit using additional ingredients such as diced tomatoes and shimeji.

KFC rice was popularized in December 2019 following the publication of an article detailing its preparation in the Japanese publication Gadget News, which gained wider attention in East Asia and the West as a "KFC rice cooker hack" for making a simple, flavorful rice dish. Some sources, such as Ilyas Sholihyn of Singaporean lifestyle website AsiaOne, have suggested it was intended as a quick, cheap Christmas dinner, owing to the timing of the article's publication and the popularity of KFC in Japan around Christmas.

Despite its name, KFC rice is not actually an official KFC menu item sold in any region. Though KFC does sell rice dishes in certain regions—such as chicken katsu rice bowls in Japan, jollof rice topped with fried chicken in Nigeria, and zongzi in China—these are separate dishes that are prepared differently from KFC rice.

== Preparation ==
Per numerous sources, including KFC's official global website, KFC rice is prepared by mixing uncooked rice with chicken stock and soy sauce, then steaming it with two or more whole pieces of fried chicken in a rice cooker. The fried chicken and other ingredients impart an umami fried chicken flavor to the rice without affecting the chicken's texture. After cooking, the fried chicken is shredded and mixed with the rice, and the bones are removed. It can be served as-is, though many recipes call for it to be topped with salt, black pepper, or scallions.

== Reception ==
Ni'Kesia Pannell of Business Insider prepared KFC rice herself and stated "it didn't taste as flavorful as I thought it would" despite her expectations using KFC's 11 herbs and spices, but noted it was "really easy to customize", with the additions of hot sauce, butter, and additional soy sauce improving it in her opinion. She recommended it for those on a tight budget or for meal prep, and suggested experimenting with the addition of vegetables and using fried chicken from other fast food chains such as Popeyes and Bojangles.

Sukhbir Cheema of Mashable SEA noted KFC rice would negatively affect any plans of maintaining a healthy diet, and suggested adding chopped carrots, broccoli, mushrooms, or lettuce to balance it out.

== See also ==
- Hainanese chicken rice
- List of rice dishes
