= Claypot rice =

Chinese rice dish

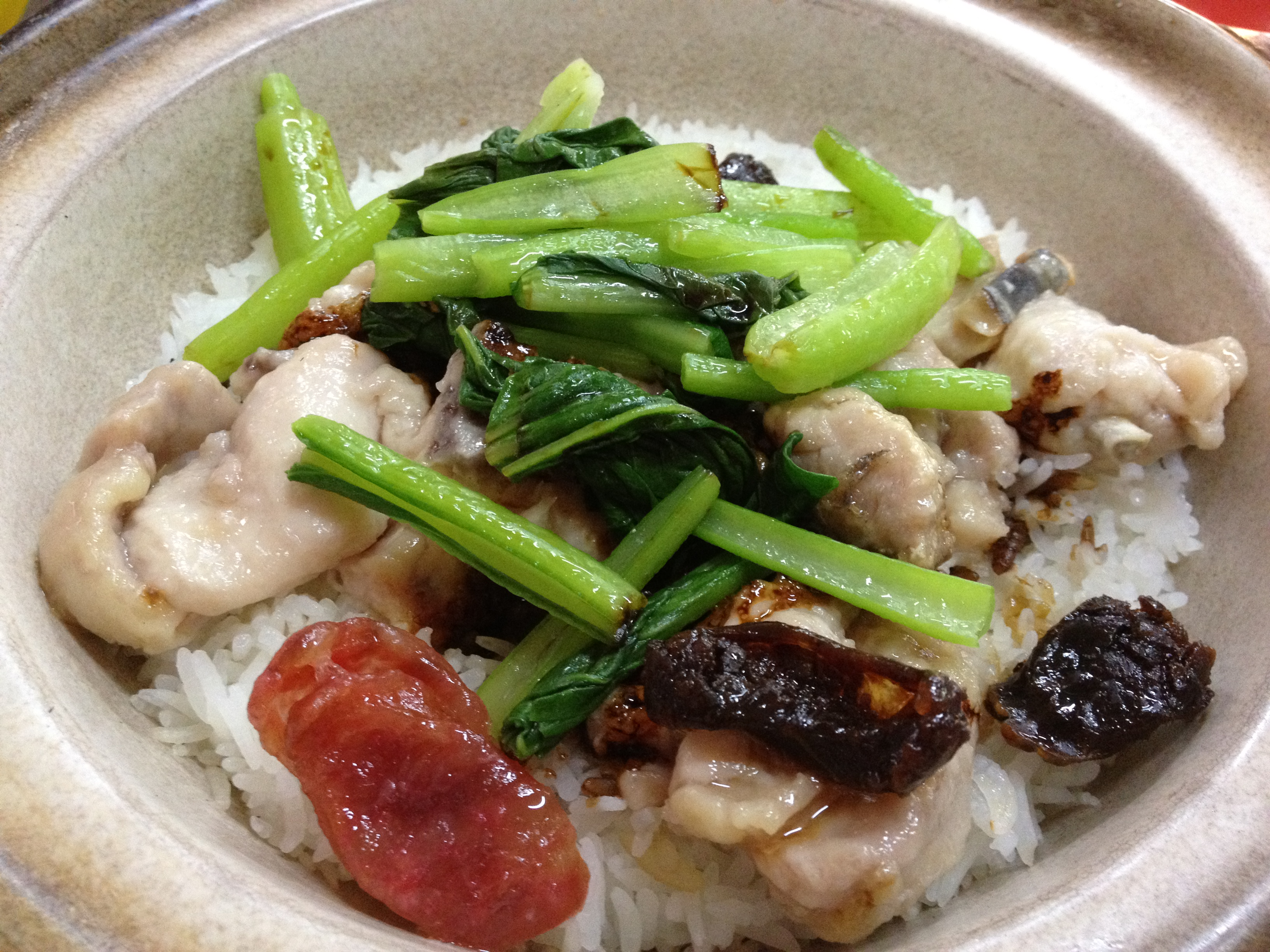
- Singapore-style claypot chicken rice with sliced chicken, salted fish, Chinese sausage and vegetables.
- Place of origin: China, Hong Kong
- Region or state: Guangdong
- Main ingredients: Rice, chicken, Chinese sausage

Chinese name
- Traditional Chinese: 煲仔飯
- Jyutping: bou1 zai2 faan6
Transcriptions
Yue: Cantonese
- Jyutping: bou1 zai2 faan6

Alternative Chinese name
- Traditional Chinese: 沙煲飯
- Jyutping: saa1 bou1 faan6
Transcriptions
Yue: Cantonese
- Jyutping: saa1 bou1 faan6

Claypot rice (Chinese: 煲仔飯; Jyutping: bou1 zai2 faan6 or Chinese: 沙煲飯; Jyutping: saa1 bou1 faan6), sometimes translated as "rice casserole", is a Chinese traditional dinner eaten in Guangdong in Southern China as well as the Chinese communities of Malaysia, Indonesia, Singapore and Thailand.

The rice is presoaked, or in some cases par-cooked, and finished in the claypot with other ingredients which then flavor the rice. The bottom develops a scorched rice crust similar to that in Korean dolsot bibimbap or Iranian “tahdig” and Spanish paella. It is commonly served with chicken, Chinese sausage and vegetables in some regions, but most restaurants offer a customizable dish with many protein options.

Traditionally, the dish is cooked over a charcoal stove, giving it a distinctive flavor. Some places serve it with thick, sweetened soy sauce and sometimes dried salted fish. Due to the time-consuming method of preparation and slow-cooking in a claypot, customers may have to wait a period of time (typically 30 to 45 minutes) before the dish is ready.

== Gallery ==
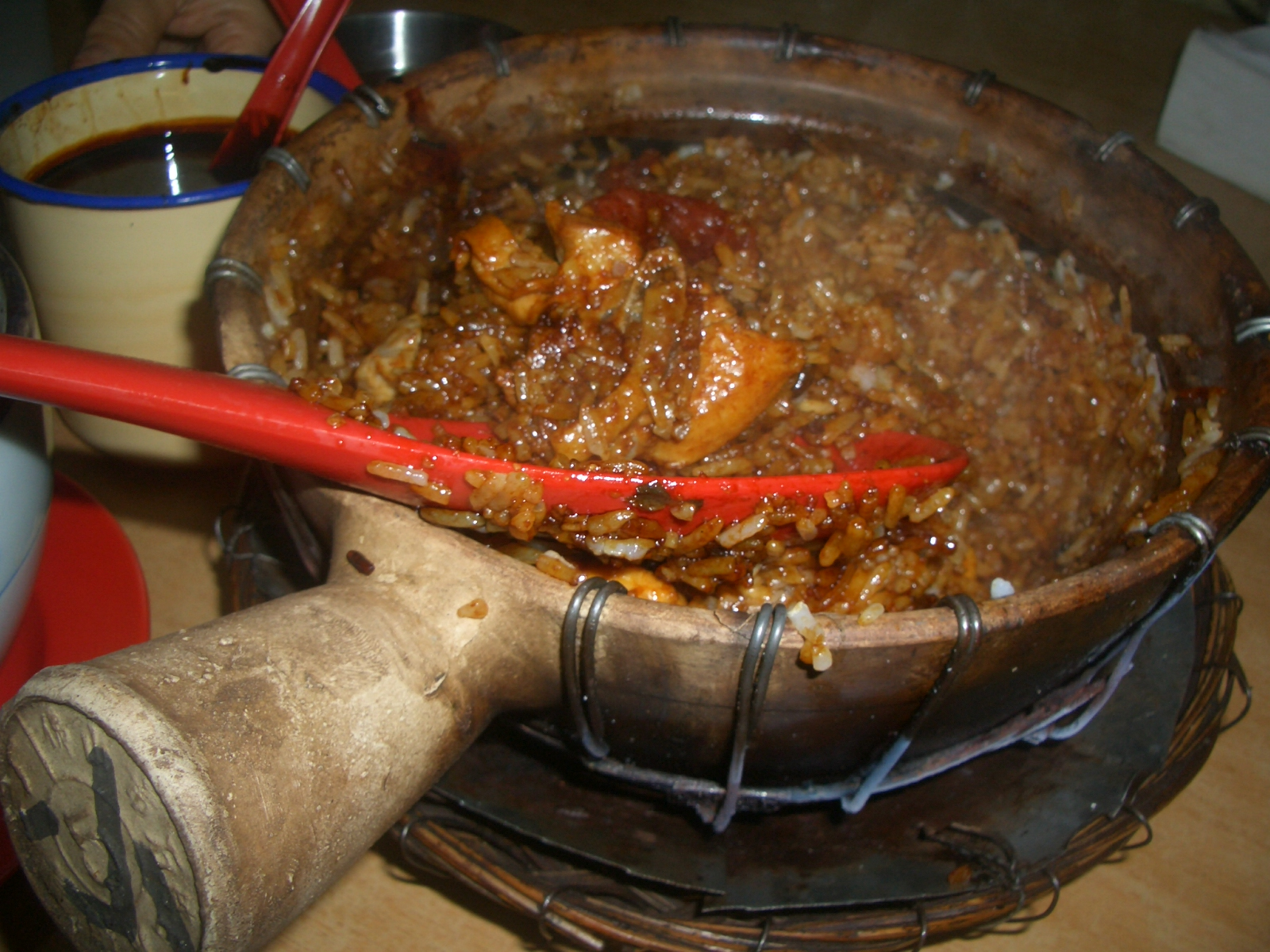
Claypot chicken rice with added dark soya sauce

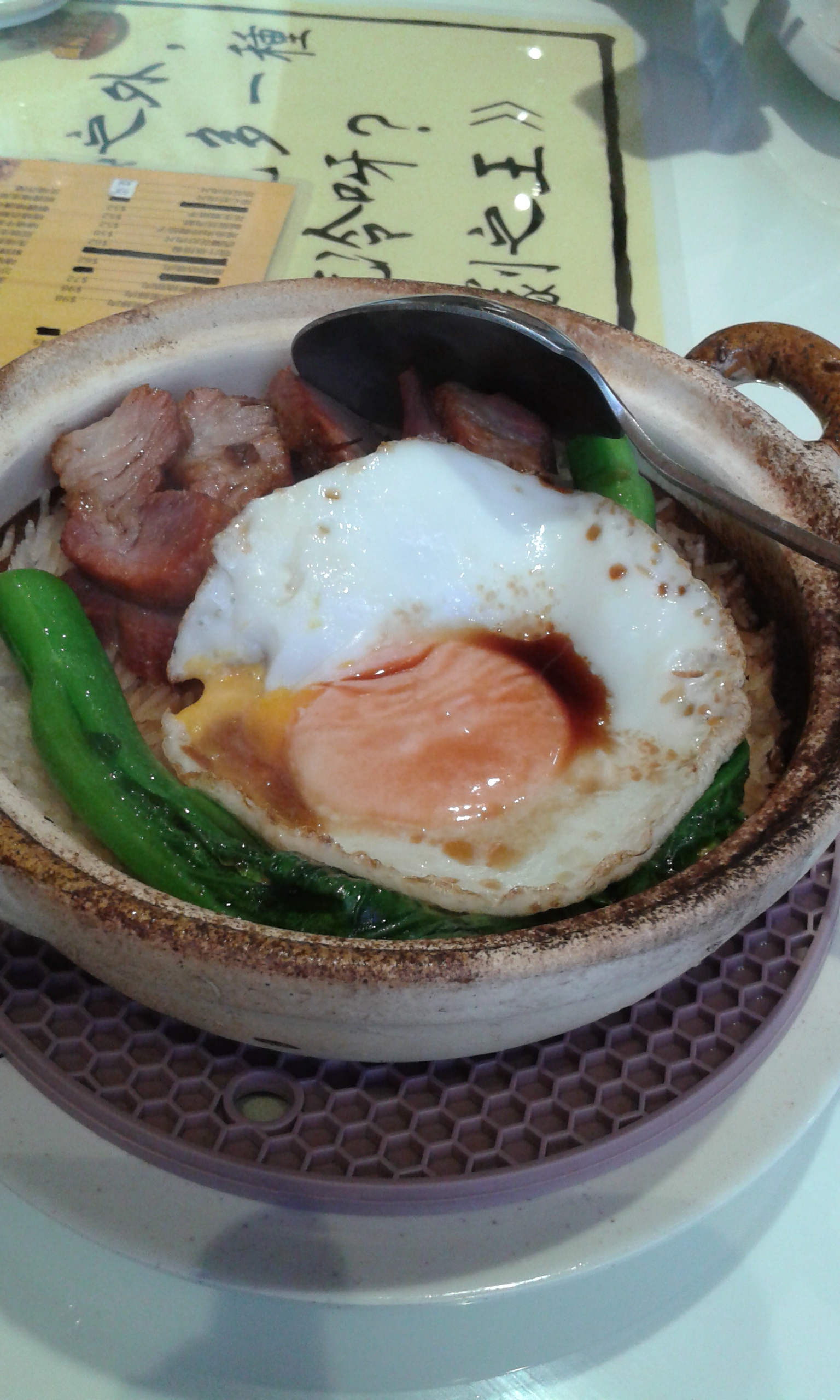
Cantonese casserole rice

== See also ==
- Satti sorru
- Clay pot cooking
- Dolsot bibimbap
- Kamameshi
- Sapo tahu
- List of rice dishes
