= Satti sorru =

Indian rice and meat dish

- Place of origin: India; Malaysia; Singapore
- Main ingredients: Rice, spices, chicken, mutton, seafood, and sometimes wild boar or monitor lizard

Satti sorru (Tamil: சட்டி சோறு, romanized: Caṭṭi cōṟu) also known as Indian claypot rice, is a dish common in the Indian communities of India, Malaysia, Indonesia and Singapore. Satti soru, which means 'clay pot rice' in Tamil, is a fairly common dish in South Indian households. Gravy from a curry is mixed into rice, to clean out the pan or the wok the curry was cooked in.

== Preparation ==
It is typically prepared by cooking rice along with various ingredients in a clay pot over a low fire or stove. The cooking pots are called man panai or man satti in Tamil, The clay pot helps retain moisture and infuse the rice with a unique aroma. Common ingredients include rice, spices, vegetables, meat, seafood and sometimes exotic meat such as monitor lizard and wild boar. Spices commonly used in the dish may include cumin, coriander, turmeric, cinnamon, cardamom, and cloves.

== See also ==
- Clay pot cooking
- List of rice dishes
