= Fish moolie =

Spicy fish and coconut dish

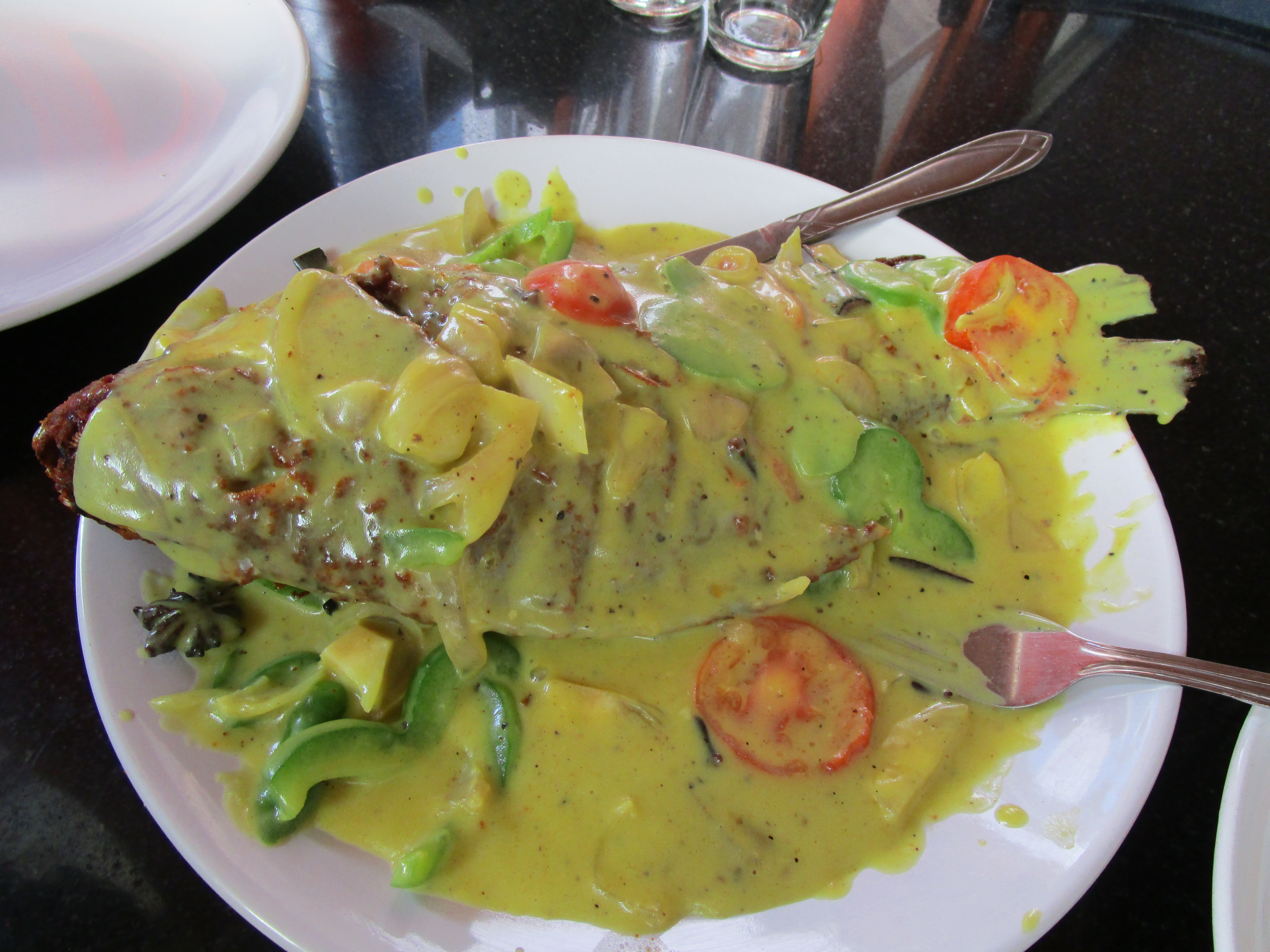
Fish Moilee Kerala Style (a.k.a. Kerala Fish Molly)

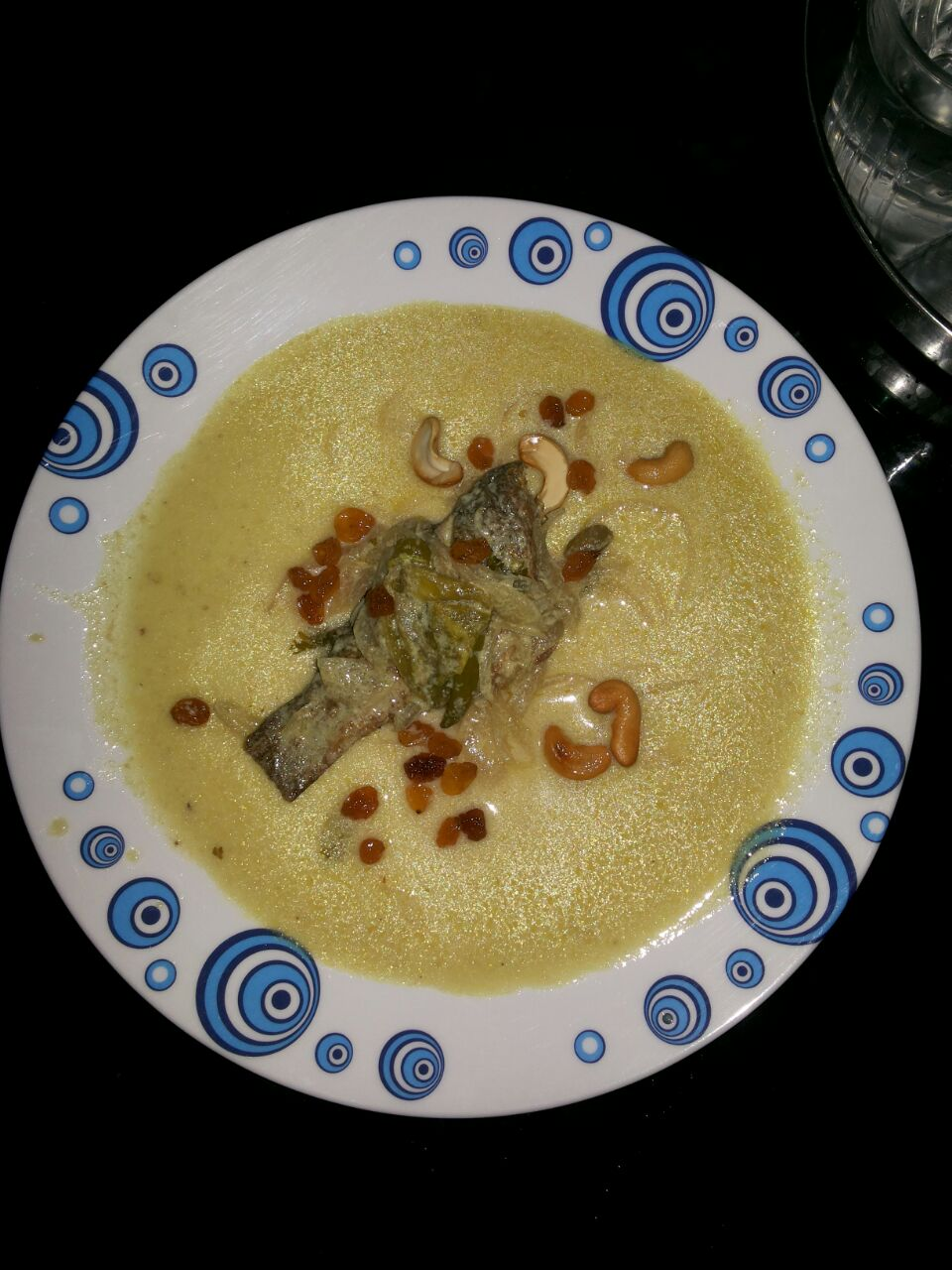
Fish Moilee

Fish moilee/moily or fish molee (meen molee) is a spicy fish and coconut dish of possible Portuguese or Indian origin. It is common in India, Malaysia and Singapore. During the times of the British Empire, it spread into other places of South-East Asia, such as Singapore.

The name may be associated with a kind of curry known among Malayali in Southern India as Moli.
