= 2008 =

2008 in various calendars
- Gregorian calendar: 2008; MMVIII
- Ab urbe condita: 2761
- Armenian calendar: 1457; ԹՎ ՌՆԾԷ
- Assyrian calendar: 6758
- Baháʼí calendar: 164–165
- Balinese saka calendar: 1929–1930
- Bengali calendar: 1414–1415
- Berber calendar: 2958
- British Regnal year: 56 Eliz. 2 – 57 Eliz. 2
- Buddhist calendar: 2552
- Burmese calendar: 1370
- Byzantine calendar: 7516–7517
- Chinese calendar: 丁亥年 (Fire Pig); 4705 or 4498 — to — 戊子年 (Earth Rat); 4706 or 4499
- Coptic calendar: 1724–1725
- Discordian calendar: 3174
- Ethiopian calendar: 2000–2001
- Hebrew calendar: 5768–5769
- Hindu calendars
- Vikram Samvat: 2064–2065
- Shaka Samvat: 1929–1930
- Kali Yuga: 5108–5109
- Holocene calendar: 12008
- Igbo calendar: 1008–1009
- Iranian calendar: 1386–1387
- Islamic calendar: 1428–1430
- Japanese calendar: Heisei 20 (平成２０年)
- Javanese calendar: 1940–1941
- Juche calendar: 97
- Julian calendar: Gregorian minus 13 days
- Korean calendar: 4341
- Minguo calendar: ROC 97 民國97年
- Nanakshahi calendar: 540
- Thai solar calendar: 2551
- Tibetan calendar: མེ་མོ་ཕག་ལོ་ (female Fire-Boar); 2134 or 1753 or 981 — to — ས་ཕོ་བྱི་བ་ལོ་ (male Earth-Rat); 2135 or 1754 or 982
- Unix time: 1199145600 – 1230767999

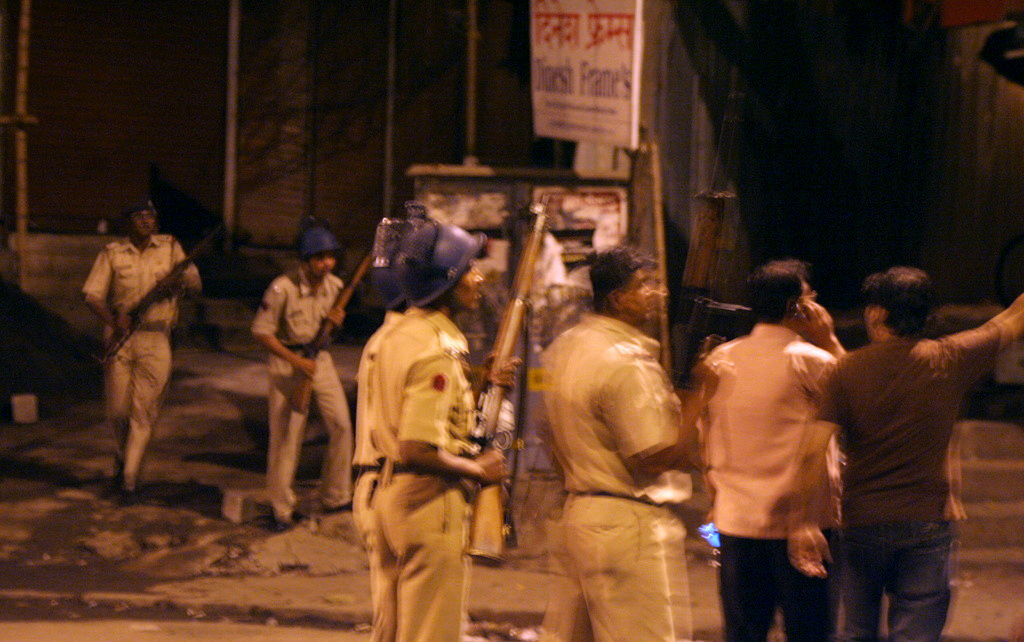
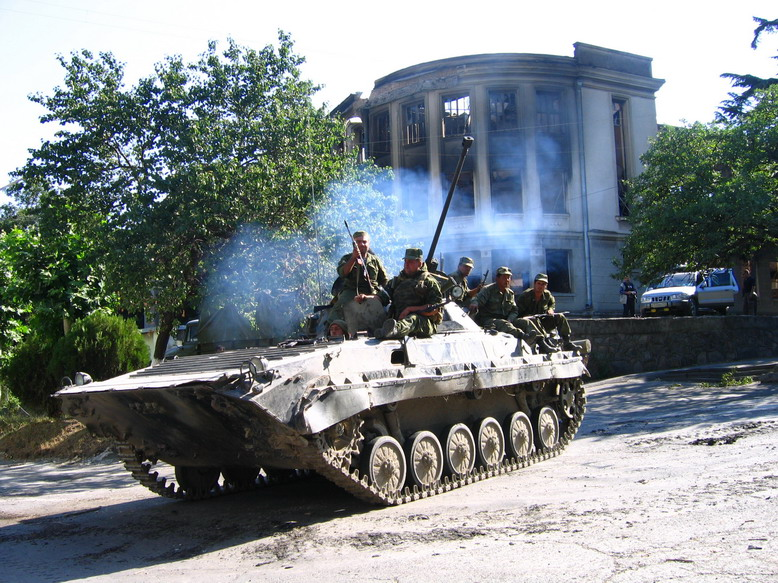
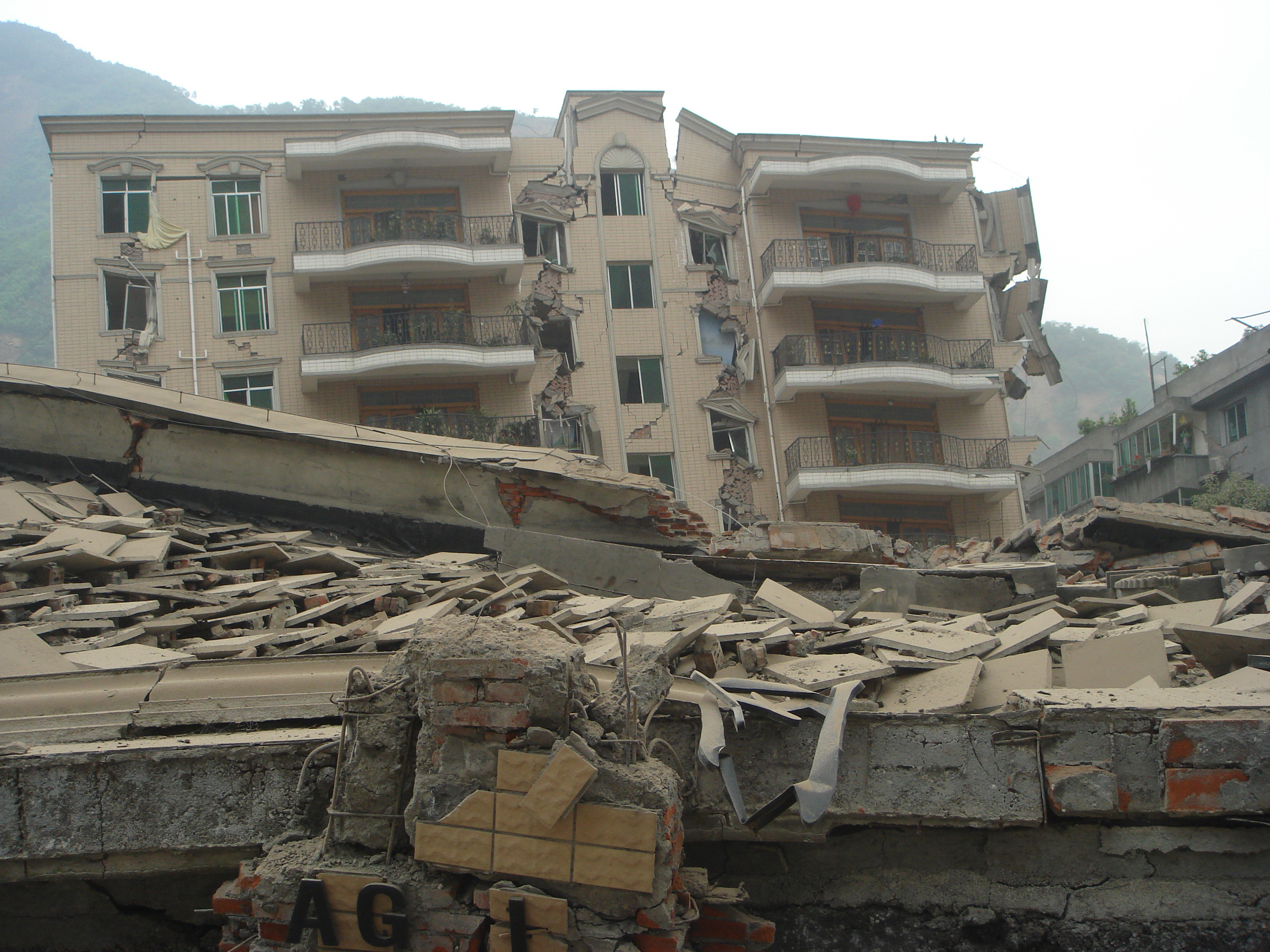
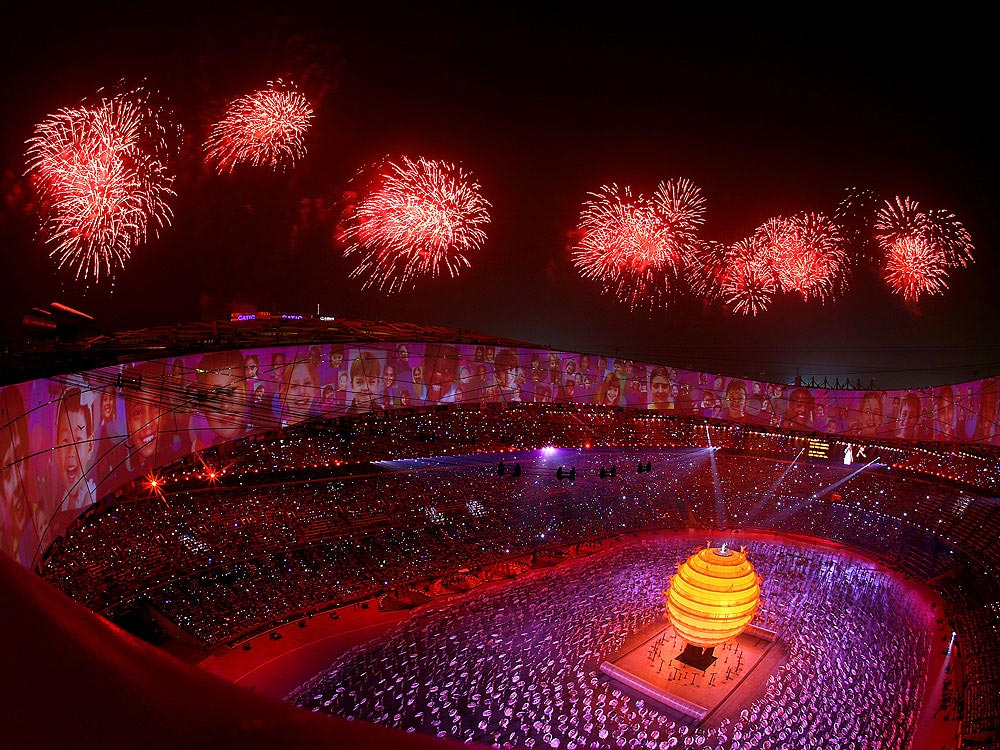
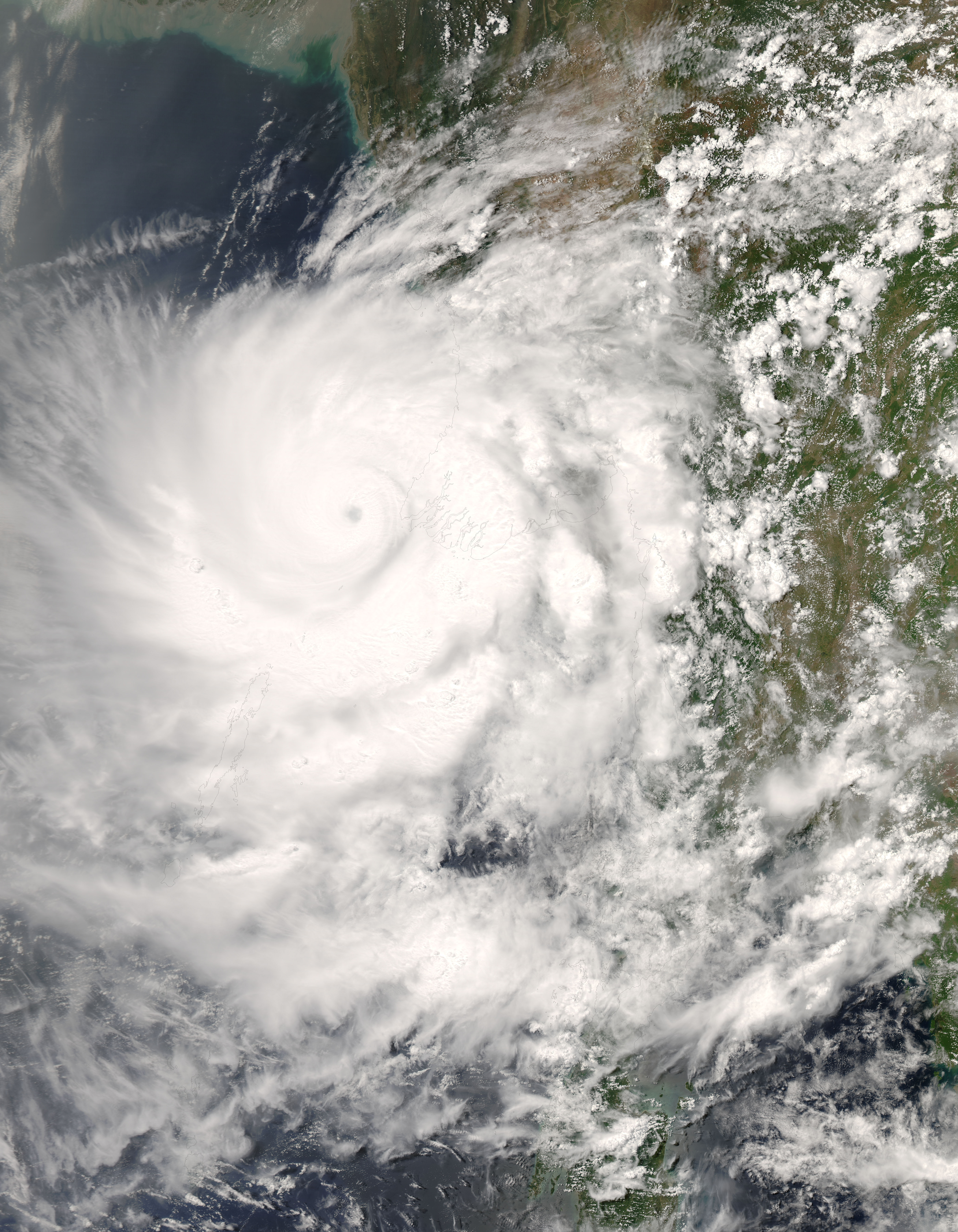
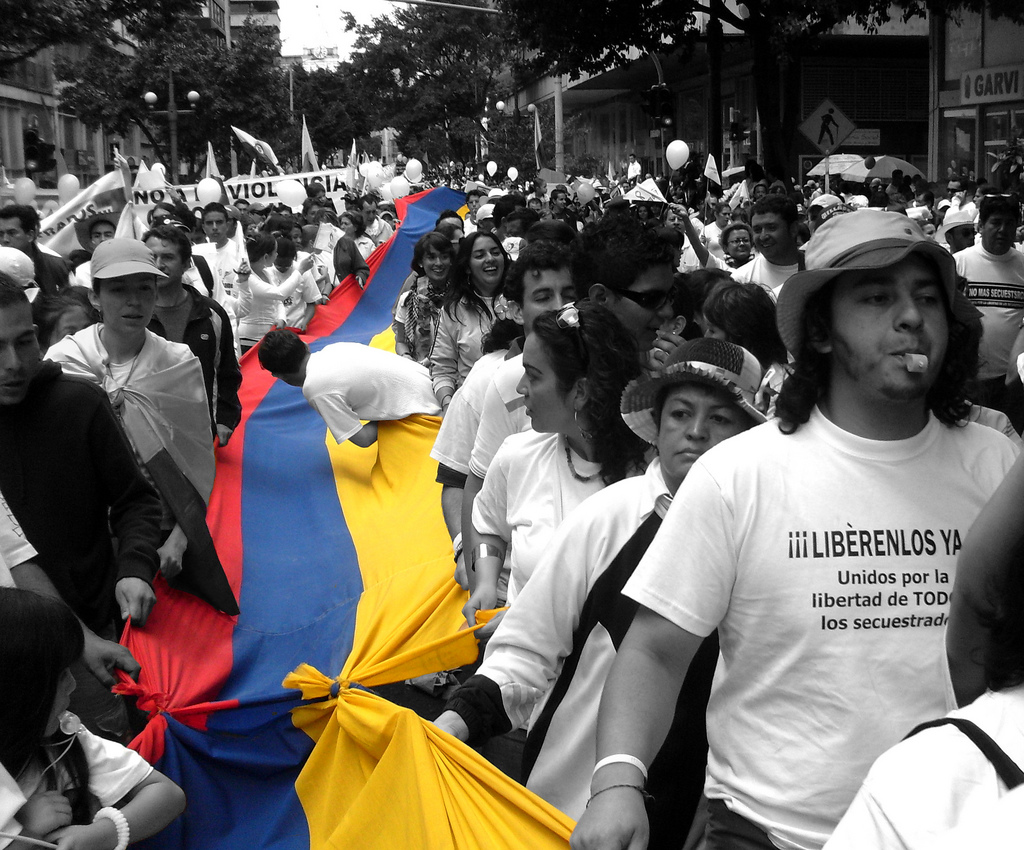
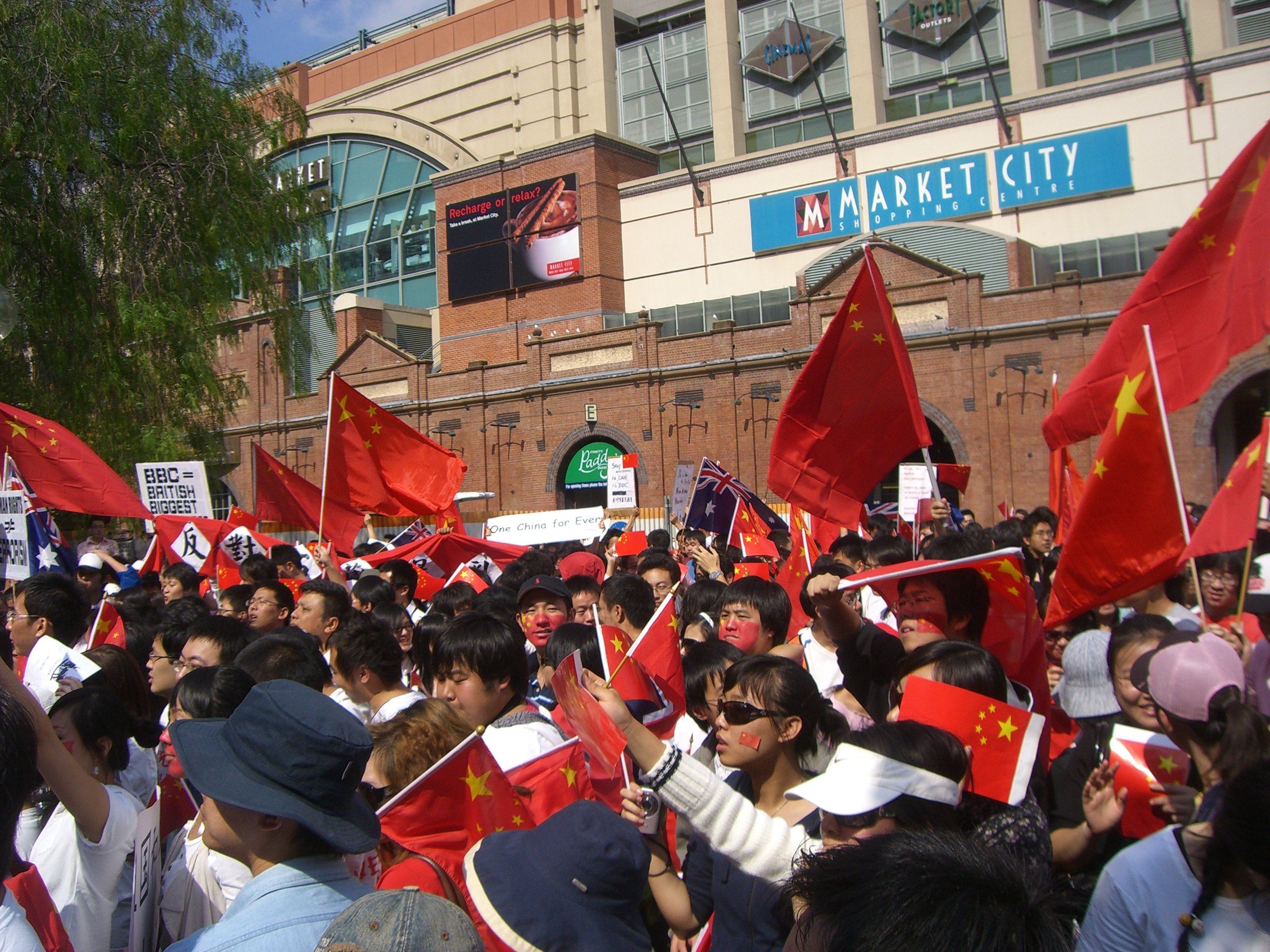
From left to right, top to bottom:
- Terrorist attacks in Mumbai kill 166 people and injure more than 300 people;
- The bankruptcy of Lehman Brothers occurs during the 2008 financial crisis and Great Recession; it is also known as the climax of the crisis;
- The Russo-Georgian War took place between Russia and Georgia;
- An earthquake in Sichuan, China kills 88,000;
- The 2008 Summer Olympics took place in Beijing, China;
- Cyclone Nargis kills 138,000 people in Myanmar;
- The one million voices against FARC civic mobilizations in different parts of the world under the slogan Colombia soy yo;
- The Kingston Fossil Plant coal fly ash slurry spill, a major environmental disaster that occurred in Roane County, Tennessee;
- The 2008 Tibetan unrest, a series of protests and demonstrations against Chinese rule in Tibet.

2008 (MMVIII) was a leap year starting on Tuesday of the Gregorian calendar, the 2008th year of the Common Era (CE) and Anno Domini (AD) designations, the 8th year of the 3rd millennium and the 21st century, and the 9th year of the 2000s decade.

2008 is designated as:

- International Year of Languages
- International Year of Planet Earth
- International Year of the Potato
- International Year of Sanitation

The Great Recession, a worldwide recession which began in 2007, continued through the entirety of 2008.

== Population ==
The world population on January 1, 2008, was estimated to be 6.801 billion people and increased to 6.888 billion people by January 1, 2009. An estimated 141.8 million births and 54.0 million deaths took place in 2008. The average global life expectancy was 69.3 years, an increase of 0.3 years from 2007. The estimated number of global refugees decreased from 11.4 million to 10.5 million by the end of the year. The largest sources of refugees were Afghanistan with 2.8 million people and Iraq with 1.9 million people.

== Conflicts ==
There were 37 conflicts in 2008 that resulted in at least 25 fatalities, five of which resulted in at least 1,000 fatalities: the Iraqi insurgency, the Taliban insurgency, conflict with the Pakistani Taliban, Eelam War IV in Sri Lanka, and the Somali Civil War. A border conflict broke out for two days between Djibouti and Eritrea, ending with Eritrean occupation of the disputed area, Ras Doumeira. This was the first conflict in four years where two sovereign states fought each other directly. The Russo-Georgian War occurred in August when Georgia engaged in warfare with the breakaway state South Ossetia following a series of skirmishes. Russia backed South Ossetia and sent 10,000 soldiers into the fight, progressing further into Georgia until a ceasefire was established.

Two separatist rebel groups escalated conflict in India: Dima Halam Daogah sought a Dimasa state and the United National Liberation Front sought a Manipuri state. Ten armed militants, claimed by the Pakistani organization Lashkar-e-Taiba, captured several targets in Mumbai on November 26, and battles with Indian soldiers led to approximately 160 deaths. The Taliban insurgency grew in strength and launched several attacks against American soldiers in Afghanistan, and conflict with Islamist insurgents took place along the Afghanistan–Pakistan border. The Kashmir conflict was reignited in 2008, including a clash with police that left dozens dead after protests against a land transfer for a Hindu shrine turned violent.

Renewed fighting took place in the Israeli–Palestinian conflict after the militant group Hamas attacked the Gaza–Israel barrier, allowing Palestinian people to escape the Gaza Strip, and launched attacks on Israel. Israel responded by launching attacks into the Gaza Strip.

Peace talks were held between Uganda and the Lord's Resistance Army (LRA) to end the LRA's insurgency, but LRA leader Joseph Kony refused to attend a final peace agreement and government operations against the LRA resumed in December. Peace talks were also held for the Central African Bush War and the Somali Civil War, but rebels were unable to reach final agreements in these conflicts. The National Forces of Liberation resumed its insurgency in Burundi when peace talks collapsed in January, but a ceasefire was established in December. Progress was made toward peace in the First Ivorian Civil War with preparations to integrate the Forces Nouvelles de Côte d'Ivoire into the Ivorian military.

== Culture ==
The highest-grossing film globally in 2008 was The Dark Knight, followed by Indiana Jones and the Kingdom of the Crystal Skull and Kung Fu Panda.

The best-selling album globally in 2008 was Viva la Vida or Death and All His Friends by Coldplay, followed by Black Ice by AC/DC and Mamma Mia! The Movie Soundtrack. The first lady of France, singer Carla Bruni, released a controversial song comparing her loving marriage to addictive drugs from Afghanistan and Colombia.

Most popular video games that were released in the year of 2008 were Super Smash Bros Brawl, Mario Kart Wii, Grand Theft Auto IV, and Fallout 3.

The 2008 Summer Olympics were held in Beijing, making them the first Olympic Games to take place in China. The 2008 U.S. Open brought attention to the golf world when Tiger Woods won an upset victory over Rocco Mediate. National Basketball Association rivals, the Boston Celtics and the Los Angeles Lakers, faced each other in the 2008 NBA Finals with a victory for the Celtics. Venus Williams defeated her sister Serena Williams in the 2008 Wimbledon Championships in one of their many match-ups against each other. Rafael Nadal defeated Roger Federer in the men's singles.

== Economy ==
The economy underwent a global financial crisis in 2008 following the American subprime mortgage crisis from the previous year, causing the worst recession since the Great Depression. The economy was affected by bank failures, stock market crashes, and credit freezes. A dramatic escalation in September prompted international efforts to restore consumer confidence and resolve credit freezes. Measures such as bailouts for financial institutions and liquidity injections were implemented throughout the year. Banking in Iceland collapsed in October.

Gross world product increased by approximately 2.5% in 2008. International trade grew by 4.3%, slowing from the 6.4% growth in 2007. Commodity prices continued their previous upward trajectory until halfway into the year when they dropped sharply. The price of oil was especially affected with its 60% drop.

The Follow-up International Conference on Financing for Development to Review the Implementation of the Monterrey Consensus was held in November and December in Doha to continue talks on global economic reform.

== Environment and weather ==
The year 2008 was the eighth hottest year on record, tied with 2001. The year began with a La Niña that continued from late 2007, with unusually cold temperatures occurring in the Middle East, central Asia, and China. Australia had its warmest January on record, followed by a heat wave in South Australia later in March. The year had above average precipitation, with Guangzhou, Hong Kong, and Macau experiencing their wettest month on record in June. A severe drought persisted in central South America from January until September. Approximately 87,500 people were killed by a magnitude 7.9 earthquake in Sichuan, China.

The 2008 Atlantic hurricane season was more intense than usual due to La Ninã earlier in the year combined with above average sea surface temperatures. There were sixteen tropical storms, including eight hurricanes. The year's major hurricanes were Hurricane Gustav, Hurricane Ike, Hurricane Paloma, Hurricane Omar, and Hurricane Bertha. The 2008 Pacific typhoon season was less intense than usual with the fourth lowest accumulated cyclone energy index on record. There were twenty-six tropical cyclones, including twelve typhoons. The year's intense typhoons were Typhoon Jangmi, Typhoon Rammasun, Typhoon Nakri, Typhoon Sinlaku, and Typhoon Hagupit. The tropical cyclones caused severe floods and landslides in the Philippines and southern China. The season was the first since 1984 where no tropical cyclones made landfall in Japan.

== Health ==
An ongoing food price crisis meant that there were nearly one billion undernourished people in the world. An outbreak of salmonella occurred in the United States after the importation of contaminated peppers. Baby formula in China was mixed with melamine as a cost-cutting measure, affecting thousands of infants. Two first-time trachea transplants occurred in 2008; one used a woman's own stem cells to prevent transplant rejection, and one using a trachea donated from a deceased human.

== Politics and law ==
The global financial crisis dominated the political world in 2008, and a summit was held by the G20 in November.

Barack Obama was elected the 44th president of the United States in November, becoming the first African-American to be elected president. Silvio Berlusconi returned as Prime Minister of Italy. Raúl Castro succeeded his brother Fidel Castro as President of Cuba. Dmitry Medvedev was elected the 3rd president of Russia in March, but his predecessor Vladimir Putin retained power through the office of prime minister. President Pervez Musharraf of Pakistan resigned in August as the country was subject to attacks by Islamist insurgents. He was succeeded by Asif Ali Zardari, the husband of former prime minister Benazir Bhutto who had been assassinated the previous year. President Robert Mugabe retained power after the 2008 Zimbabwe election and subsequent negotiations by violently suppressing opposition.

The Russo-Georgian War negatively affected Russian relations with the Western world. During the conflict, it recognized Abkhazia and South Ossetia as independent countries from Georgia.

Kosovo declared its independence from Serbia on February 17; Serbia did not recognize Kosovo's independence, but it received support and recognition from many Western countries. The European Union initiated the EULEX mission to assist in a stable transition to independence. Former Bosnian politician Radovan Karadžić was captured and put on trial for his involvement in the Bosnian genocide.

Political prisoner Íngrid Betancourt was rescued from the Revolutionary Armed Forces of Colombia after six years of captivity.

The International Atomic Energy Agency accused Iran of expanding its nuclear program.

== Science ==
The Large Hadron Collider was completed in 2008 and put into operation on September 10, but a malfunction occurred and its first experiment was delayed.

The Svalbard Global Seed Vault opened in February 2008 to preserve specimens for all of Earth's crops.

The Cassini–Huygens orbiter flew through the geyser of Saturn's moon Enceladus on March 12. The Phoenix lander arrived at the Martian arctic on May 25 and confirmed subsurface ice on July 31.

== Events ==
=== January ===
- January 1 – Cyprus and Malta adopt the euro currency.
- January 14 — At 19:04:39 UTC, the uncrewed MESSENGER space probe is at its closest approach during its first flyby of the planet Mercury.
- January 17 — British Airways Flight 38 crashes near London Heathrow, leaving 48 people injured.
- January 21
  - Stock markets around the world plunge amid growing fears of a U.S. Great Recession, fueled by the 2007 subprime mortgage crisis.
  - Online activist group Anonymous initiates Project Chanology, after a leaked interview of Tom Cruise by the Church of Scientology is published on YouTube, and the Church of Scientology issued a "copyright infringement" claim. In response, Anonymous sympathizers took to the streets to protest outside the church (after February 10), while the church's websites and centres were getting DoS attacks, phone line nukes, and black faxes.
- January 24 – A peace deal is signed in Goma, Democratic Republic of the Congo, ending the Kivu conflict.

=== February ===
- February 4 – Civic mobilizations in Colombia against FARC, under the name One million voices against FARC.
- February 14 – A Belavia CRJ-100 crash lands at Zvartnots International Airport in Yerevan, Armenia. 7 people are injured.
- February 17 – Kosovo formally declares independence from Serbia, to a mixed response from the international community.
- February 18 – WikiLeaks releases allegations of illegal activities carried out by the Cayman Islands branch of Swiss banking corporation Julius Baer; a subsequent lawsuit against WikiLeaks prompts a temporary suspension of the website, but uproar about violations of freedom of speech causes WikiLeaks to be brought back online.

=== March ===
- March 2 – Venezuela and Ecuador move troops to the Colombian border, following a Colombian raid against FARC guerrillas inside Ecuadorian territory, in which senior commander Raúl Reyes is killed.
- March 8 – Barisan Nasional loses two-thirds majority, for the first time since 1969, to opposition during the 2008 Malaysian general election but still retains control of government. The coalition also loses majority control of five states to the opposition.
- March 9 – The first European Space Agency Automated Transfer Vehicle, a cargo spacecraft for the International Space Station, launches from Guiana Space Centre in French Guiana.
- March 10 – Protests in Tibet against China's treatment of Tibetans begin.
- March 19 – An Energy release of a Gamma-ray burst called the GRB 080319B is the brightest event ever recorded in the Universe.
- March 24 – Bhutan holds its first-ever general elections following the adoption of a new Constitution which changed the country from an absolute monarchy to a multiparty democracy.
- March 25 – African Union and Comoros forces invade the rebel-held island of Anjouan, returning the island to Comorian control.

=== April ===
- April 19 – The Quito Ultratumba nightclub fire in Quito, Ecuador, kills 19 people and injures at least 24 more.
- April 29 – Grand Theft Auto IV is released worldwide, selling over 3.6 million units and earning $310 million during the first day, becoming not only the highest grossing video game release of all time, but also the highest grossing entertainment product release ever.

=== May ===
- May 2 – Iron Man is released in theaters, starting the Marvel Cinematic Universe.
- May 3 – Cyclone Nargis passes through Myanmar, killing more than 138,000 people.
- May 12
  - An earthquake measuring 7.9 on the moment magnitude scale strikes Sichuan, China, killing an estimated 87,000 people.
  - The mummified body of Hedviga Golik is found in her apartment in Zagreb, Croatia 42 years after her death.
- May 20–24 – The Eurovision Song Contest 2008 takes place in Belgrade, Serbia, and is won by Russian entrant Dima Bilan with the song "Believe".
- May 21
  - Manchester United wins their third European Cup and second Champions League after they beat Chelsea in the first all-English final in the history of the competition. Manchester United won the match 6–5 on penalties, following a 1–1 draw after extra time.
  - The Union of South American Nations, an intergovernmental organization between states in South America, is founded.
  - The International Court of Justice awards Middle Rocks to Malaysia and Pedra Branca to Singapore, ending a 29-year territorial dispute between the two countries.
- May 25 – NASA's uncrewed Phoenix spacecraft becomes the first to land on the northern polar region of Mars.
- May 28 – The Legislature Parliament of Nepal votes overwhelmingly in favor of abolishing the country's 240-year-old monarchy, turning the country into a republic.
- May 30 – International Convention on Cluster Munitions is adopted in Dublin.

=== June ===
- June 7–29 – Austria and Switzerland jointly host the UEFA Euro 2008 football tournament, which is won by Spain.
- June 11
  - The Fermi Gamma-ray Space Telescope is launched.
  - Canadian Prime Minister Stephen Harper formally apologizes, on behalf of the Canadian government, to the country's First Nations for the Canadian Indian residential school system.
- June 14 – Expo 2008 opens in Zaragoza, Spain, lasting to September 14, with the topic "Water and sustainable development".
- June 14 – A 6.9 magnitude earthquake in Iwate Prefecture, Japan, kills 12 and injures more than 400.
- June 21 – The Princess of the Stars, a passenger ferry owned by Filipino shipping company Sulpicio Lines, capsizes and sinks off the coast of San Fernando, Romblon, at the height of Typhoon Fengshen, resulting in 814 deaths.

=== July ===
- July 1 – Riots erupt in Mongolia in response to allegations of fraud surrounding the 2008 legislative elections.
- July 2 – Íngrid Betancourt and 14 other hostages are rescued from FARC rebels by Colombian security forces.
- July 10 – Apple Inc. launches the App Store with 500 apps available at launch.
- July 11 – South Korea suspends all trips to North Korea's Mount Kumgang after a 53-year-old South Korean tourist is shot and killed by a North Korean sentry.
- July 21 – Radovan Karadžić, the first president of the Republika Srpska, is arrested in Belgrade, Serbia, on allegations of war crimes, following a 12-year-long manhunt.

=== August ===
- August 1
  - India and United States sign the historic Civil Nuclear deal.
  - Eleven mountaineers from international expeditions die on K2, the second-highest mountain on Earth, in the worst single accident in the history of K2 mountaineering.
  - China opens its first high speed rail line.
- August 6 – President Sidi Ould Cheikh Abdallahi of Mauritania is deposed in a military coup d'état.
- August 7 – Georgia intervenes against Russian-backed separatists in its South-Ossetia and Abkhazia regions, causing Russia to invade Georgia and spark the Russo-Georgian war, the first major European land war of the 21st century.
- August 8–24 – The 2008 Summer Olympics were held in Beijing, China.
- August 20 – Spanair Flight 5022 crashes at Madrid–Barajas Airport, killing 154 people on board.

=== September ===
- September 5 – Quentin Bryce becomes the first female Governor-General of Australia.
- September 10 – The proton beam is circulated for the first time in the Large Hadron Collider, the world's largest and highest-energy particle accelerator, located at CERN, near Geneva, under the Franco-Swiss border.
- September 12 – A train collision occurred in Chatsworth, California, when a Metrolink train and Union Pacific local collided head-on.
- September 13 – Hurricane Ike makes landfall as a category 2 hurricane in Texas, killing 113 and causing over $30 billion in damages.
- September 14 — Aeroflot-Nord Flight 821 crashes on approach to Perm International Airport, killing all 88 occupants onboard.
- September 15 – 2008 financial crisis: Stocks fall sharply Monday on a triptych of Wall Street woe: Lehman Brothers' bankruptcy filing, Merrill Lynch's acquisition by Bank of America, and AIG's unprecedented request for short-term financing from the Federal Reserve.
- September 16 – The first two ten-million-digit primes, M_{43,112,609} and M_{37,156,667}, discovered on August 23 and September 6, respectively, are officially revealed.
- September 20 – A suicide truck bomb explosion destroys the Marriott Hotel in Islamabad, Pakistan, killing at least 54 and injuring 266.
- September 23 – HTC Dream, the first smartphone powered by Android, was launched.
- September 28 – SpaceX Falcon 1 becomes the world's first privately developed space launch vehicle to successfully make orbit.

=== October ===
- October 3 – 2008 financial crisis: U.S. President George W. Bush signs the revised Emergency Economic Stabilization Act into law, creating a 700 billion dollar Treasury fund to purchase failing bank assets.
- October 6 – A controversial Peruvian tape regarding a Norwegian oil company causes the 2008 Peru oil scandal, sparking protests which cause Jorge de Castillo to resign from office.
- October 13 – Microsoft announces the name Windows 7 to the public.
- October 21 – The Large Hadron Collider (LHC) is officially inaugurated at Geneva.
- October 22 – The Indian Space Research Organisation successfully launches the Chandrayaan-1 spacecraft on a lunar exploration mission.
- October 30 – Floods affected in Northern Vietnam and Central Vietnam and lasted 5 days causing flooding in many provinces and cities.
- October
  - The Easyswap on-line local exchange trading system (LETS) website is officially launched in Switzerland.

=== November ===
- November 1 – Satoshi Nakamoto publishes "Bitcoin: A Peer-to-Peer Electronic Cash System".
- November 2 – In a race won by Brazilian driver Felipe Massa, British driver Lewis Hamilton ends in 5th place in 2008 Brazilian Grand Prix and becomes the first black driver to win the Formula One World Championship, and the second youngest driver to achieve the feat at the age of 23.
- November 4 – 2008 United States presidential election: Democratic U.S. Senator Barack Obama defeats Republican candidate John McCain and is elected the 44th President of the United States, making him the first African-American to be elected to the office.
- November 11 – After 30 years in power, Maumoon Abdul Gayoom was succeeded by Mohamed Nasheed as the president of the Maldives.
- November 19 – Claudia Castillo of Spain becomes the first person to have a successful trachea transplant using a tissue-engineered organ.
- November 20 – The Buzzard Coulee meteorite falls in Saskatchewan. Reported to be 5 times brighter than the full moon and is seen in Alberta, Manitoba, and even North Dakota.
- November 26–29 – 2008 Mumbai attacks: Ten terrorists of the Lashkar-e-Taiba, a Pakistan-based terror group, carry out four days of coordinated bombing and shooting attacks across Mumbai, killing 166 people. One terrorist, Ajmal Kasab, was captured alive and executed in 2012.
- November 27 – XL Airways Germany Flight 888T. An Airbus A320 due to be redelivered to Air New Zealand stalls and crashes over Mediterranean Sea resulting the deaths of 7
- November 30 - İzmir Wildlife Park has opened.

=== December ===
- December 6 – The police shooting of 15-year-old Alexandros Grigoropulos lead to riots across Greece.
- December 10 – The Channel Island of Sark, a British Crown dependency, holds its first fully democratic elections under a new constitutional arrangement, becoming the last European territory to abolish feudalism.
- December 11 – Bernard Madoff is arrested for securities fraud after he was turned in by his sons for operating the largest Ponzi scheme in history, later known as the Madoff investment scandal.
- December 18 – The International Criminal Tribunal for Rwanda finds Théoneste Bagosora and two other senior Rwandan army officers guilty of genocide, crimes against humanity and war crimes and sentences them to life imprisonment for their role in the Rwandan genocide.
- December 22 – An ash dike ruptured at a solid waste containment area for a Tennessee Valley Authority coal-fired power plant in Roane County, Tennessee, releasing 4.2 million m^{3} (1.1 billion US gal) of coal fly ash slurry in the largest industrial spill in U.S. history.
- December 23 – A military coup d'état deposes the government of Guinea shortly after the death of longtime President Lansana Conté.
- December 27 – Israel invades the Gaza Strip, in response to rockets being fired into Israeli territory by Hamas, and due to weapons being smuggled into the area.
- December 31 – An extra leap second (23:59:60) is added to end of the year. The last time this occurred was in 2005.

=== Date unknown ===
- European Certification and Qualification Association is founded.
- National Disaster Recovery Fund, a disaster management fund is established by the Government of Jamaica.
- Tert.am, a news website was launched by Media Style LLC.

== Nobel Prizes ==

- Chemistry – Martin Chalfie, Osamu Shimomura, and Roger Y. Tsien
- Economics – Paul Krugman
- Literature – J. M. G. Le Clézio
- Peace – Martti Ahtisaari
- Physics – Makoto Kobayashi, Toshihide Maskawa, and Yoichiro Nambu
- Physiology or Medicine – Françoise Barré-Sinoussi, Harald zur Hausen, and Luc Montagnier

== See also ==
- 2008 in economics
- 2008 in politics

== Bibliography ==
- Brown, Daniel P.; Beven, John L.; Franklin, James L.; Blake, Eric S. (2010). "Atlantic Hurricane Season of 2008". Monthly Weather Review. 138 (5): 1975–2001. doi:10.1175/2009MWR3174.1. ISSN 1520-0493.
- Harbom, Lotta; Wallensteen, Peter (2009). "Armed Conflicts, 1946–2008". Journal of Peace Research. 46 (4): 577–587. doi:10.1177/0022343309339112. ISSN 0022-3433. JSTOR 25654437.
- Lea, Adam; Saunders, Mark (January 8, 2009). Summary of 2008 NW Pacific Typhoon Season and Verification of Authors' Seasonal Forecasts (PDF). Tropical Storm Risk (Report). University College London. Archived (PDF) from the original on June 17, 2025.
- Annual 2008 Global Climate Report (Report). National Oceanic and Atmospheric Administration. 2009. Archived from the original on September 16, 2025.
- Podelco, Grant (December 31, 2008). "2008 In Review: Top 10 News Stories Of The Year". Radio Free Europe/Radio Liberty. Archived from the original on September 28, 2016.
- Time Annual 2009. Time. 2009. ISBN 978-1-60320-047-9.
- World Population Prospects 2024 (Report). United Nations Department of Economic and Social Affairs. 2024. Archived from the original on October 27, 2025.
- World Economic Situation and Prospects 2009 (PDF) (Report). United Nations Department of Economic and Social Affairs. 2009. ISBN 9789211560480.
- 2008 Global Trends (Report). United Nations High Commissioner for Refugees. 2009.
