= NDRF =

NDRF may refer to:

- National Defense Reserve Fleet, consists of "mothballed" ships used to provide shipping for the United States during national emergencies
- National Design & Research Forum, a forum of the Institution of Engineers (India)
- National Disaster Recovery Framework, a document released by the Federal Emergency Management Agency in the United States
- National Disaster Recovery Fund, a disaster recovery fund based in Jamaica
- National Disaster Response Force, a disaster response agency of the Republic of India
