= Long grain =

Long grain may refer to:

- Long grain (wood), wood grain that runs parallel to the longitudinal axis of the piece
- Long grain (rice), rice that is high in amylose and tends to remain intact after cooking

== See also ==
- Short grain (disambiguation)
