= Sabanekh =

Spinach stew eaten in Egypt and the Levant

Sabanekh سبانخ
- Place of origin: Egypt and the Levant
- Main ingredients: Spinach, onion, tomato

Sabanekh (Arabic: سبانخ, lit. 'spinach') is a spinach stew eaten in Egypt and the Levant, with some variations depending on the country. In Egypt it is cooked in a savory tomato-based sauce, often accompanied by rice or bread. It is regarded as a highly nutritious meal and is a staple in Egyptian cuisine.

== Preparation ==
In Egypt the preparation of sabanekh begins with thoroughly washing and finely chopping fresh spinach leaves. In a pot, finely chopped onions are sautéed in olive oil until they become translucent. Minced garlic is then added and cooked until fragrant. Tomato paste and diced tomatoes are incorporated, cooking for several minutes to develop a rich base. Vegetable stock is poured in, and the mixture is brought to a gentle boil. Seasonings such as ground coriander, cumin, salt, and black pepper are added to enhance the flavors. The chopped spinach is then introduced into the pot, stirred until wilted, and simmered on low heat for 10-15 minutes to allow the flavors to meld. A sprinkle of freshly chopped cilantro is added before serving. Sabanekh is traditionally served over short-grain rice or alongside warm bread.

Variations of the Egyptian dish may include the addition of ground meat, such as beef or lamb, which is browned and seasoned before being combined with the spinach and tomato mixture. This adds a richer flavor and makes the dish more filling.

== See also ==
- Egyptian cuisine
- List of Middle Eastern dishes
- List of African dishes
