= One million voices against FARC =

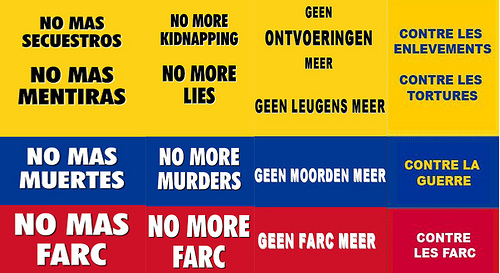
Image used in the marches against the FARC on February 4, 2008

A million voices against the FARC (in Spanish: Un millón de voces contra las FARC), also called the February 4 march was a name of several civic mobilizations in different parts of the world under the slogan Colombia soy yo (translated into English as Colombia is me) that took place on February 4, 2008, in which they protested against the actions of the FARC. These mobilizations arose in January 2008 from the social network Facebook where a group of users was created in reaction to the situation of the hostages evidenced in the survival tests delivered by the guerrilla group in December 2007 and the failure of Operation Emmanuel. This Facebook group grew exponentially in the first weeks of 2008 since it was the only one that at that time referred to those events that generated strong feelings of rejection in Colombia.

This phenomenon became the focus of attention of the media, which in turn were the ones that summoned the large number of participants. These marches are part of a series of civic expressions around the cause of peace in Colombia and against crimes such as kidnapping and other forms of violence that plague the country. Due to the novelty of the emergence of the event, some political analysts perceived that some kind of long-term civic movement would emerge from it, over the months these perceptions were denied.

== Development ==
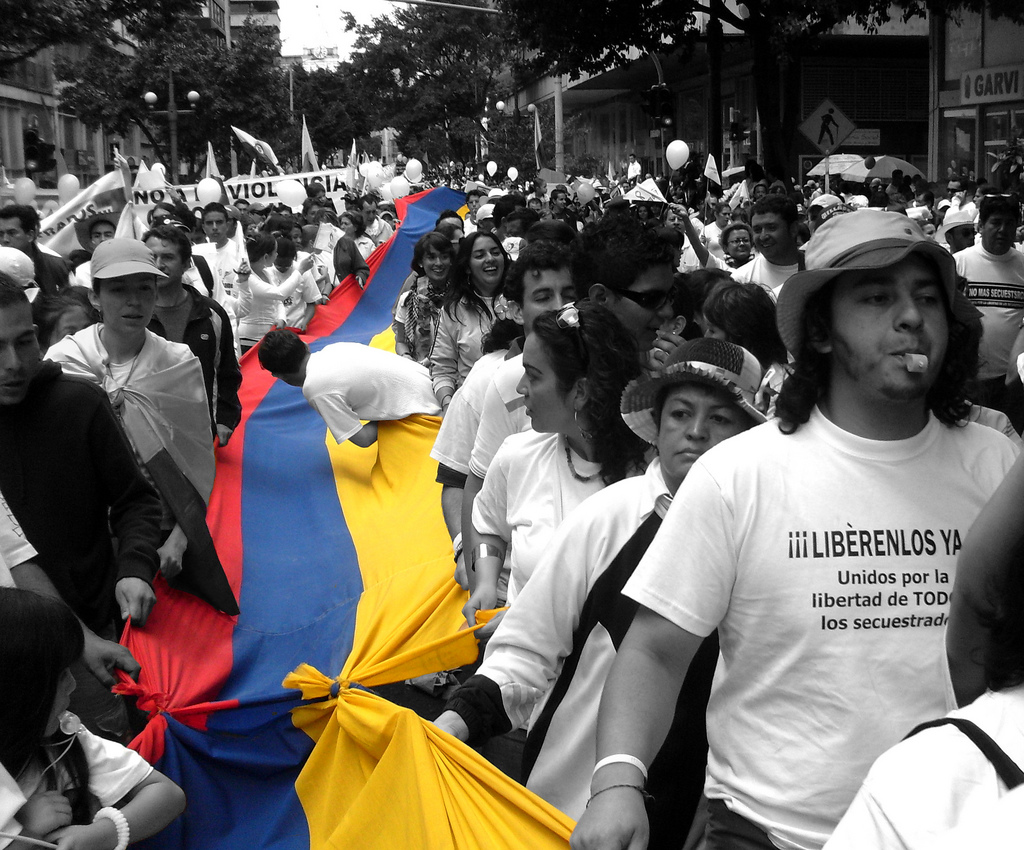
Participants in the march carrying a Colombian flag

On February 4, 2008, protest marches were held, in which close to 6 million people participated in different cities of Colombia and the world. The call for these marches began on the Internet and spread to the media. The idea of holding a march and its organization arose from a Facebook group created to reject the mistreatment to which the hostages were being subjected and to show indignation at the failed Operation Emmanuel.

The phenomenon arose at the beginning of January 2008 when, thanks to the reception given to the Facebook group, in less than 3 days it managed to unite more than 10,000 users. Meanwhile, Oscar Morales, Carlos Andrés Santiago, Rosa Cristina Parra, Álvaro González, Pierre Onzaga, Cristina Lucena and other young people organized themselves to express their rejection of the acts of violence and terrorism committed by the FARC, such as attacks with car bomb, the recruitment of children, the planting of antipersonnel mines, the forced displacement, the massacres perpetrated and the kidnapping of thousands of Colombians and foreigners by the FARC, which at the time had kidnapped more than 750 civilians and soldiers for several years. After a few days the Facebook group had gathered around 250,000 users supporting the cause according to sources from the group itself.

The mobilizations carried out had the support of the Colombian government, the media, as well as different public personalities, such as the recently released Clara Rojas, members of the opposition and some spokespersons for the paramilitary groups (although these support were rejected by the organizers of the march).

The march managed to convene millions of people in all regions of the country and in various countries abroad, repeating the slogan "No más FARC" (in English: "No more FARC"). According to press reports, the march on February 4 surpassed the march organized by the País Libre Foundation in 1996. Some experts believe that this fact was due to the fact that the call was made over the Internet, but in reality the massive convocation was carried out by traditional media with messages that permeated a population hypersensitive to the news of the kidnapped.

However, during the march there were frictions between people who defended different points of view and the organizers, as happened in Paris (France), where there was a strong discussion between some organizers and participants of the event. The discussion arose around a banner alluding to the crimes of the paramilitaries and other criminal organizations.

In the Plaza de Bolívar in Bogotá there were attempts at verbal confrontation between different groups of people. The burning of banners and harangues against the ideas and movements defended by other attendees at the event took place. During the event, the strong polarization between the positions that advocated sending a message to a single armed actor and those who considered that this led to an unfair bias or that the march had a political background became evident support for the government.

According to the Colombian newspaper El Tiempo, the march "against the FARC" took place in 193 cities in Colombia and the world. The call was extended throughout the country and was also supported in different cities of the world, in some of them they were supported by the Uribe government through the consulates and embassies to prevent the marches from being affected by the legislation of each country.

The most numerous international gatherings took place in cities in the United States as well as in different European countries such as Spain and France, and in some Latin American countries. However, the highest concentration of people occurred in Bogotá, where it exceeded one million people.

== Controversy ==
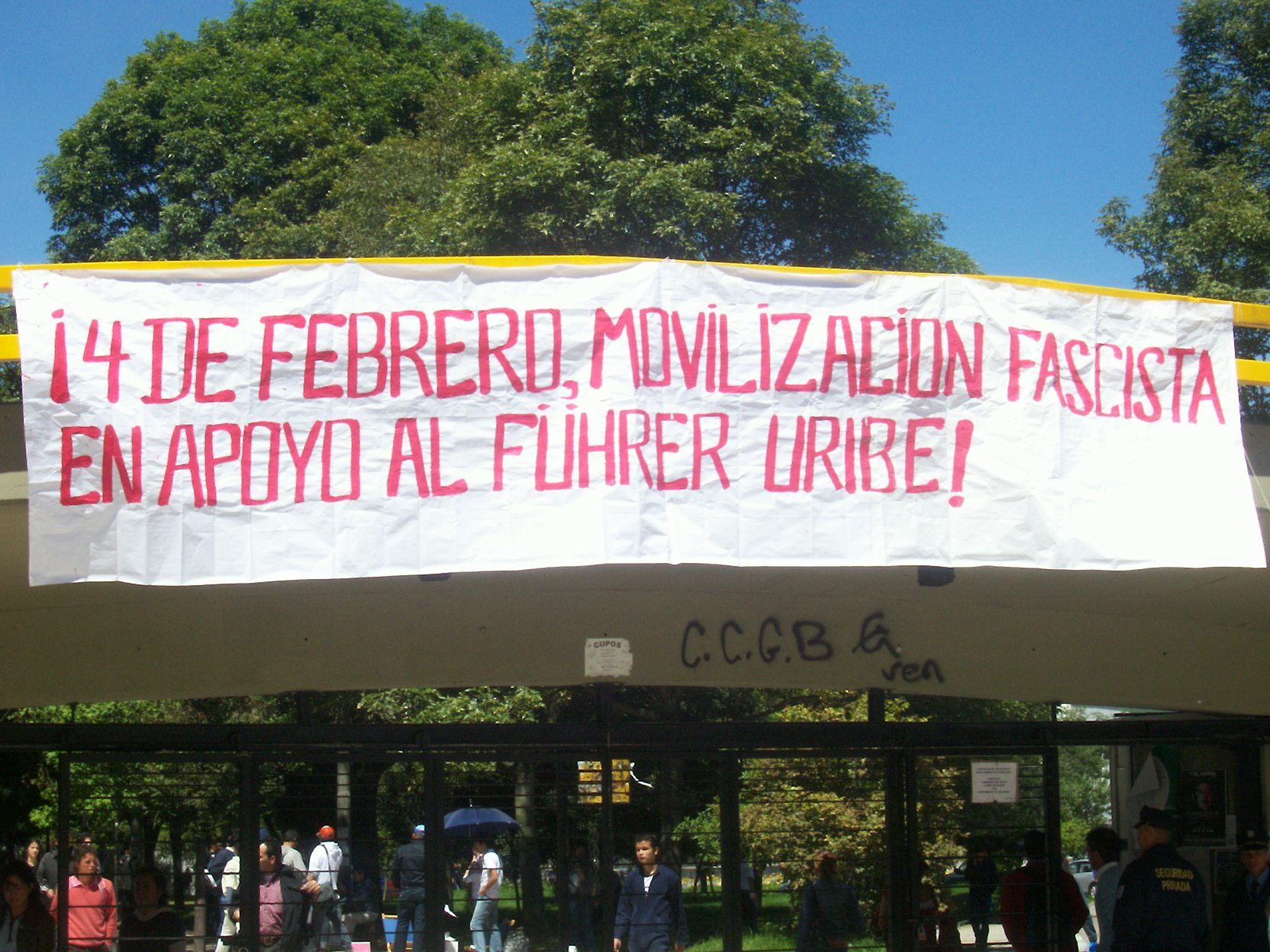
Poster against the march and President Uribe at the National University in Bogotá

The opposition party, Polo Democrático Alternativo (PDA), made a call for mobilization different from the march, calling for a concentration in the Plaza de Bolívar, 2 hours before the initial mobilization, which was supported by different social organizations and unions and by the mayor of Bogotá, Samuel Moreno, who also belonged to the PDA. Said concentration manifested itself in favor of the humanitarian agreement and against kidnapping and war. The party leadership argued that all forms of violence should be rejected and not only those of the FARC, adding that the march could be used politically by President Álvaro Uribe. This position caused polemics and controversies even within the same party.

=== Criticism of relatives of kidnapped ===
Several relatives of people kidnapped by the FARC, particularly former congressmen who hoped they would be released soon (as was the case at the end of February), criticized the approach given by the organizers to the protest marches against the FARC. According to Ángela de Pérez, wife of former parliamentarian Luis Eladio Pérez, this call was not entirely positive in the sense of the focus that was given to it. They preferred that the march was for the humanitarian agreement but not against the FARC.

In the same way, Íngrid Betancourt's sister, Astrid Betancourt, criticized the march and opposed it, arguing that it was supported by paramilitary groups and manipulated by the government. This statement was rejected by the organizers of the march and by various sectors of opinion. However, after his release, former congressman Orlando Beltrán Cuéllar indicated that the FARC were not indifferent to the mobilization on February 4 and that this had an impact on his release and that of three of his companions.

=== March 6 March ===
After the 4 February demonstration, a group of victims of the paramilitaries led by Iván Cepeda, son of the murdered senator of the Patriotic Union, Manuel Cepeda Vargas, called for a mobilization of support for the victims of the paramilitary groups and of state crimes, held on March 6, 2008.

The presidential advisor José Obdulio Gaviria stated that he would not support it, arguing that it was called by the FARC and that the paramilitaries were in the process of demobilization. Other critics of the 6M march that called not to march were Fernando Londoño, Plinio Apuleyo Mendoza and the journalist Rafael Nieto Loaiza, who according to the Colombian magazine Semana defend political right and extreme right positions respectively.

Before the demonstration, the New Colombia News Agency (ANNCOL) had announced its support for the M6 march. Iván Cepeda expressed that his movement rejects any support from groups outside the law, and criticized the government for not rejecting the support of the paramilitaries for the February 4 march. The demobilized paramilitary chiefs, through the Movimiento Nacional de Autodefensas Demobilizadas, said that the March 6 March was intended to delegitimize the public's rejection of the FARC. However, the most notorious paramilitary chief in prison, Salvatore Mancuso, departed from this position and announced his support for the march on his website, support that was also rejected by the organizers of the march.

The Colombian government did not support the initiative. The march was held in a mostly peaceful manner, although attended by a small number of Colombians.
