= 2008 in economics =

The following economics-related events occurred in 2008.

== Events ==
=== October ===
- October 5
  - The German government moves to back troubled Hypo Real Estate with a 50 billion euro rescue plan. (MarketWatch)
  - German Chancellor Angela Merkel announces that Germany will explicitly guarantee the deposits in banks held by its citizens. (MarketWatch)
- October 9
  - Iceland nationalises Kaupthing Bank.
  - IMF: World on brink of recession; prepares special loan program.
  - Markets down across the world; Dow Jones falls below 9,000.
- October 10
  - Hampshire councils have £3 million invested in Icelandic banks.
  - Dow Jones recovers hundreds of points, before losing them in minutes.
  - Global markets plunge.
  - WTO calls meeting on trade finance and economic crisis.
- October 11
  - G7 says "all available tools" will be used to solve crisis.
  - October 11: Iceland and United Kingdom in diplomatic dispute over financial crisis.
  - October 11: George W. Bush attempts to reassure Americans in radio address.
