= Short grain =

Short grain may refer to:

- Short grain (wood), wood grain that deviates from the longitudinal axis
- Short grain (rice), sticky rice that allows the rice to hold its shape when cooked

== See also ==
- Long grain (disambiguation)
