= International Year of the Potato =

United Nations observation in 2008

The year 2008 was declared the International Year of the Potato by the United Nations, noting that the potato is a staple food in the diet of the world's population, and affirming the need to focus world attention on the role that the potato can play in providing food security and eradicating poverty. Food and Agriculture Organization was invited to facilitate its implementation.

The corresponding resolution adopted on 25 November 2005 by the Food and Agriculture Organization, which was to facilitate the implementation of the year, affirmed "the need to revive public awareness of the relationship that exists between poverty, food security, malnutrition and the potential contribution of the potato to defeating hunger."

This was one of many international observances declared for specific days, months and years. The year 2008 was shared with the International Year of Sanitation.

It was hoped that International Year designation would do for the potato what the International Year of Rice (2004) did for that food staple, namely, inspire exhibits, educational programs, films, publications and greater public awareness of multi-national efforts on behalf of our food resources. The year 2008 was also designated the National Year of the Potato in Peru.

On May 30th 2024 the first International Potato Day was held to focus on the contribution of the potato to the lives of producers and consumers with the theme: Harvesting diversity, feeding hope. (See external link, below)

== See also ==
- International Year of Pulses
- International Year of Quinoa
