= International Year of Rice =

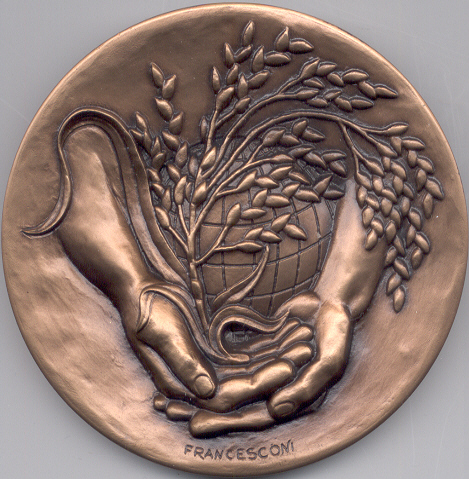
FAO Calendar 2004 Bronze Obverse

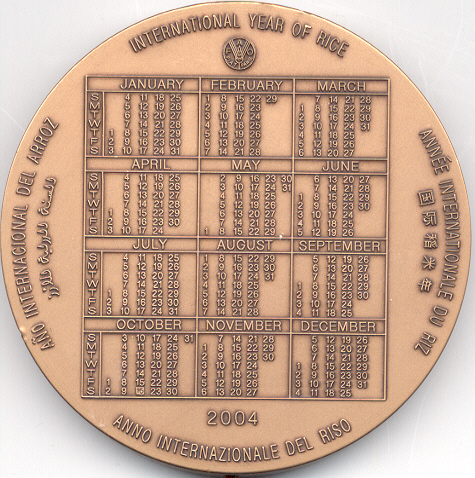
FAO Calendar 2004 Bronze Reverse

The year 2004 was declared the International Year of Rice by the United Nations, noting that rice is a staple food for more than half the world's population, and affirming the need to heighten awareness of the role of rice in alleviating poverty and malnutrition.

This is one of many International observances declared for specific days, months and years. The year 2008 was declared the International Year of the Potato.
