= European Certification and Qualification Association =

- Formation: July 2008
- Type: not-for-profit
- Purpose: Unify the certification processes
- Location: Krems, Austria
- Website: ecqa.org

The European Certification and Qualification Association is a not-for-profit association that aims to unify the certification processes for various professions. It is joining institutions and thousands of professionals from all over Europe and abroad. The ECQA offers the certification of participants for numerous professions. Currently, 30 professions are active and some new professions are currently being developed. ECQA services are being offered in 24 countries across Europe by 60 ECQA members. The ECQA is also enhancing its activities by expanding to all over the world (e.g. USA, Thailand, India etc.).

The ECQA ensures that the same knowledge is presented to participants across Europe and all participants are tested according to the same requirements (quality criteria). Knowledge to be provided and tested for certain professions are defined by experts from industry and research, who know best what the requirements of the market are and what the state of the art knowledge is within certain domains. These experts work in ECQA groups called Job Role Committees. The EQCA coordinates their work and provides the infrastructure and IT support.

The ECQA has developed a set of quality criteria, which are used for the certification of the following types of service providers: trainers, training organizations, exam organizations, and certification organizations. The aim is to ensure the same level of training and certification quality in all participating countries.
