= National Design & Research Forum =

Indian research organization

National Design & Research Foundation (NDRF) is a premier Indian research and development organization promoting collaborative interdisciplinary research and development. It is actively involved in Technological Research, Design, Development, Productization, Innovation, and Program Management of large, interdisciplinary Indian Technological Research Programs.

NDRF was established in June 1967 by the Institution of Engineers (India), as an autonomous forum for technological research and development. It was formerly known as the National Design Engineering Forum. It is located in Bengaluru, Karnataka, India.

NDRF's collaborative research ecosystem-NDRF Consortium has over 80 partners from the academia, industry, and research organizations; and has progressed 32 research projects.

Currently, Space Scientist Dr. Annadurai M, serves as the chairman, board of governors, NDRF. Defence Scientist Dr.V.Dillibabu is the Director of NDRF from June 2019.

== NDRF -Consortium partner ==
1. Agargami Applied Aeronautics

Activities

•Research and Development

- Micro, Nano, and Bio Systems
- Medical Device Development for Affordable Healthcare
- Interfacing Biology and Engineering
- Sensors and Sensors for Societal applications including Chemical, Biomimetic and Biosensors
- National Programme on Micro air vehicles (NP-MICAV)
- System Identification Group-Flapping Wing MICAVs
- Development of Fuel Cells
- Rapid Prototyping and Tooling

•Research Infrastructure and Laboratories as National Resource Facilities

- ProtoLab-Rapid Prototyping Laboratory
- Central Integrated Systems Laboratory-systems engineering, and design of multidisciplinary systems by simulation
- Technical Facility for NP-MICAV

•Knowledge-sharing and Networking

- National and International Flying Competitions for MICAVs
- Organizing premier technological networking and collaborative sessions to bring professionals and researchers from different disciplines of engineering on a common platform

•Monographs on Contemporary Technologies

•Design Awards-National Design Awards and Student Design Awards

Contribution

NDRF success stories span

•Development of Interdisciplinary Technologies-biosensors for detection of explosives and gases, bio-fuel cells and folding wing technologies for micro air vehicles, innovative technologies for developing affordable blood pressure measurement devices

•Products-micro brushless outrunner motors for micro air vehicles, non-invasive glucometer using innovative technologies

•Patents and Intellectual Property
