= ANNCOL =

Swedish news agency

ANNCOL (Agencia de Noticias Nueva Colombia, "New Colombia News Agency") is a non-commercial alternative news agency based in Stockholm, Sweden. It was founded in 1996 by Latin American and European journalists and maintains intermittently a web portal since May, 1998. Its aims are "... to inform about Colombia... to be a voice for the voiceless sectors of Colombia and to provide a platform for ... actions of popular movements, trade unions and the progressive communities of the Latin American countries... that are fighting against neoliberalism and the exploitation of the people".

== Controversy about ANNCOL ==
The Colombian Government has warned repeatedly that humanitarian organizations should avoid any "mediation" contact with the FARC without having official permission from the Colombian government. In the past the governments of several European countries, Venezuela and the Roman Catholic Church have gotten such permissions with mixed results.

The Colombian government accuses ANNCOL of supporting the Revolutionary Armed Forces of Colombia, FARC, something that ANNCOL denies vehemently. Colombian President Álvaro Uribe has declared "What worries me is an advance of science, as important as Internet is, being used by terrorism... To those individuals at ANNCOL, that manage an Internet page, being them either here in Colombia or in foreign countries, in Europe, the answer I have for them is that we're going to procure to put them in jail...one of those bandits in ANNCOL is more guilty than farmers, misled by guerrillas, who are guarding and torturing those who have been kidnapped." In 2007, just one week before the elections, President Uribe accused Samuel Moreno, then candidate and now elected mayor of Bogotá, of receiving support from the "FARC Internet pages", stating that "I am very worried that these FARC terrorists, in its Internet page are supporting candidacies". President Uribe later had to apologize to Mr. Moreno.

The Colombian magazine Revista Semana and ANNCOL have interchanged editorial articles, criticizing each other. While Semana accepted that ANNCOL was founded by "political expatriates of the Patriotic Union, UP", a political organization born from peace talks with FARC in the mid-1980s and exterminated by paramilitaries a few years later, and that its web page was "one of the fifteen most visited Colombian pages", it also claimed that ANNCOL was a part of a concerted effort by guerrilla members to "promote a political campaign in favor of FARC and against the government... increase pressure of UE on Uribe's government for an exchange of prisoners and kidnapped persons under FARC conditions... convince UE governments to suppress military support by denouncing links between the Colombian Army and the United Self-Defense Forces of Colombia... spread its ideology and its own version of Colombian history... and infiltrate similar organizations... to use them as platforms." According to Semana, Raul Reyes seized computer contains information that shows that FARC is represented in the editorial team of ANNCOL and that provides it with financial support. Ironically, this has not stopped members of the Colombian government from claiming that Semana joins ANNCOL because both publications "insist in a conceptual war against President Álvaro Uribe... when they affirm that in Colombia there is a civil war instead of terrorist violence".

Documentation captured in a FARC terrorist camp revealed that a Danish citizen referred to as 'Carlos Mono' was responsible for getting the legal permit for the news agency in Sweden. [EL TIEMPO, 02-07-2008].

Dick Emanuelsson, one of the ANNCOL journalists mentioned by Semana, rejected those accusations, stating that the Colombian government had paid journalists working for the military. Mr. Emanuelsson explained that some of the interviews, that were the source of accusations about his links with FARC members, have been offered by him to Semana prior to its publishing in Café Stereo or ANNCOL. Café Stereo, the Jaime Pardo Leal Association, the Bolivarian Press Agency in Italy, Rural Press in Denmark, and the New Colombia Alternative Information Group in Germany were accused in the same Semana article of "being pro-Farc news sites".

== Site blocking and return ==
ANNCOL domain name has changed through the years, keeping the domain name prefix "anncol" but changing the top level domain from .uk, .org, .eu and most recently, .info.

Colombian Vicepresident Francisco Santos Calderón complained in public about ANNCOL website in 2002 when visiting Stockholm. In 2003 ANNCOL changed the location of its website from Sweden to Denmark. ANNCOL complained about the "persecution" by the Colombian ambassadors in Sweden Fernando Sanclemente and Carlos Holmes Trujillo. In 2004, the president of the supporting local Danish organization faced terrorist charges for having publicly invited Danes to raise funds for the Colombian guerrillas by buying T-shirts with FARC logo emblazoned.

Café Stereo and ANNCOL have reported that the Colombian government has been involved in some service interruptions. After the Colombian Ministry of Defense complained to Dell about their adds being shown on ANNCOL page by Google AdSense, Dell executives mentioned in their declarations that ANNCOL site has been blocked for the entire country of Colombia: "You have anncol.org, which is the page that is blocked in Colombia, and this is the one where FARC publishes its communiques. There is also anncol.com and anncol.nu, it is there where our links appear".

A Danish investigation into ANNCOL's alleged FARC links was temporarily closed in 2005.

On April 23 of 2011, the Colombian Joaquín Pérez Becerra was arrested in Venezuela . He was identified as the founder and director of ANNCOL. After his subsequent extradition to Colombia, ANNCOL web site was blocked by the government of Sweden. As revealed the seized computers of Raul Reyes, Pérez Becerra was on the payroll of FARC and he's presumed to be an organic member of FARC and to provide logistical support to the Colombian guerrilla.

Anncol returned in May 2011 with the new homepage anncol.info.
