= Easyswap =

Switzerland based online local exchange trading system platform

Easyswap is a Switzerland-based on-line local exchange trading system (LETS) platform featuring geolocation data as well as a complementary currency.

== History ==
Easyswap began as an initiative of the city of Lausanne, Switzerland, to reduce social problems such as long-term unemployment and social exclusion.

A working group, made up of welfare recipients recruited by the city's social services department, came up with the idea of a web-based project modeled on local exchange trading systems (LETS). Their project was to serve two purposes: promote social inclusion by nurturing contacts between different societal groups and encourage the sustainable consumption of consumer goods.

Administered by an eponymous non profit association, easyswap.org was officially launched in October, 2008.

In August 2011, a version of the easyswap platform was developed for the University of Lausanne.

== The Swap ==
The swap is a virtual, complementary currency in use on the easyswap platform. The swap has a "theoretical value" of one Swiss franc and cannot be bought or sold using any other currency. Its value is determined by individual members who are free to set their own prices.

== Swap 'n' roll ==
The easyswap platform uses an open source technology based on PHP5 Zend Framework developed and maintained by Swap 'n' roll.

Other open source LETS platforms include Cyclos, WebLETS and Cclite.
