= National Disaster Recovery Fund =

The National Disaster Recovery Fund is a disaster management fund established by the Government of Jamaica in 2008 following the extensive damage done to the island of Jamaica following Hurricane Gustav. The fund is intended to improve and enhance the efficiency of healthcare, emergency services, and education in Jamaica.

The Jamaican ambassador to the United States, Anthony Johnson appealed to the Jamaican diaspora in the United States to support the National Disaster Recovery Fund, following the major damage caused during the passage of Hurricane Gustav. Johnson spoke at the RFK Stadium in Washington D.C. on September 7, 2008, at a Reggae Fest saying, "I am appealing to you all, to assist Jamaica in its recovery process by contributing financially to the National Disaster Recovery Fund (NDRF). I am sure that many of you here have relatives back in Jamaica who were affected by the tropical storm and who are in need of your help at this time."
