= Rice as food =

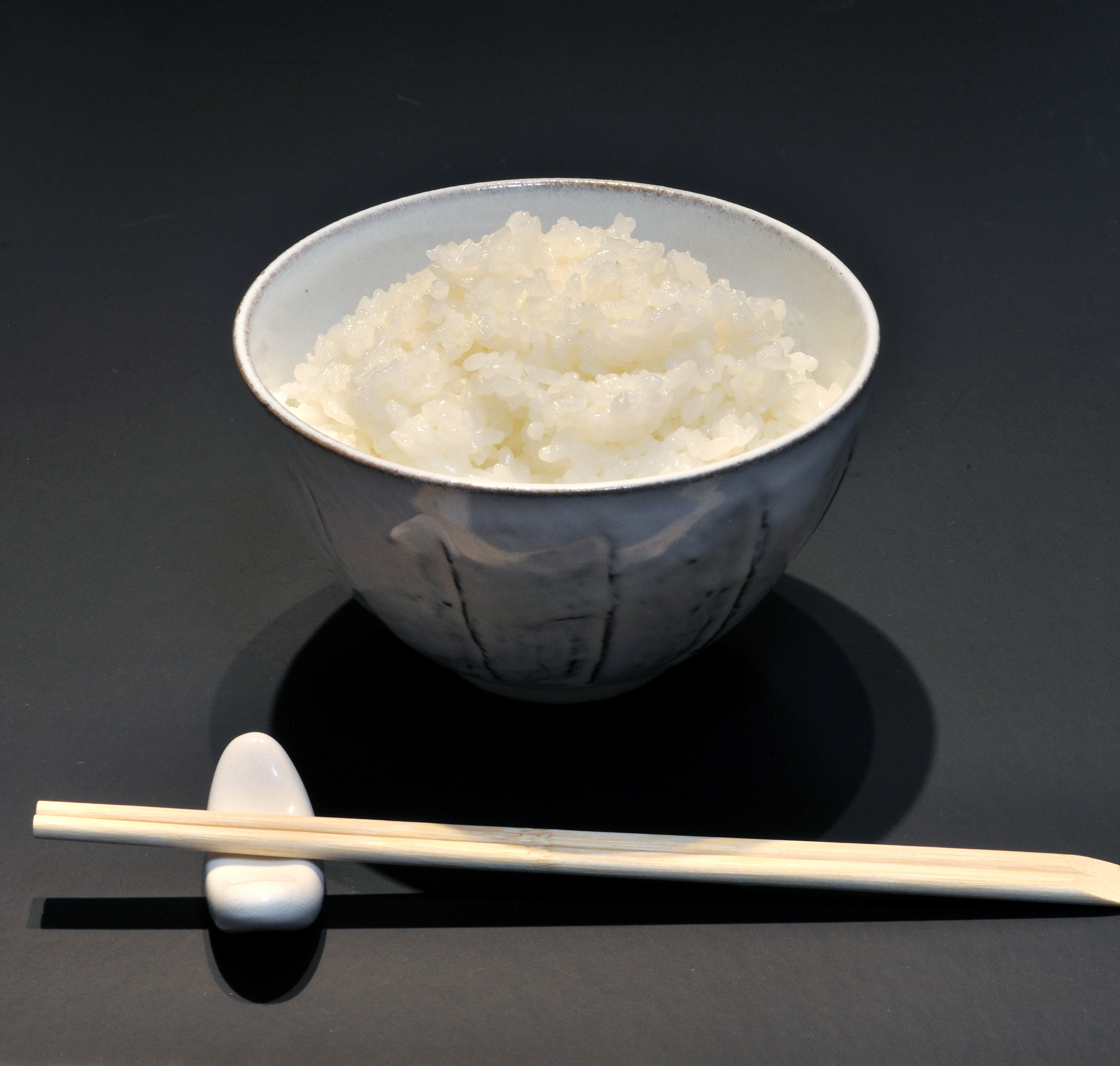
A bowl of cooked rice, ready to be eaten.

Rice is commonly consumed as food around the world. It occurs in long-, medium-, and short-grained types. It is the staple food of over half the world's population.

Hazards associated with rice consumption include arsenic from the soil, and Bacillus cereus which can grow in poorly-stored cooked rice, and cause food poisoning.

== Types ==
The varieties of rice are typically classified as long-, medium-, and short-grained. Long-grain rice is high in amylose and tends to remain intact after cooking. Some varieties of long-grain rice that are high in amylopectin, known as Thai Sticky rice, are usually steamed. Medium-grain rice is high in amylopectin and becomes more sticky. Medium-grain rice is used for sweet dishes, for risotto in Italy, and many rice dishes, such as arròs negre, in Spain. Short-grain rice is stickier and allows the rice to hold its shape when cooked. Short-grain rice is used extensively in Japan, including sushi and to accompany savoury dishes. Short-grain rice is often used for rice pudding.

Independent of grain length and starchiness, rice can also be differentiated by traits such as aroma and pigmentation (red, black). So-called wild rice, which are close cousins of domesticated rice, are not usually included in this classification.

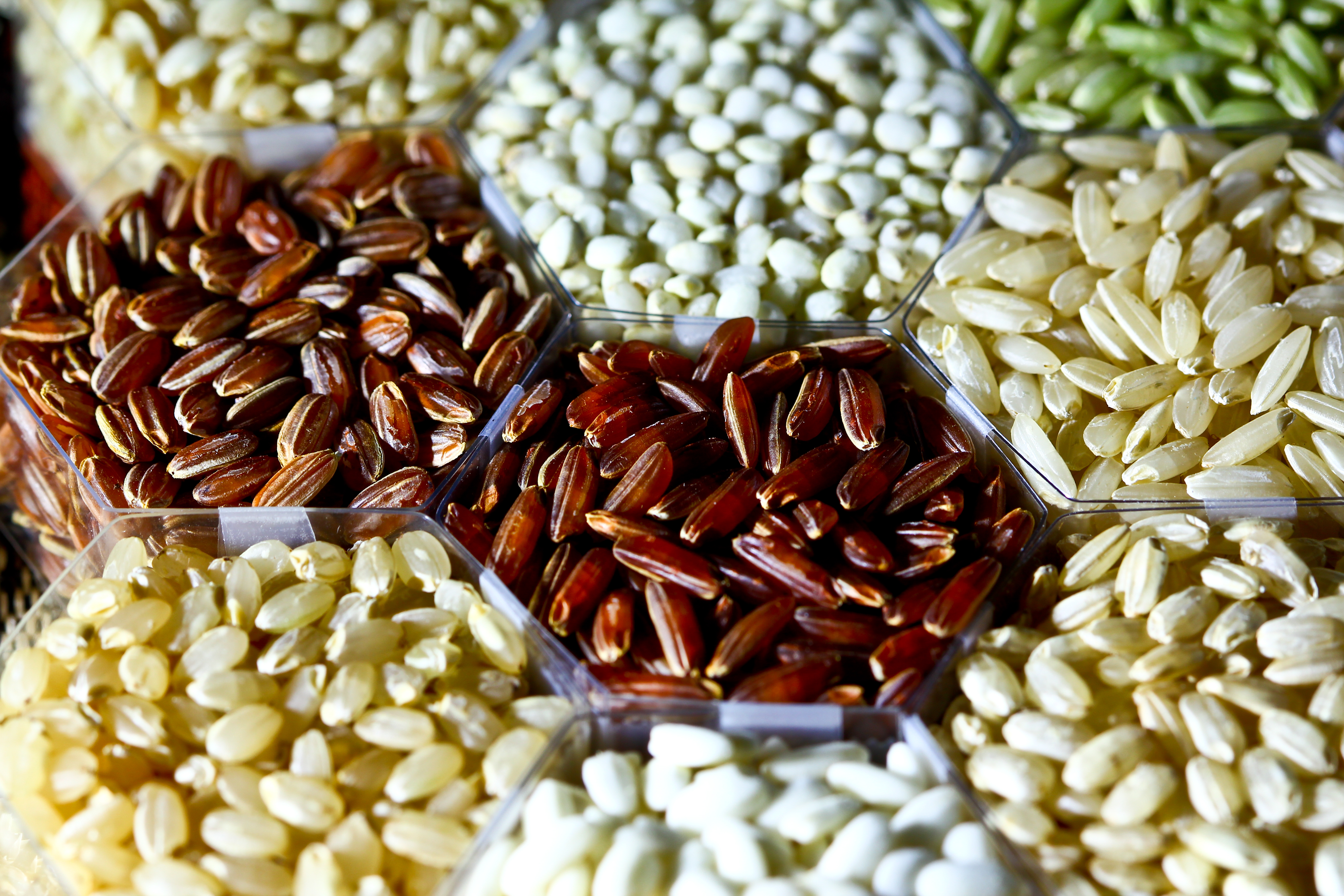
Rice comes in many shapes, colors, and sizes

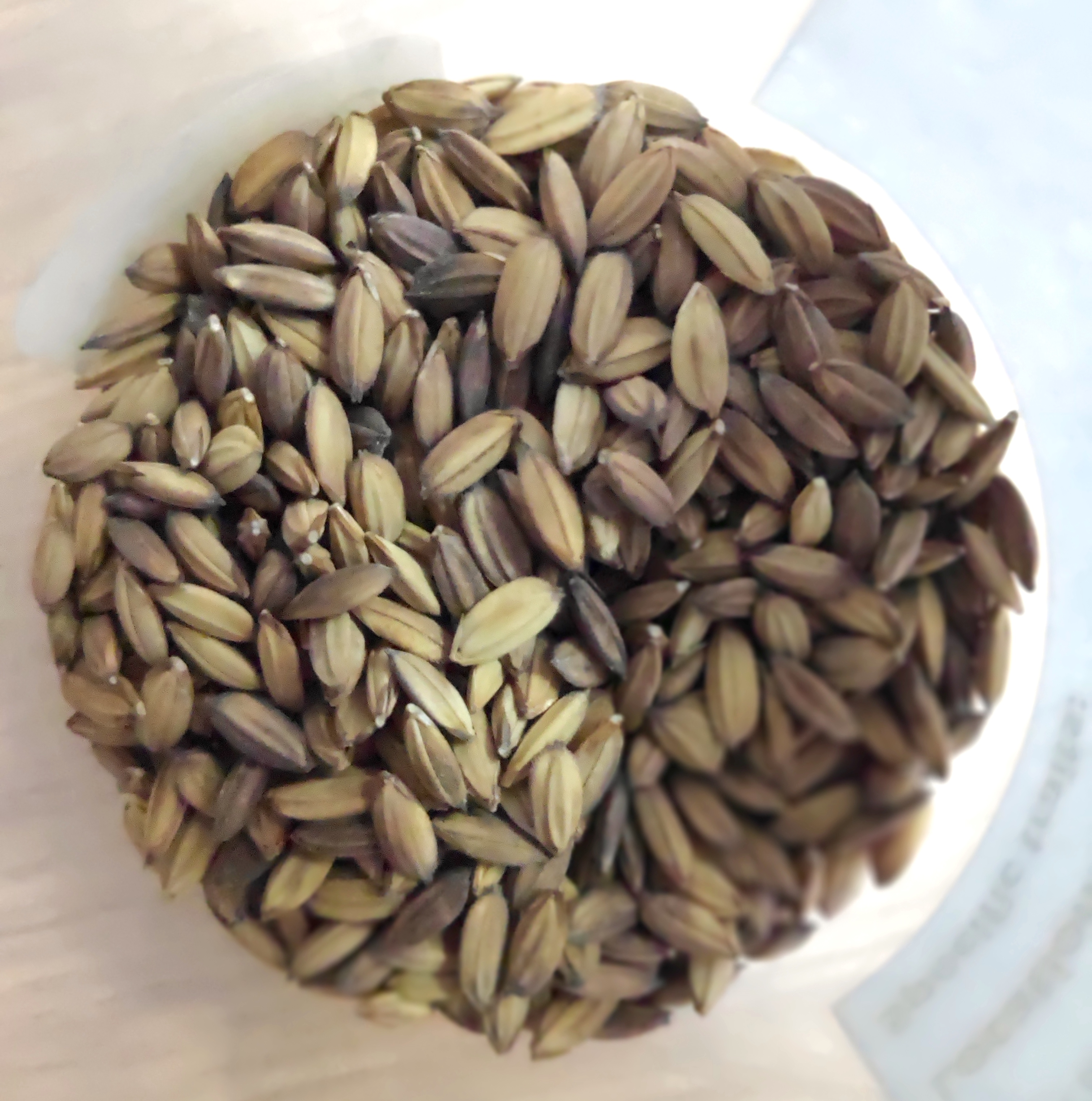
Jumli Marshi rice, unhulled, Nepal

Rice also differs by the processing applied to it. Rice starts as whole seeds with inedible rice hulls; removing the hull by milling produces brown rice. Polishing produces first rice with germ, then white rice. Cooking white rice then drying produces instant rice, though there is a significant degradation in taste and texture. Parboiled rice is different from instant rice: parboiled rice is first part-cooked with the husk before milling.

Rice flour and starch often are used in batters and breadings to increase crispiness.

Rice processing
A: Rice with chaff
B: Brown rice
C: Rice with germ
D: White rice with bran residue
E: Polished
(1): Chaff
(2): Bran
(3): Bran residue
(4): Cereal germ
(5): Endosperm

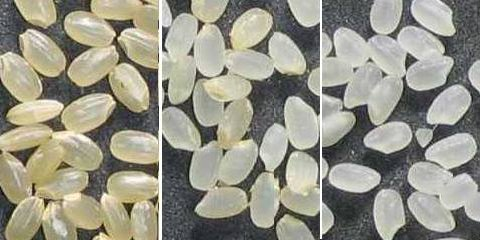
Unmilled to milled Japanese rice, from left to right, brown rice, rice with germ, white rice

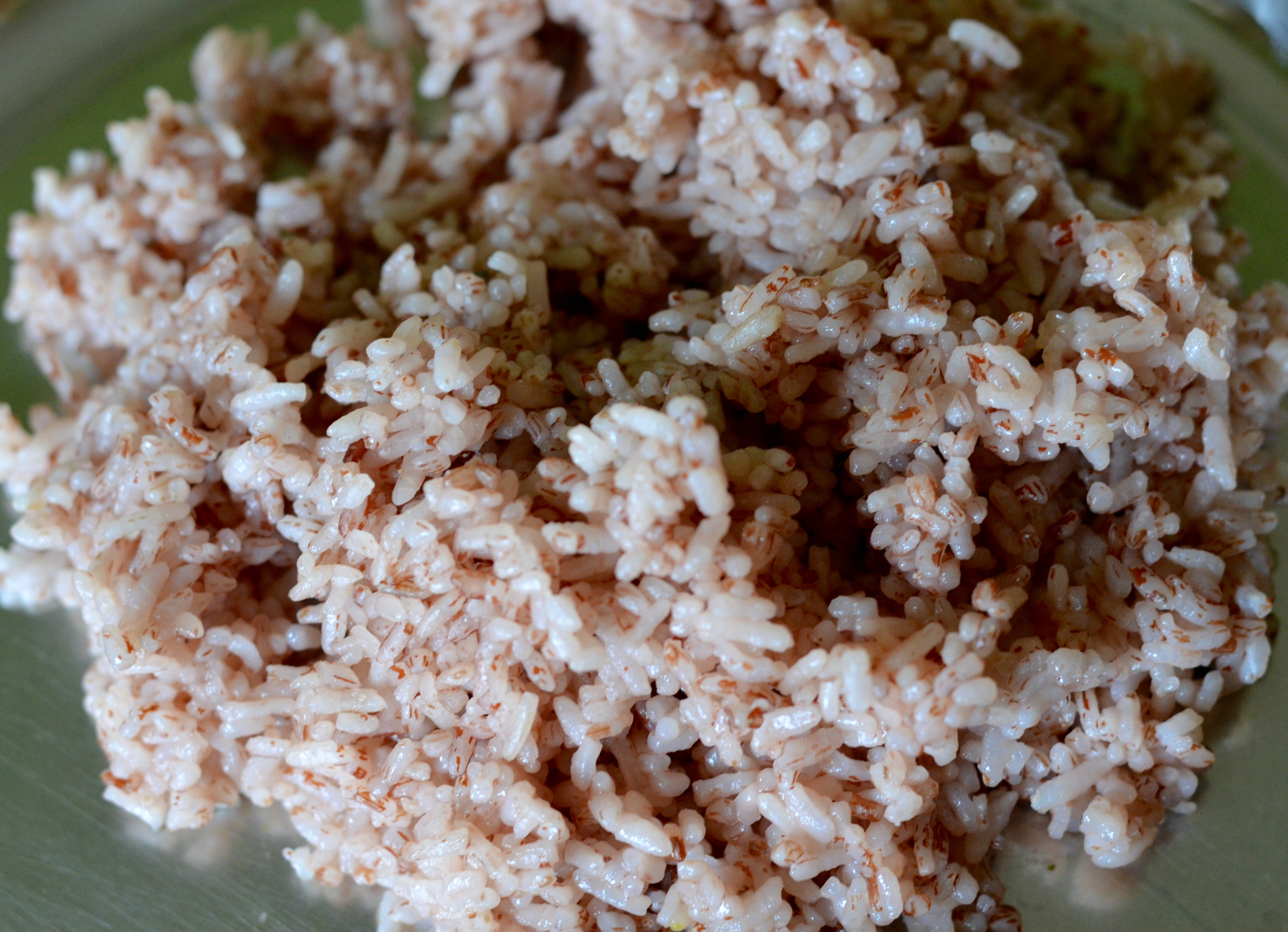
Cooked brown rice, Bhutan

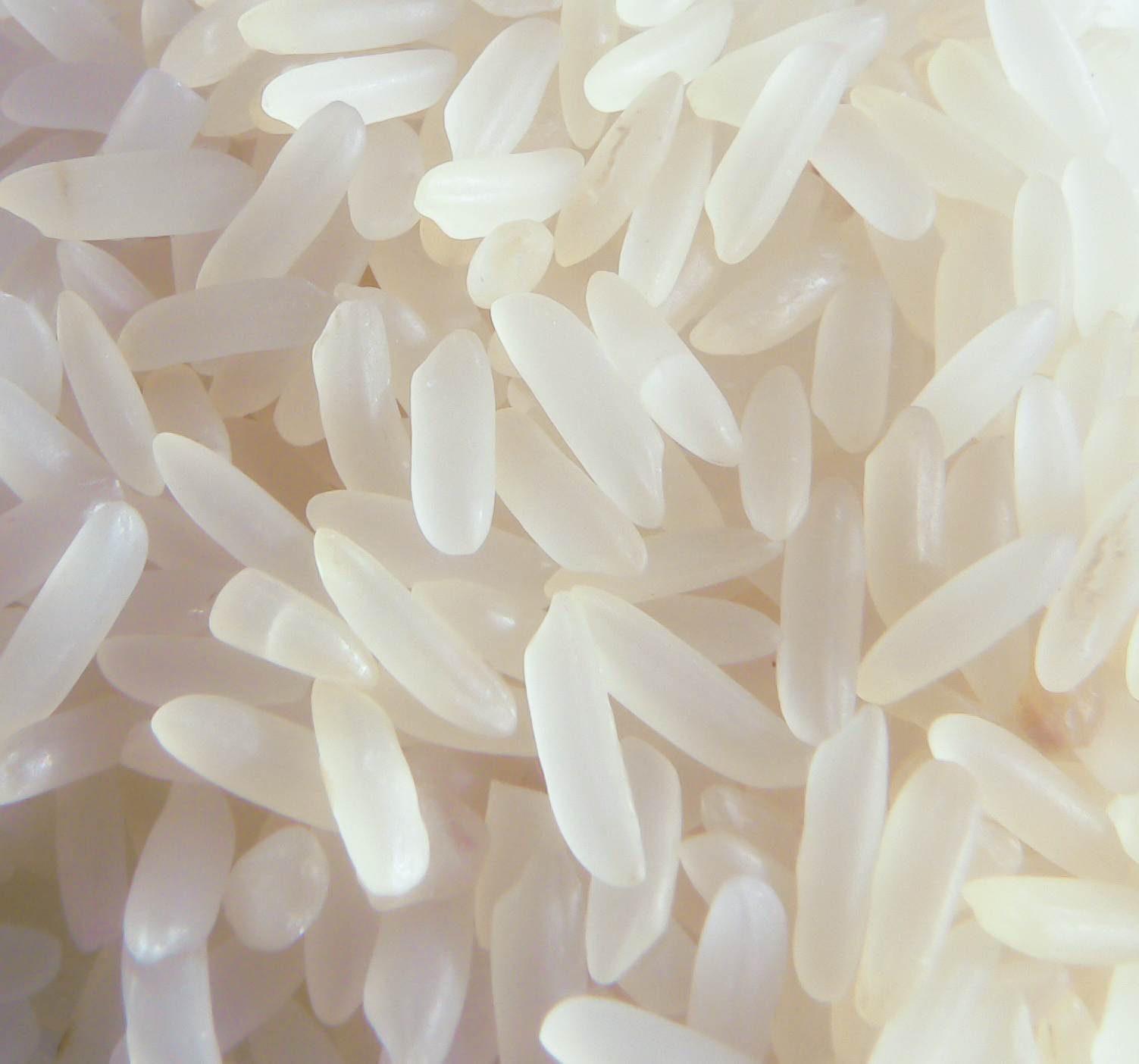
Cooked white rice

== Taste factors ==
The two main components and determinants of taste in rice are starch and protein. 80-90% of the weight of an uncooked rice grain is starch, and 7-10% is protein. Other important components of rice include fat, fibers, and minerals, all comprising less than 1% of rice by weight.

The ratio of the two types of starch, linear amylose and branched amylopectin, affects cooked rice texture. Rice is mostly amylopectin, with amylose making up only 0-30% of the total starch. Amylopectin chains form double helices with each other and encourage crystallization, which raises the peak viscosity and starch gelatinization ability of cooked rice, meaning higher amylopectin content in rice will lead to a stickier cooked product. Gelatinization is also inhibited by protein, and a higher protein content leads to increased hardness of the surface of rice grains. Protein and amylose content is determined by the conditions of rice growth. Higher concentrations of fertilizer result in higher protein content, and nonoptimal environmental factors such as higher temperature and insufficient water make rice chalkier by decreasing starch levels.

== Preparation ==
Rinsing rice before cooking removes much of the starch, thereby reducing the extent to which individual grains will stick together. This yields a fluffier rice, whereas not rinsing yields a stickier and creamier result. Rice produced in the US is usually fortified with vitamins and minerals, and rinsing will result in a loss of nutrients. In 2007, Haitian jails suffered from a beriberi epidemic as US-supplied enriched rice were washed before cooking, stripping them of the nutritious layer; this is despite FDA's rules requiring fortification nutrients to be somewhat resistant to washing.

Rice may be soaked to decrease cooking time, conserve fuel, minimize exposure to high temperature, and reduce stickiness. For some varieties, soaking improves the texture of the cooked rice by increasing expansion of the grains. Rice may be soaked for 30 minutes up to several hours.

Brown rice may be soaked in warm water for 20 hours to stimulate germination. This process, called germinated brown rice (GBR), activates enzymes and enhances amino acids including gamma-aminobutyric acid to improve the nutritional value of brown rice. This method is a result of research carried out for the United Nations International Year of Rice.

Rice is cooked by boiling or steaming, and absorbs water during cooking. With the absorption method, rice is cooked in a volume of water equal to the volume of dry rice plus any evaporation losses, which is commonly measured with the tip of the finger. With the rapid-boil method, rice may be cooked in a large quantity of water which is drained before serving. Rapid-boil preparation is not desirable with enriched rice, as much of the enrichment additives are lost when the water is discarded. Electric rice cookers, popular in Asia and Latin America, simplify the process of cooking rice. Rice (or any other grain) is sometimes quickly fried in oil or fat before boiling (for example saffron rice or risotto); this makes the cooked rice less sticky, and is a cooking style commonly called pilaf in Iran and Afghanistan or biryani in India and Pakistan.

== Dishes ==
In Arab cuisine, rice is an ingredient of many soups and dishes with fish, poultry, and other types of meat. It is used to stuff vegetables or is wrapped in grape leaves (dolma). When combined with milk, sugar, and honey, it is used to make desserts. In some regions, such as Tabaristan, bread is made using rice flour. Rice may be made into congee (also called rice porridge or rice gruel) by adding more water than usual, so that the cooked rice is saturated with water, usually to the point that it disintegrates. Rice porridge is commonly eaten as a breakfast food, and is a traditional food for the sick.

== Nutrition ==
Rice, white, long-grain, regular, unenriched, cooked without salt
Nutritional value per 100 g (3.5 oz)
- Energy: 130 kcal (540 kJ)
- Carbohydrates: 28.1 g
- Sugars: 0.05 g
- Dietary fiber: 0.4 g
- Fat: 0.28 g
- Protein: 2.69 g
Vitamins and minerals
Vitamins	Quantity %DV^{†}
Thiamine (B1)	2% 0.02 mg
Riboflavin (B2)	1% 0.013 mg
Niacin (B3)	3% 0.4 mg
Pantothenic acid (B5)	0% 0 mg
Vitamin B6	5% 0.093 mg
Folate (B9)	0% 0 μg
Minerals	Quantity %DV^{†}
Calcium	1% 10 mg
Iron	1% 0.2 mg
Magnesium	3% 12 mg
Manganese	21% 0.472 mg
Phosphorus	3% 43 mg
Potassium	1% 35 mg
Sodium	0% 1 mg
Zinc	0% 0.049 mg
- Other constituents: Quantity
- Water: 68.44 g
- Link to USDA FoodData Central entry
- ^{†}Percentages estimated using US recommendations for adults, except for potassium, which is estimated based on expert recommendation from the National Academies.

Rice is the staple food of over half the world's population. It is the predominant dietary energy source for 17 countries in Asia and the Pacific, 9 countries in North and South America and 8 countries in Africa. Rice provides 20% of the world's dietary energy supply, while wheat supplies 19% and maize (corn) 5%.

Cooked unenriched long-grain white rice is composed of 68% water, 28% carbohydrates, 3% protein, and 1% fat (table). A 100-gram (3 1/2-ounce) reference serving of it provides 540 kilojoules (130 kilocalories) of food energy and contains moderate amounts of manganese per 100-gram serving (table). Cooked unenriched short-grain rice has a very similar nutritional profile (see footnote link).

A detailed analysis of nutrient content of rice suggests that the nutrition value of rice varies based on a number of factors. It depends on the type and strain of rice, such as white, brown, red, and black (or purple) varieties, each having different prevalence across world regions. It also depends on nutrient quality of the soil rice is grown in, whether and how the rice is polished or processed, the manner it is enriched, and how it is prepared before consumption.

A 2018 World Health Organization (WHO) guideline showed that fortification of rice to reduce malnutrition may involve different micronutrient strategies, including iron only, iron with zinc, vitamin A, and folic acid, or iron with other B-complex vitamins, such as thiamin, niacin, vitamin B6, and pantothenic acid. A systematic review of clinical research on the efficacy of rice fortification showed the strategy had the main effect of reducing the risk of iron deficiency by 35% and increasing blood levels of hemoglobin. The guideline established a major recommendation: "Fortification of rice with iron is recommended as a public health strategy to improve the iron status of populations, in settings where rice is a staple food."

Rice grown experimentally under elevated carbon dioxide levels, similar to those predicted for the year 2100 as a result of human activity, had less iron, zinc, and protein, as well as lower levels of thiamin, riboflavin, folic acid, and pantothenic acid. The following table shows the nutrient content of rice and other major staple foods in a raw form on a dry weight basis to account for their different water contents.

Nutrient content of 10 major staple foods per 100 g dry weight
Staple	Maize (corn)^{[A]}	Rice, white^{[B]}	Wheat^{[C]}	Potatoes^{[D]}	Cassava^{[E]}	Soybeans, green^{[F]}	Sweet potatoes^{[G]}	Yams^{[Y]}	Sorghum^{[H]}	Plantain^{[Z]}	RDA
Water content (%)	10	12	13	79	60	68	77	70	9	65	
Raw grams per 100 g dry weight	111	114	115	476	250	313	435	333	110	286	
Nutrient											
Energy (kJ)	1698	1736	1574	1533	1675	1922	1565	1647	1559	1460	8,368–10,460
Protein (g)	10.4	8.1	14.5	9.5	3.5	40.6	7.0	5.0	12.4	3.7	50
Fat (g)	5.3	0.8	1.8	0.4	0.7	21.6	0.2	0.6	3.6	1.1	44–77
Carbohydrates (g)	82	91	82	81	95	34	87	93	82	91	130
Fiber (g)	8.1	1.5	14.0	10.5	4.5	13.1	13.0	13.7	6.9	6.6	30
Sugar (g)	0.7	0.1	0.5	3.7	4.3	0.0	18.2	1.7	0.0	42.9	minimal
Minerals	^{[A]}	^{[B]}	^{[C]}	^{[D]}	^{[E]}	^{[F]}	^{[G]}	^{[Y]}	^{[H]}	^{[Z]}	RDA
Calcium (mg)	8	32	33	57	40	616	130	57	31	9	1,000
Iron (mg)	3.01	0.91	3.67	3.71	0.68	11.09	2.65	1.80	4.84	1.71	8
Magnesium (mg)	141	28	145	110	53	203	109	70	0	106	400
Phosphorus (mg)	233	131	331	271	68	606	204	183	315	97	700
Potassium (mg)	319	131	417	2005	678	1938	1465	2720	385	1426	4700
Sodium (mg)	39	6	2	29	35	47	239	30	7	11	1,500
Zinc (mg)	2.46	1.24	3.05	1.38	0.85	3.09	1.30	0.80	0.00	0.40	11
Copper (mg)	0.34	0.25	0.49	0.52	0.25	0.41	0.65	0.60	-	0.23	0.9
Manganese (mg)	0.54	1.24	4.59	0.71	0.95	1.72	1.13	1.33	-	-	2.3
Selenium (μg)	17.2	17.2	81.3	1.4	1.8	4.7	2.6	2.3	0.0	4.3	55
Vitamins	^{[A]}	^{[B]}	^{[C]}	^{[D]}	^{[E]}	^{[F]}	^{[G]}	^{[Y]}	^{[H]}	^{[Z]}	RDA
Vitamin C (mg)	0.0	0.0	0.0	93.8	51.5	90.6	10.4	57.0	0.0	52.6	90
Thiamin (B1) (mg)	0.43	0.08	0.34	0.38	0.23	1.38	0.35	0.37	0.26	0.14	1.2
Riboflavin (B2) (mg)	0.22	0.06	0.14	0.14	0.13	0.56	0.26	0.10	0.15	0.14	1.3
Niacin (B3) (mg)	4.03	1.82	6.28	5.00	2.13	5.16	2.43	1.83	3.22	1.97	16
Pantothenic acid (B5) (mg)	0.47	1.15	1.09	1.43	0.28	0.47	3.48	1.03	-	0.74	5
Vitamin B6 (mg)	0.69	0.18	0.34	1.43	0.23	0.22	0.91	0.97	-	0.86	1.3
Folate Total (B9) (μg)	21	9	44	76	68	516	48	77	0	63	400
Vitamin A (IU)	238	0	10	10	33	563	4178	460	0	3220	5000
Vitamin E, alpha-tocopherol (mg)	0.54	0.13	1.16	0.05	0.48	0.00	1.13	1.30	0.00	0.40	15
Vitamin K1 (μg)	0.3	0.1	2.2	9.0	4.8	0.0	7.8	8.7	0.0	2.0	120
Beta-carotene (μg)	108	0	6	5	20	0	36996	277	0	1306	10500
Lutein+zeaxanthin (μg)	1506	0	253	38	0	0	0	0	0	86	6000
Fats	^{[A]}	^{[B]}	^{[C]}	^{[D]}	^{[E]}	^{[F]}	^{[G]}	^{[Y]}	^{[H]}	^{[Z]}	RDA
Saturated fatty acids (g)	0.74	0.20	0.30	0.14	0.18	2.47	0.09	0.13	0.51	0.40	minimal
Monounsaturated fatty acids (g)	1.39	0.24	0.23	0.00	0.20	4.00	0.00	0.03	1.09	0.09	22–55
Polyunsaturated fatty acids (g)	2.40	0.20	0.72	0.19	0.13	10.00	0.04	0.27	1.51	0.20	13–19
	^{[A]}	^{[B]}	^{[C]}	^{[D]}	^{[E]}	^{[F]}	^{[G]}	^{[Y]}	^{[H]}	^{[Z]}	RDA

^{A} raw yellow dent corn
^{B} raw unenriched long-grain white rice
^{C} raw hard red winter wheat
^{D} raw potato with flesh and skin
^{E} raw cassava
^{F} raw green soybeans
^{G} raw sweet potato
^{H} raw sorghum
^{Y} raw yam
^{Z} raw plantains
^{/*} unofficial

== Hazards ==
=== Arsenic ===
As arsenic occurs in soil, water, and air, the United States Food and Drug Administration (FDA) monitors the levels of arsenic in foods, particularly in rice products used commonly for infant food. While growing, rice plants tend to absorb arsenic more readily than other food crops, requiring expanded testing by the FDA for possible arsenic-related risks associated with rice consumption in the United States. In April 2016, the FDA proposed a limit of 100 parts per billion (ppb) for inorganic arsenic in infant rice cereal and other foods to minimize exposure of infants to arsenic. For water contamination by arsenic, the United States Environmental Protection Agency has set a lower standard of 10 ppb.

Arsenic is a IARC Group 1 carcinogen. The amount of arsenic in rice varies widely with the greatest concentration in brown rice and rice grown on land formerly used to grow cotton, such as in Arkansas, Louisiana, Missouri, and Texas. White rice grown in Arkansas, Louisiana, Missouri, and Texas, which account collectively for 76 percent of American-produced rice, had higher levels of arsenic than other regions of the world studied, possibly because of past use of arsenic-based pesticides to control cotton weevils. Jasmine rice from Thailand and Basmati rice from Pakistan and India contain the least arsenic among rice varieties in one study.

=== Bacillus cereus ===
Cooked rice can contain Bacillus cereus spores, which produce an emetic toxin when left at 4–60 °C (39–140 °F). When storing cooked rice for use the next day, rapid cooling is advised to reduce the risk of toxin production. One of the enterotoxins produced by Bacillus cereus is heat-resistant; reheating contaminated rice kills the bacteria, but does not destroy the toxin already present.
