= List of Iranian foods =

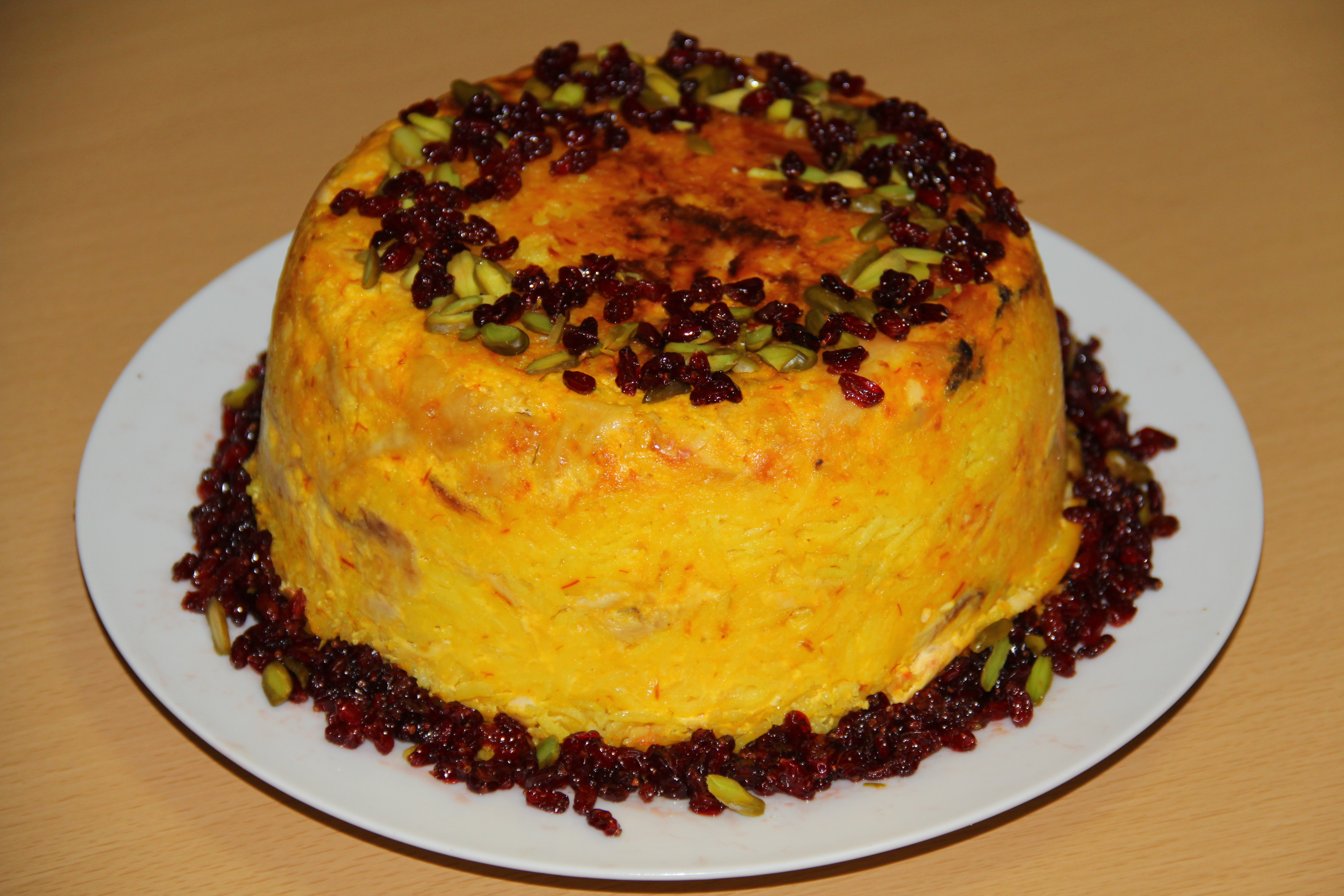
Tahchin, an Iranian rice cake primarily consisting of rice, yogurt, saffron, and eggs.

This is a list of Iranian foods and dishes. Iranian cuisine (Persian cuisine) comprises the cooking traditions of Iran. Iran's culinary culture has historically influenced the cuisines of the neighboring regions, including Caucasian cuisine, Turkish cuisine, Levantine cuisine, Greek cuisine, Central Asian cuisine, and Russian cuisine. Through the various Persianized Muslim sultanates and the Central Asian Mughal dynasty, aspects of Iranian cuisine were also adopted into Indian and Pakistani cuisines.

Typical Iranian main dishes are combinations of rice with meat, vegetables, and nuts. Herbs are frequently used, along with fruits such as plums, pomegranates, quince, prunes, apricots, and raisins. Characteristic Iranian flavorings such as saffron, dried lime and other sources of sour flavoring, cinnamon, turmeric, and parsley are mixed and used in various dishes.

Outside Iran, Iranian cuisine is especially found in cities of the Iranian diaspora such as London, the San Francisco Bay Area, Toronto, Houston and especially Los Angeles and its environs.

== Iranian foods ==
=== Bread ===
Lavash: Thin, flaky, and round or oval. It is the most common bread in Iran and the Caucasus.	Sangak: Plain, rectangular, or triangle-shaped leavened flatbread that is stone-baked.	Taftun: Thin, soft and round-shaped leavened flatbread that is thicker than lavash.
Tanur bread: Leavened bread baked in an oven called tanur.	Qandi bread: A sweet bread, sometimes brioche-like.	Barbari: Thick and oval flatbread.
Sheermal ("milk-rubbed"): A sweet pastry-bread, also widely known as nan-e gisou	Komaj: A sweet date bread with turmeric and cumin, similar to nan e gisu.	

=== Cheese ===
Name	Image	Region	Description
Lighvan cheese		Liqvan	a brined curd cheese traditionally made in Iran. Having a sour flavor, and a shape covered by holes, the cheese is produced from sheep's milk. The name comes from Liqvan, a village in Tabriz, where it has traditionally been made.
Talesh cheese		Talesh	it can only be found in Talesh County. this cheese is made from goat or sheep milk. Once the cheese is processed, it is held in sheep or goat skin for aging and preservation.
Mahali cheese		Mazandaran	This cheese is very similar to Indian Paneer. It is made from full fat cow's milk. It tastes mild and is kept in salt brine.
Pot Cheese (kuzeh) کوزه	Kupe paniri	Urumia	Kuzeh Paniri or Kupe paniri or Pot Cheese is a form of salty cheese made of Cow's milk and stored in a pot or jug under the ground for fermentation. It is common in Northwest of Iran specially in cities of Khoy and Urumia. It is made by adding white vinegar to cooled down boiled milk and then gathering the curd and stuffing it in a pot or jug and then the pot is buried under the ground where water is sometimes added to the soil. Sesame seeds or fennel flower seeds and poppy seeds and black caraway is then added to taste better and also lots of salt, after at least 2 months being in the pot it is taken out and then sun dried.

=== Rice ===
Method	Description
Polow and chelow	Chelow is plain rice served as an accompaniment to a stew or kebab, while polow is rice mixed with something. They are, however, cooked in the same way. Rice is prepared by soaking in salted water and then boiling it. The parboiled rice (called chelow) is drained and returned to the pot to be steamed. This method results in an exceptionally fluffy rice with the rice grains separated and not sticky. A browned crust of rice, called tadig, forms at the bottom of the pot; sometimes, instead of plain rice, a thin layer of bread or potato slices is used for creating the tahdig. Often, tadig is served plain with only a rice crust. Meat, vegetables, nuts, and fruit are sometimes added in layers or mixed with the chelow and then steamed. When chelow is in the pot, the heat is reduced and a thick cloth or towel is placed under the pot lid to absorb excess steam.
Kateh	Rice that is cooked until the water is absorbed completely. It is the traditional dish of Gilan Province.
Dami	Rice that is cooked almost the same as kateh, but at the start, ingredients that can be cooked thoroughly with the rice (such as grains and beans) are added. While making kateh, the heat is reduced to a minimum until the rice and other ingredients are almost cooked. If kept long enough on the stove without burning and over-cooking, dami and kateh can also produce tadig. A special form of dami is tachin, which is a mixture of yogurt, chicken (or lamb) and rice, plus saffron and egg yolks.

=== Polo and dami ===
Sabzi polow: Rice with chopped herbs, usually served with fish.	Lubia polow: Rice with green beans and minced meat.	Albalu polow: Rice with sour cherries and slices of chicken or red meat.	Morasa polow: Rice "jewelled" with barberries, pistachios, raisins, carrots, orange peel, and almonds.
Shirin polow: Rice with sweet carrots, raisins, and almonds.	Adas polow: Rice with lentils, raisins, and dates.	Baqali polow: Rice with fava beans and dill weed.	Dampokhtak: Turmeric rice with lima beans.
Tachin: Rice cake including yogurt, egg, and chicken fillets.		Kalam Polow: Rice with cabbage and different herbs.	Zereshk Polow: Rice with berberis and saffron.

=== Kebab ===
Kabab koobideh: Barbecued ground lamb or beef, mixed with parsley and onion.	Juje kabab: Grilled chunks of chicken; one of the most common dishes in Iran.	Kabab barg: Barbecued and marinated lamb, chicken or beef.
Kabab torsh: Traditional kebab from Gilan and Mazenderan, marinated in a paste of crushed walnuts, pomegranate juice, and olive oil.	Kabab Bakhtyari: Mixture of barbecued fillet of lamb (or veal) and chicken breast.	Chenje: Skewered and grilled cubes of meat. Iranian equivalent of shish kebab.
Shashlik: A popular form of shish kebab. In Iranian cuisine, shashlik is usually in form of large chunks.	Kabab tabei: Homemade grilled meat, prepared on the pan.	Bonab kabab: A type of kebab that is made of ground lamb, onion, and salt in the city of Bonab.

=== Stew ===
Khoresh e bademjan: Eggplant stew with tomato, Verjuice and saffron.	Khoresh e fesenjan: Stew flavored with pomegranate syrup or ground walnuts.	Khoresh e qeyme: Stew with split peas, French fries, and dried lime.	Qorme sabzi: Stew with herbs such as leek, cilantro, and dried fenugreek.
Khoresh e karafs: Stewed celery and meat.	Khoresh e alu: Stewed prunes and meat.	Khoresh e alu-esfenaj: Stewed prunes, spinach, and meat.	Khoresh e havij: Stewed carrots and meat.
Khoresh e qarch: Mushroom stew.	Baqala qatoq: Gilak stew with fava bean, dill, and eggs.	Dizi (piti): Mutton stew with chickpeas and potatoes.	Kufte rize: Azerbaijani and Kurdish meatball stew.

=== Soup and āsh ===
Sup e morgh: Chicken and noodle soup.	Sup e jow: Barley soup.	Sirabi: Tripe soup; also known as sirab shirdun.
Tarkhine: Grain and yoghurt soup.	Gazane: Nettle soup.	Adasi: Lentil soup.
Āsh e reshte: Noodle thick soup.	Āsh e anār: Pomegranate thick soup.	Āsh e doogh: Buttermilk thick soup.
Kalle Joosh: Kashk thick soup.	Bozbash: meat soup with red or white beans, green vegetables, herbs, onions and leeks, dried limes and spices.	Shole: Thick soup with meat, different Legume, wheat Bulgur, rice, Nutmeg and other Spices. Shole is originally from Mashhad.

=== Other ===
Kuku: Whipped eggs folded in with herbs or potato.	Kotlet: Mixture of fried ground beef, mashed potato, and onion.	Salad Olivie: Mixture of potato, eggs, peas, and diced chicken (or sausage), dressed with mayonnaise.	Caviar: Salt-cured fish eggs.
Dolme: Stuffed peppers or vine leaves.	Kufte: Meatball or meatloaf dishes.	Zaban: Beef tongue.	Pache: Boiled parts of cow or sheep; also known as khash.
Pirashki (pirozhki): Baked or fried buns stuffed with a variety of fillings.	Sosis bandari: Traditional sausage with onion, tomato paste, and chili pepper.	Nargesi: A type of spinach omelette.	Sirabij: A type of garlic omelette.
Gondi: Iranian Jewish dish of meatball.	Iranian pizza: A typical Iranian pizza.	Dopiaza: Traditional Shiraz curry prepared with a large quantity of onions.	Joshpara: Azerbaijani meat-filled dumplings.
Shenitsel: Fried breaded meat.	Tomato scrambled eggs: A dish made from eggs and tomato.	Jaqur-Baqur: A dish made from sheep's heart, liver and kidney.	Biryan: A traditional dish in Isfahan made from minced meat, fat, onion, cinnamon, saffron, walnut and mint that served with baked lung.

=== Appetizers ===
Torshi: Mixed pickles salad.	Salad Shirazi: Chopped cucumbers, tomato, and onion with verjuice and a little lemon juice.	Borani: Yogurt with spinach and other ingredients.	Mast o khiar: Strained yogurt with cucumber, garlic, and mint.
Sabzi (greens): Fresh herbs and raw vegetables.	Zeytoon parvardeh: Olives in a paste made of pomegranate, walnut and garlic.	Mirza qasemi: Grilled eggplant with egg, garlic and tomato.	Kashk e bademjan: Mixture of kashk, eggplant and mint.

=== Desserts ===
Fereni: Sweet rice pudding flavored with rose water.	Sholezard: Saffron rice-based dessert.	Halva: Wheat flour and butter, flavored with rose water.	Bastani e zaferani: Saffron ice cream.
Falude: Vermicelli mixed in a semi-frozen syrup of sugar and rose water.	Sarshir: Creamy dairy product similar to clotted cream.	Liqvan and feta: Brined curd cheese, typically eaten for breakfast.	Samanu: Germinated wheat, typically served for Nowruz.

=== Snacks ===
Koluche: Cookies, with major production in Fuman and Lahijan.	Bamie: Deep fried dough soaked in sugar syrup.	Baqlava: Pastry made of filo, nuts, and sugar syrup.	Reshte khoshkar: Fried and spiced rice flour and walnut.
Nougat and gaz: Made of sugar, nuts, and egg white.	Sohan: Saffron brittle candy with nuts.	Sohan asali: Brittle candy with honey.	Nan-e berenji: Rice flour cookies.
Tabrizi Lovuez: Diamond-shaped, made of almond powder, sugar, and saffron.	Nokhodchi: Chickpea cookies.	Qottab: Almond-filled deep-fried pastry.	Kolompe: Pie made of dates and cardamom.
Nabat chubi: Rock candy, commonly flavored with saffron in Iran.	Pashmak: Cotton candy.	Trail mix: Dried fruit, grains, and nuts.	Quince cheese: Made of quince and sugar.
Ajil e Moshkel-gosha: Traditional packed trail mix for Nowruz.	Gush e fil: Dough topped with pistachios powdered sugar.	Poolaki: Thin candy made of sugar, water, and white vinegar.	Baslogh: Pastry made of grape syrup, starch and almond.

=== Drinks ===
Doogh: Cold yogurt drink.	Pomegranate juice	Carrot juice, sometimes mixed with ice cream.	Khakshir: Cold sweet drink with Descurainia sophia seeds.
Sekanjebin: Cold drink made of honey and vinegar.	Aragh sagi: A type of distilled alcoholic beverage.	Sharbat: Cold and sweet drink made of fruits or flower petals.	Shiraz wine: Wine produced from Shiraz grapes around the city of Shiraz in Iran.

== See also ==
- Lists of foods
- Iranian cuisine
