= Iranian cuisine =

Culinary traditions of Iran

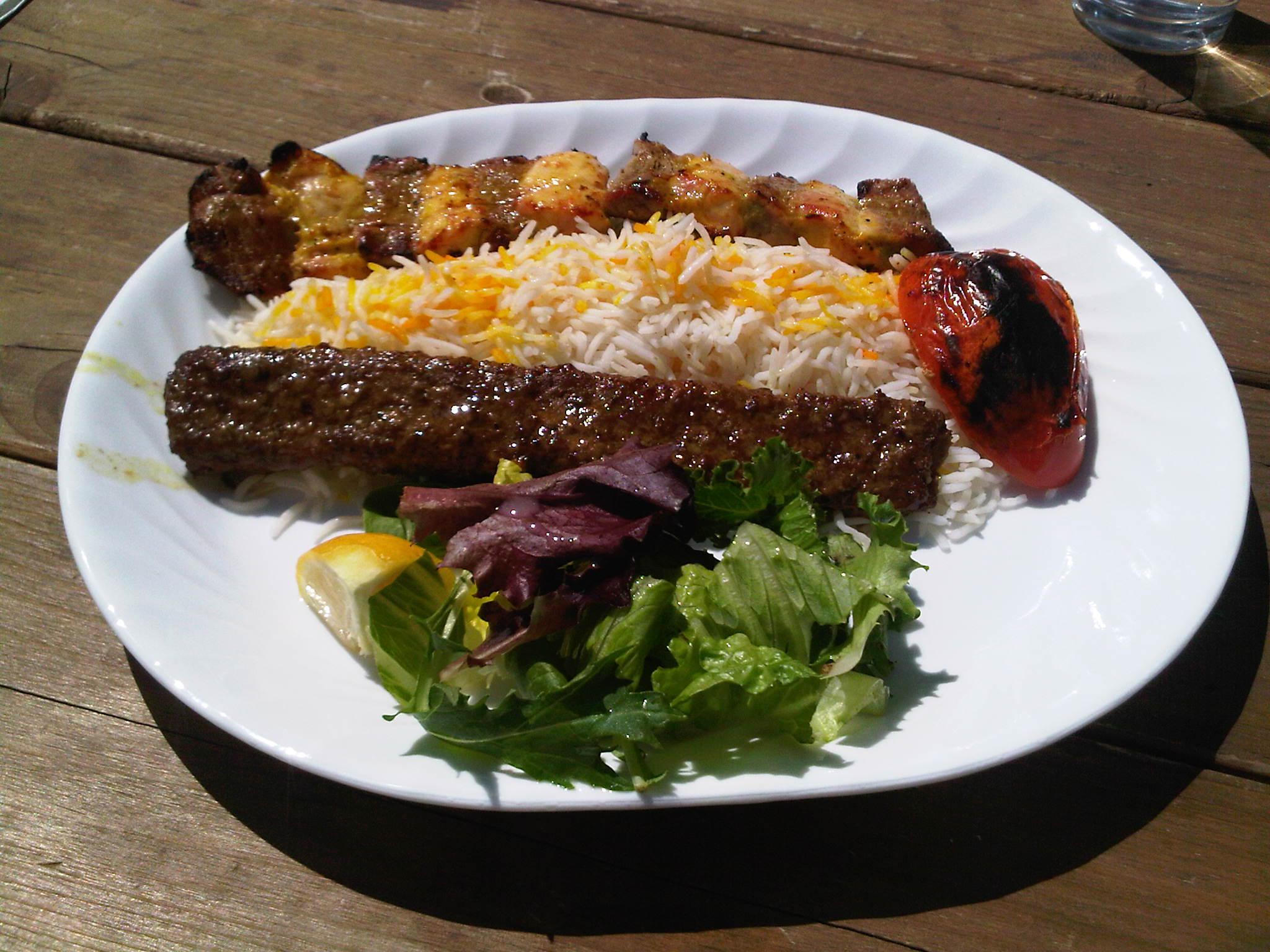
Chelow kabab is considered to be the national dish of Iran.

Iranian cuisine comprises the culinary traditions of Iran. Due to the historically common usage of the term "Persia" to refer to Iran in the Western world, it is alternatively known as Persian cuisine, despite Persians being only one of a multitude of Iranian ethnic groups who have contributed to Iran's culinary traditions. (Note: This issue is still debated today.)

Iran has a rich variety of traditional dishes, and has influenced many other cuisines over the ages, among them Caucasian cuisine, Central Asian cuisine, Greek cuisine, Levantine cuisine, Mesopotamian cuisine, Russian cuisine and Turkish cuisine. Aspects of Iranian cuisine have also been significantly adopted by Indian cuisine and Pakistani cuisine through various historical Persianate sultanates that flourished during Muslim rule on the Indian subcontinent, most significantly the Mughal Empire.

Typical Iranian main dishes are combinations of rice with meat, vegetables and nuts. Herbs are frequently used, such as parsley, fenugreek, chives, mint, savory and coriander, in their fresh and dried forms. Another consistent feature of Persian cuisine is the abundant use of fruits, in combination with various meats as well as in rice dishes; the most commonly used fruits include plums, pomegranates, quince, prunes, apricots, barberries, and raisins. Characteristic Iranian spices and flavourings such as saffron, cardamom, and dried lime and other sources of sour flavoring, cinnamon, turmeric and parsley are mixed and used in various dishes.

Outside of Iran, Iranian cuisine can be found in cities with significant Iranian diaspora populations, namely London, the San Francisco Bay Area, the Washington metropolitan area, Vancouver, Toronto, Houston and especially Los Angeles and its environs.

== History ==
Among the writings available from the Middle Persian scripts, the treatise of Khosrow and Ridag, contains descriptions of food in the Sassanid period. The names of many Iranian dishes and culinary terms can be found in Arabic books.

Ancient Persian philosophers and physicians have influenced the preparation of Iranian foods to follow the rules of the strengthening and weakening characteristics of foods based on the Iranian traditional medicine.

== Historical Iranian cookbooks ==
Although the Arabic cookbooks (e.g. Kitab al-Tabikh) written under the rule of the Abbasid Caliphate—one of the Arab caliphates which ruled Iran after the Muslim invasion—include some recipes with Iranian names, the earliest surviving classical cookbooks in Persian are two volumes from the Safavid period. The older one is entitled "Manual on cooking and its craft" (Kār-nāmeh dar bāb e tabbāxī va sanat e ān) written in 927/1521 for an aristocratic patron at the end of the reign of Ismail I. The book originally contained 26 chapters, listed by the author in his introduction, but chapters 23 through 26 are missing from the surviving manuscript. The recipes include measurements for ingredients—often detailed directions for the preparation of dishes, including the types of utensils and pots to be used—and instructions for decorating and serving them. In general, the ingredients and their combinations in various recipes do not differ significantly from those in use today. The large quantities specified, as well as the generous use of such luxury ingredients as saffron, suggest that these dishes were prepared for large aristocratic households, even though in his introduction, the author claimed to have written it "for the benefit of the nobility, as well as the public."

The second surviving Safavid cookbook, entitled "The substance of life, a treatise on the art of cooking" (Māddat al-ḥayāt, resāla dar ʿelm e ṭabbāxī), was written about 76 years later by a chef for Abbas I. The introduction of that book includes elaborate praise of God, the prophets, the imams, and the shah, as well as a definition of a master chef. It is followed by six chapters on the preparation of various dishes: four on rice dishes, one on qalya, and one on āsh. The measurements and directions are not as detailed as in the earlier book. The information provided is about dishes prepared at the royal court, including references to a few that had been created or improved by the shahs themselves. Other contemporary cooks and their specialties are also mentioned.

== Staple foods ==
=== Rice ===
The usage of rice, at first a specialty of the Safavid Empire's court cuisine, evolved by the end of the 16th century CE into a major branch of Iranian cookery. Traditionally, rice was most prevalent as a major staple item in northern Iran and the homes of the wealthy, while bread was the dominant staple in the rest of the country.

Varieties of rice in Iran include gerde, domsia (literally meaning black-tail, because it is black at one end), champa, doodi (smoked rice), Lenjan (from Lenjan County), Tarom (from Tarom County), and anbarbu.

The following table includes three primary methods of cooking rice in Iran.

Method	Description
Polow and chelow	Chelow is plain rice served as an accompaniment to a stew or kebab, while polow is rice mixed with something. They are, however, cooked in the same way. Rice is prepared by soaking in salted water and then boiling it. The parboiled rice (called chelow) is drained and returned to the pot to be steamed. This method results in exceptionally fluffy rice, with the rice grains separated and not sticky. A golden crust called tahdig or tadig is created at the bottom of the pot using a thin layer of bread or potato slices. Often, tahdig is served plain with only a rice crust. Meat, vegetables, nuts, and fruit are sometimes added in layers or mixed with the chelow and then steamed. When chelow is in the pot, the heat is reduced, and a thick cloth or towel is placed under the pot lid to absorb excess steam.
Kateh	Rice that is cooked until the water is absorbed completely. It is the traditional dish of Gilan Province.
Dami	Rice that is cooked almost the same as kateh, but at the start, ingredients that can be cooked thoroughly with the rice (such as grains and beans) are added. While making kateh, the heat is reduced to a minimum until the rice and other ingredients are almost cooked. If kept long enough on the stove without burning and over-cooking, dami and kateh can also produce tahdig. A special form of dami is tachin, which is a mixture of yogurt, chicken (or lamb), and rice, plus saffron and egg yolks.

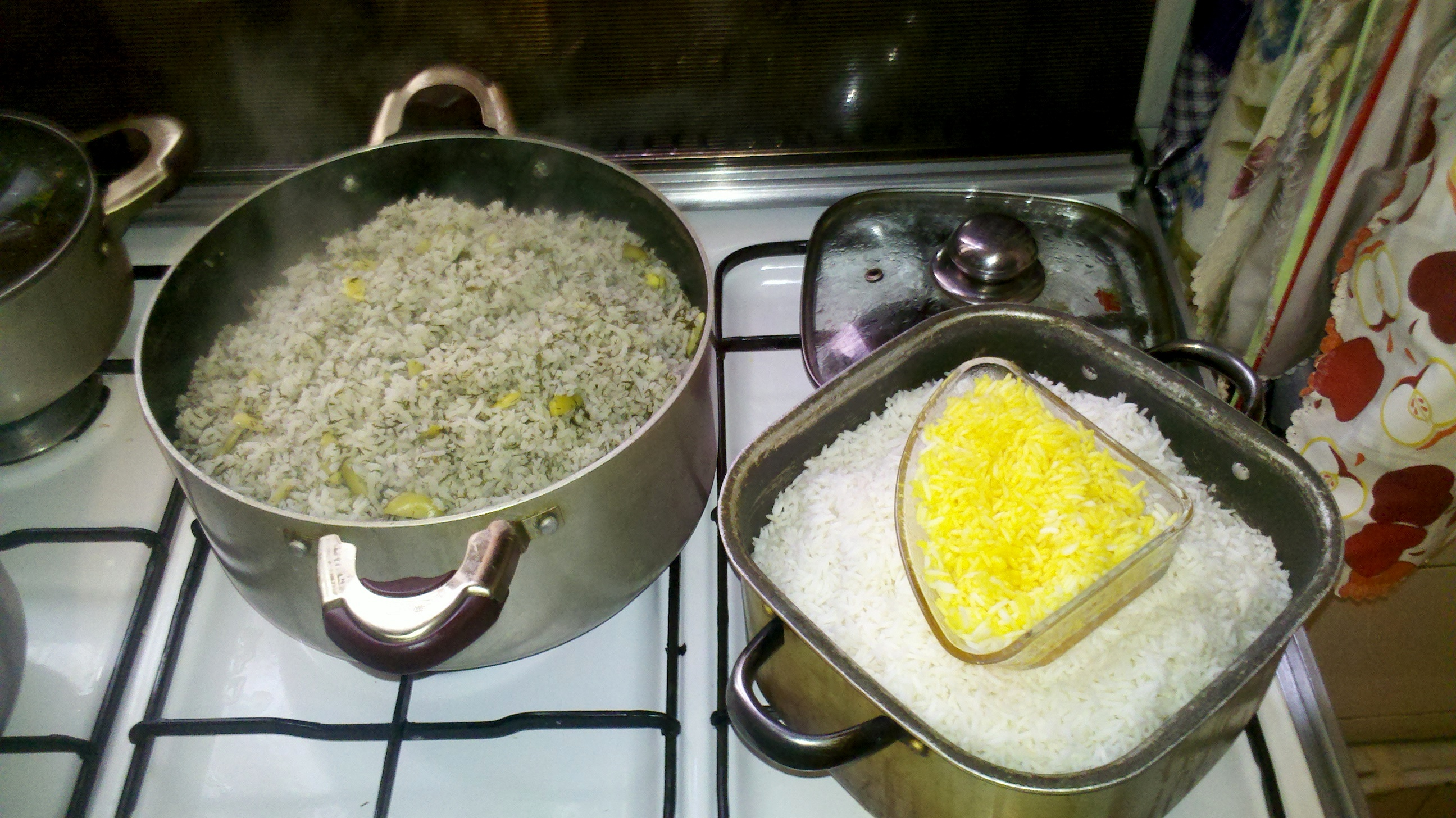
Iranian-style rice-cooking

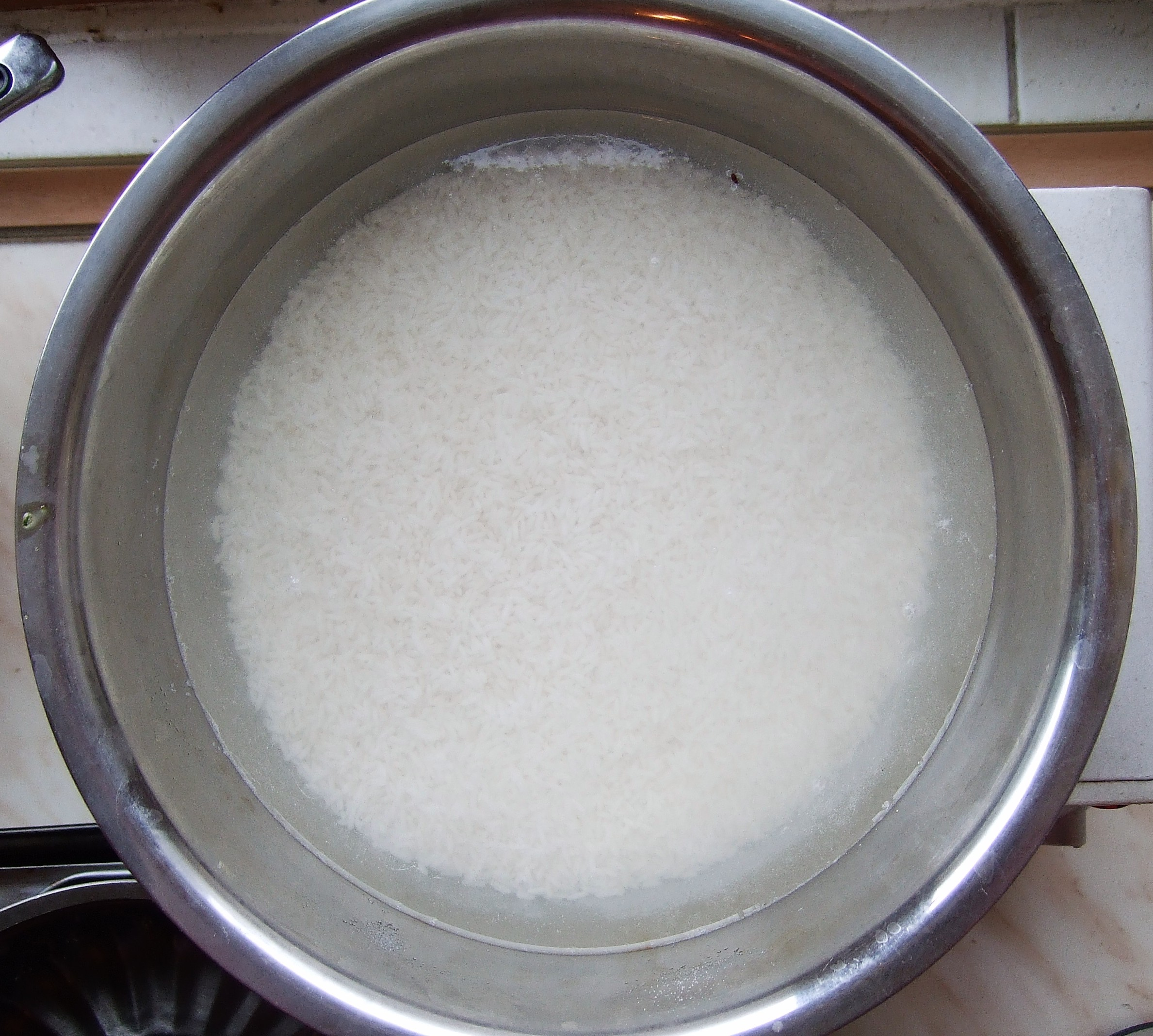
Soaking rice in a pot

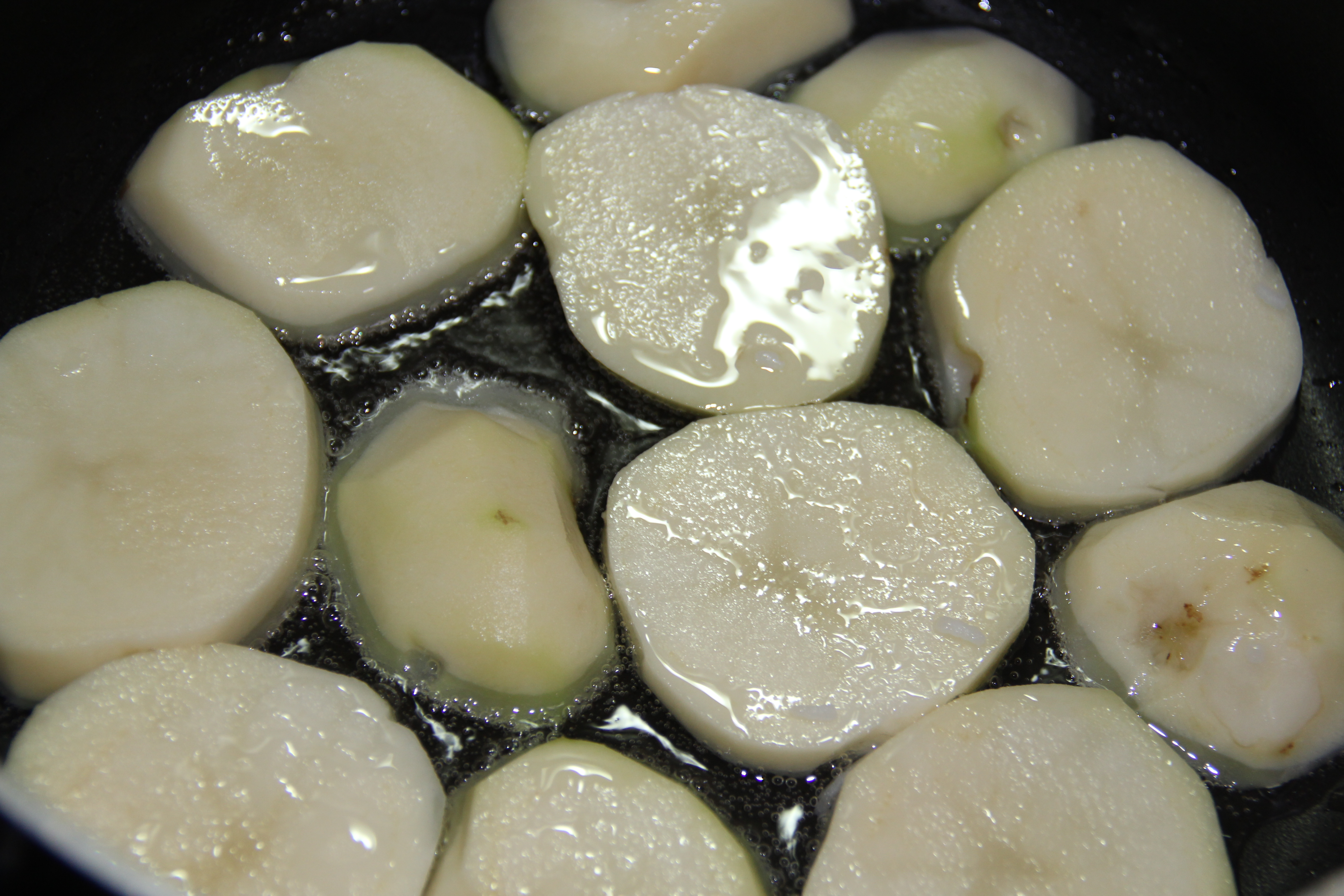
Using potatoes as tahdig in chelow-style rice-cooking

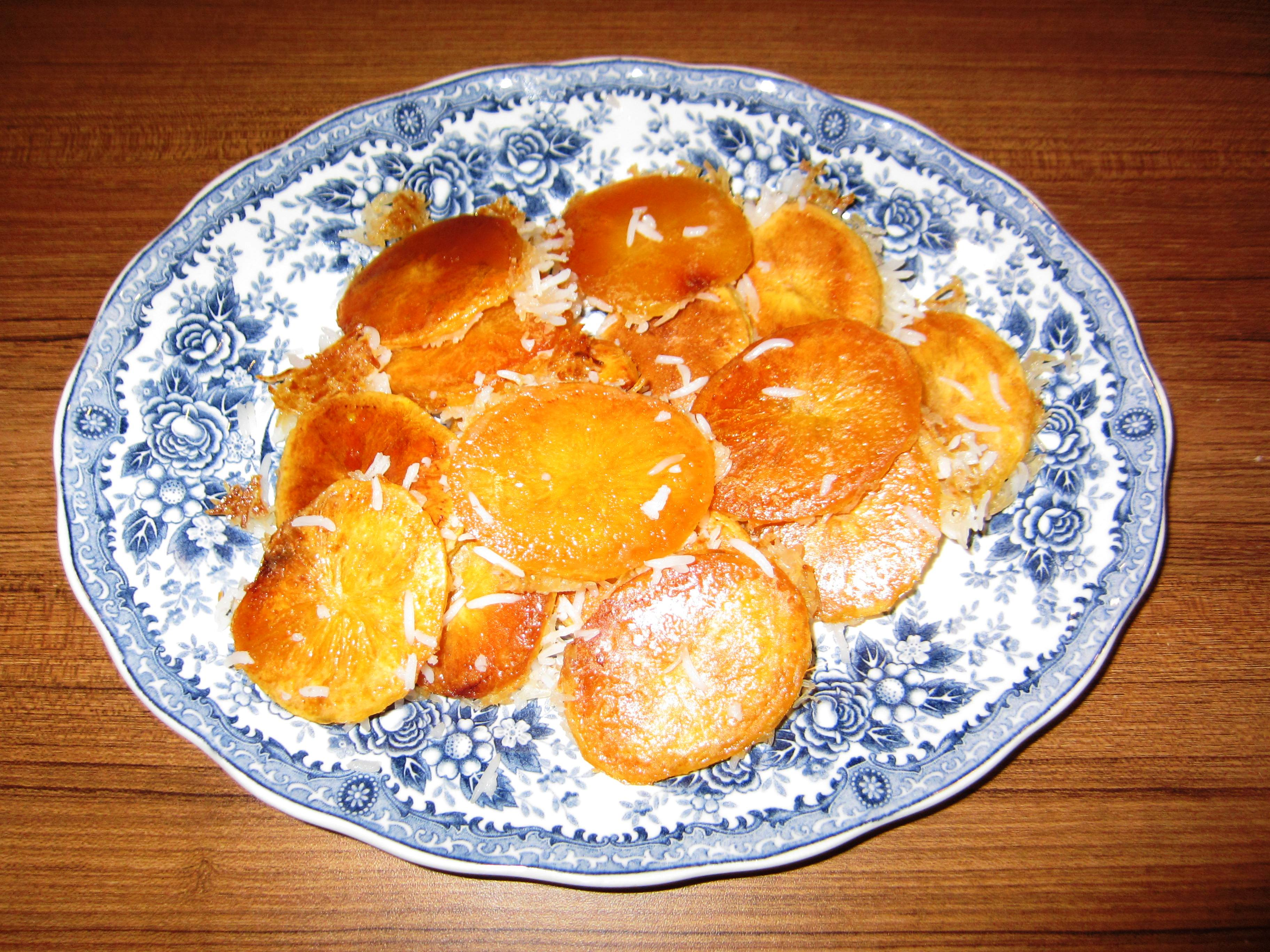
Potato tahdig

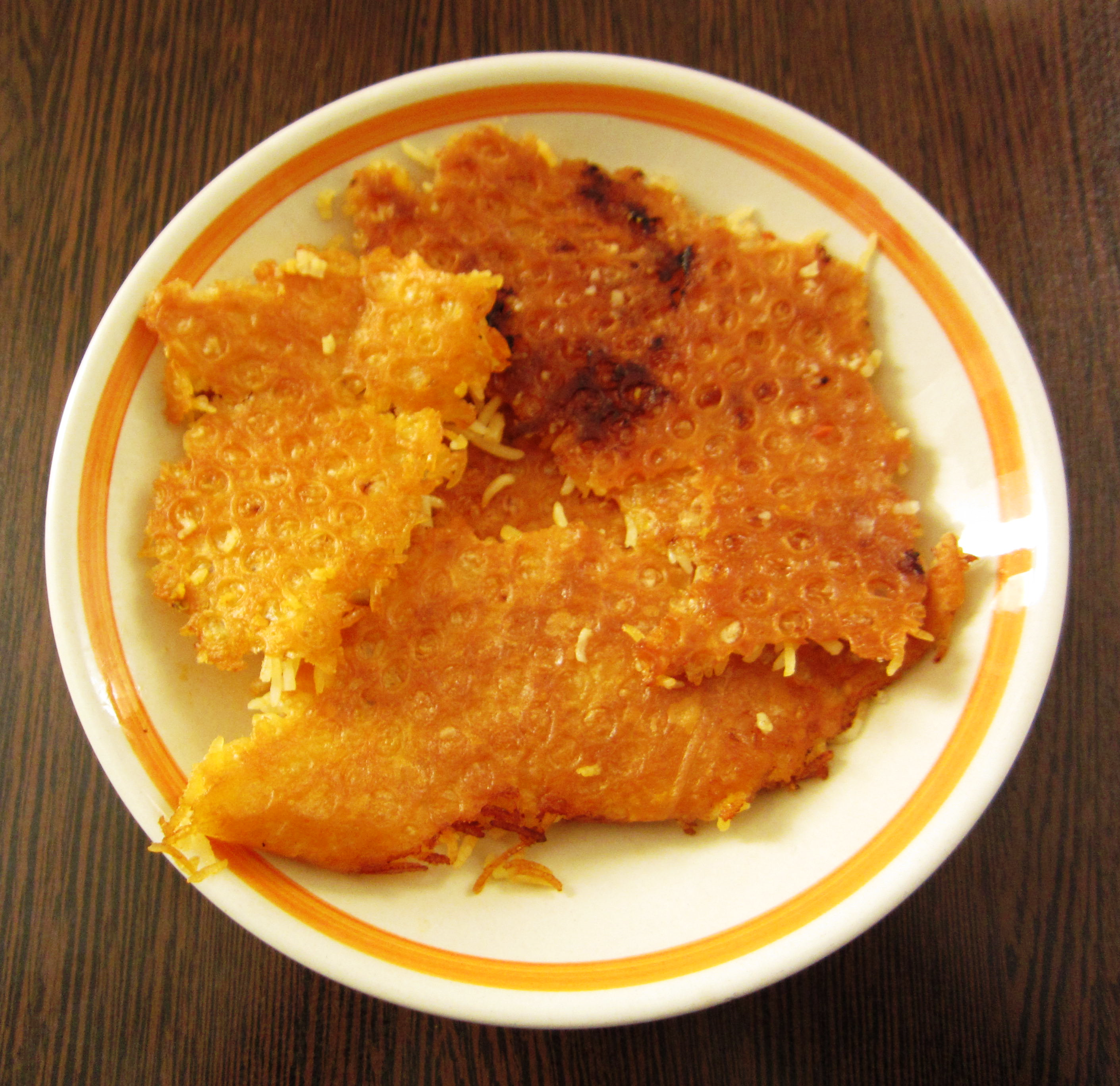
Tahdig of lavash bread

=== Bread ===
Second only to rice is the production and use of wheat. The following table lists several forms of flatbread and pastry bread commonly used in Iranian cuisine.

Lavash: Thin, flaky, and round or oval. It is the most common bread in Iran and the Caucasus.	Sangak: Plain, rectangular, or triangle-shaped leavened flatbread that is stone-baked.	Taftun: Thin, soft and round-shaped leavened flatbread that is thicker than lavash.	Qandi bread: A sweet bread, sometimes brioche-like and sometimes flat and dry.	Barbari: Thick and oval flatbread; also known as Tabrizi, referring to the city of Tabriz.
Baguette: A long, narrow French loaf, typically filled with sausages and vegetables.	Sheermal ("milk-rubbed"): A sweet pastry bread, also widely known as nan-e gisou	Komaj: A sweet date bread with turmeric and cumin, similar to nan e gisu.		

=== Fruits and vegetables ===
The agriculture of Iran produces many fruits and vegetables. Thus, a bowl of fresh fruit is common on Iranian tables, and vegetables are standard side dishes in most meals. These are not only enjoyed fresh and ripe as desserts but are also combined with meat as accompaniments to main dishes. When fresh fruits are not available, a large variety of dried fruits such as dates, figs, apricots, plums and peaches are served instead. Southern Iran is one of the world's major date producers, where some special cultivars such as the Bam date are grown.

Vegetables such as pumpkins, spinach, green beans, fava beans, courgette, varieties of squash, onion, garlic and carrot are commonly used in Iranian dishes. Tomatoes, cucumbers and scallion often accompany a meal. While the eggplant is "the potato of Iran", Iranians are fond of fresh green salads dressed with olive oil, lemon juice, salt, chili powder, and garlic powder.

Fruit dolma is probably a specialty of Iranian cuisine. The fruit is first cooked, then stuffed with meat, seasonings, and sometimes tomato sauce. The dolma is then simmered in meat broth or a scallion sweet-and-sour sauce.

Verjuice, a highly acidic juice made by pressing unripe grapes or other sour fruit, is used in various Iranian dishes. It is mainly used within soup and stew dishes, but also to simmer a type of squash dolma. Unripe grapes are also used whole in some dishes such as khoresh-e ghooreh (lamb stew with sour grapes). As a spice, verjuice powder (pudr-e ghooreh) is sometimes reinforced by verjuice and then dried.

== Typical spices ==
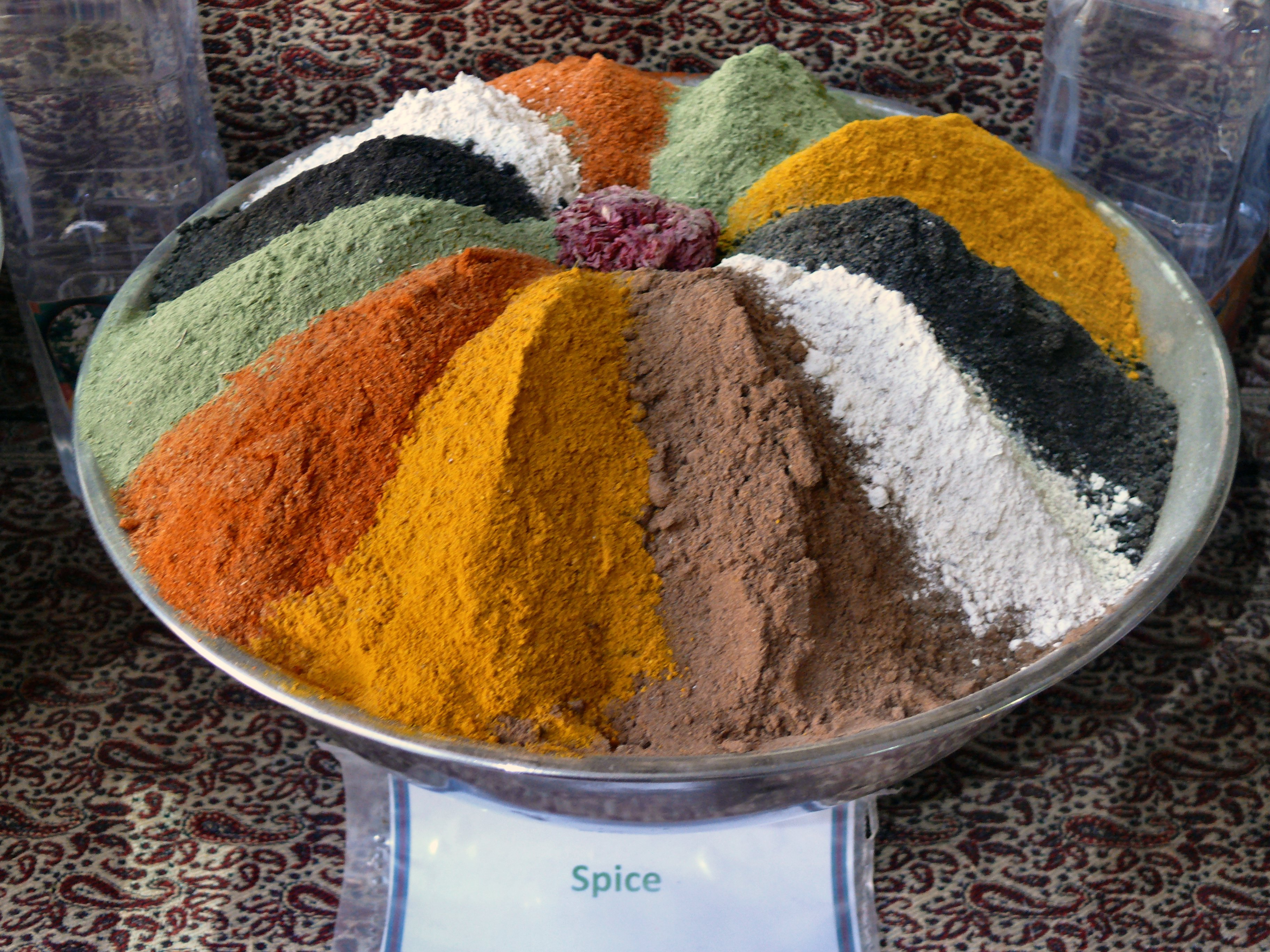
A spice bowl in a shop at the Vakil Bazaar of Shiraz

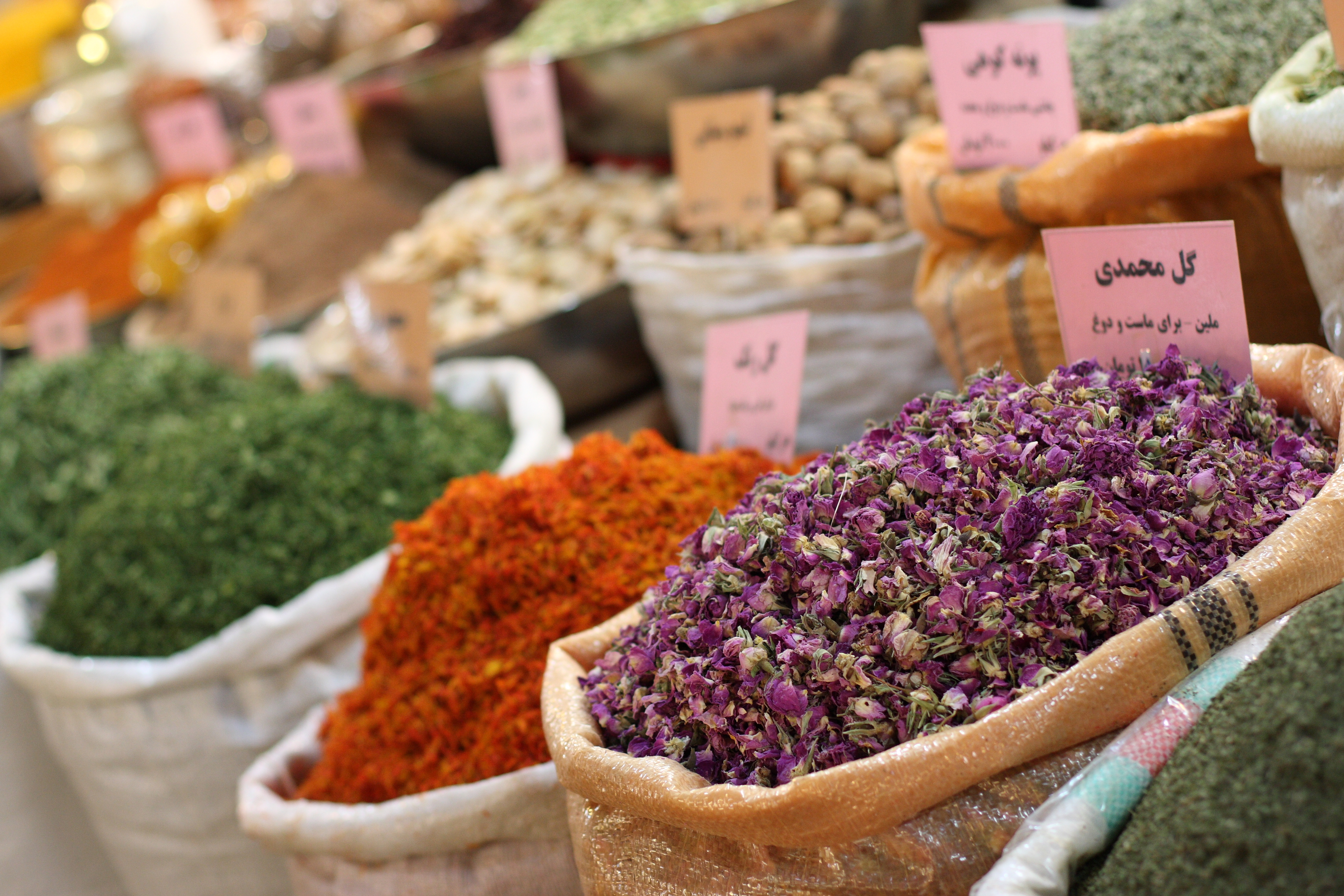
A spice shop at the bazaar of Isfahan

Advieh or chāshni refers to a wide variety of pungent vegetables and dried fruits that are used in Iranian cuisine to flavor food.

One of the traditional and most widespread Iranian spices is saffron, derived from the flower of Crocus sativus. Rose water, a flavored water made by steeping rose petals in water, is also a traditional and common ingredient in many Iranian dishes.

Persian hogweed (golpar), which grows wild in the humid mountainous regions of Iran, is used as a spice in various Iranian soups and stews. It is also mixed with vinegar into which broad beans are dipped before eating.

Some other common spices are cardamom, made from the seeds of several Elettaria and Amomum plants; shevid, an annual herb in the celery family Apiaceae; mahleb, an aromatic spice made from the seeds of Prunus mahaleb; and limu amani, dried lime.

There are also several traditional combinations of spices, two of which are arde (tahini), made from toasted ground hulled sesame seeds, and delal sauce, made of heavily salted fresh herbs such as cilantro and parsley.

== Typical food and drinks ==
Typical Iranian cuisine includes a wide variety of dishes, including several forms of kebab, stew, soup, and pilaf dishes, as well as various salads, desserts, pastries, and drinks.

=== Main course ===
==== Kebab ====
In Iran, kebabs are served either with rice or with bread. A dish of chelow white rice with kebab is called chelow kabab, which is considered the national dish of Iran. The rice can also be prepared using the kateh method, and hence the dish would be called kateh kebab.

The following table lists several forms of kebab used in Iranian cuisine.

Kabab koobideh: Barbecued ground lamb or beef, mixed with parsley and onion.	Jujeh kabab: Grilled chunks of chicken; one of the most common dishes in Iran.	Kabab barg: Barbecued and marinated lamb, chicken or beef.
Kabab torsh: Traditional kebab from Gilan and Mazenderan, marinated in a paste of crushed walnuts, pomegranate juice, and olive oil.	Kabab bakhtyari: Mixture of barbecued fillet of lamb (or veal) and chicken breast.	Chenje: Skewered and grilled cubes of meat. Iranian equivalent of shish kebab.
Shashlik: A popular form of shish kebab. In Iranian cuisine, shashlik is usually in form of large chunks.	Kabab tabei: Homemade grilled meat, prepared on the pan.	Bonab kababi: A type of kebab that is made of ground mutton, onion, and salt in the city of Bonab.

==== Stew ====
Khoresh is an Iranian form of stew, which is usually accompanied by a plate of white rice. A khoresh typically consists of herbs, fruits, and meat pieces, flavored with tomato paste, saffron, and pomegranate juice. Other non-khoresh types of stew such as dizi are accompanied by bread instead of rice.

Several Iranian stew dishes are listed within the following table.

Khoresh bademjan: Eggplant stew with tomato, verjuice and saffron.	Khoresh-e fesenjan: Stew flavored with pomegranate syrup and ground walnuts.	Khoresh-e qeyme: Stew with split peas, French fries, and dried lime.	Qormeh sabzi: Stew with herbs such as parsley, leek, cilantro, and fenugreek.
Khoresh-e karafs: Stewed celery and meat.	Khoresh-e alu: Stewed prunes and meat.	Khoresh-e alu esfenaj: Stewed prunes, spinach, and meat.	Khoresh-e Havij: Stewed carrots and meat.
Khoresh-e Qarch: Mushroom stew.	Baqala Qatoq: Gilak stew with fava beans, dill, and eggs.	Dizi (piti): Mutton stew with chickpeas and potatoes.	Kuft-e Rize: Azerbaijani and Kurdish meatball stew.
Khoresh-e Bamieh: Okra and meat stew.	Khoresh-e Kadu: Stewed zucchini and meat.		

==== Soup and āsh ====
There are various forms of soup in Iranian cuisine, including sup e jow (barley soup), sup e esfenaj (spinach soup), sup e qarch (mushroom soup), and several forms of thick soup. A thick soup is referred to as āsh in Iran, which is an Iranian traditional form of soup. Also, shole qalamkar is the Iranian term for "hodge-podge" soup, a soup made of a mixture of various ingredients.

The following table lists a number of soup and āsh dishes in Iranian cuisine.

Soup-e Morgh: Chicken and noodle soup.	Soup-e Jow: Barley soup.	Sirabi: Tripe soup; also known as sirab shirdun.
Tarkhineh: Grain and yoghurt soup.	Gazaneh: Nettle soup.	Adasi: Lentil soup.
Āsh-e Reshte: Noodle thick soup.	Āsh-e Anār: Pomegranate thick soup.	Āsh-e Doogh: Buttermilk thick soup.
Kalle Joosh: Kashk thick soup.	Bozbash: meat soup with red or white beans, green vegetables, herbs, onions and leeks, dried limes and spices.	Sholeh: Thick soup with meat, different legumes, bulgur, rice, nutmeg and other spices. Shole is originally from Mashhad.

==== Polow and dami ====
Apart from dishes of rice with kebab or stew, there are various rice-based Iranian dishes cooked in the traditional methods of polow and dami.

Polow is the Persian word for pilaf and it is also used in other Iranian languages, in the English language it may have variations in spelling. A polow dish includes rice stuffed with cuts of vegetables, fruits, and beans, usually accompanied by either chicken or red meat. Dami dishes are similar to polow in that they involve various ingredients with rice, however they are cooked using the dami method of cooking the dish all in one pot.

The following are a number of traditional Iranian rice-based dishes:

Sabzi Polo: Rice with chopped herbs, usually served with fish.	Loobia Polo: Rice with green beans and minced meat.	Albalu Polo: Rice with sour cherries and slices of chicken or red meat.	Morasa Polo: Rice "jewelled" with barberries, pistachios, raisins, carrots, orange peel, and almonds.
Shirin Polo: Rice with sweet carrots, raisins, and almonds.	Adas Polo: Rice with lentils, raisins, and dates.	Baqali Polo: Rice with fava beans and dill weed.	Dampokhtak: Turmeric rice with lima beans.
Tachin: Rice cake including yogurt, egg, and chicken fillets.	Kalam Polo: Rice with cabbage and different herbs.	Zereshk Polo: Rice with berberis and saffron.	

==== Other ====
Kuku: Whipped eggs folded in with herbs or potato.	Kotlet: Mixture of fried ground beef, mashed potato, and onion.	Olivier salad: Mixture of potato, eggs, peas, and diced chicken (or sausage), dressed with mayonnaise.	Caviar: Salt-cured fish eggs.
Dolmeh: Stuffed peppers or vine leaves.	Kufte: Meatball or meatloaf dishes.	Zaban: Beef tongue.	Pache: Boiled parts of cow or sheep; also known as khash.
Pirashki (pirozhki): Baked or fried buns stuffed with a variety of fillings.	Sosis Bandari: Traditional sausage with onion, tomato paste, and chili pepper.	Nargesi: A type of spinach omelette.	Sirabij: A type of garlic omelette.
Gondi: Iranian Jewish dish of meatball.	Iranian pizza: A typical Iranian pizza.	Dopiaza: Traditional Shiraz curry prepared with a large quantity of onions.	Joshpara: Azerbaijani meat-filled dumplings.
Tomato scrambled eggs: A dish made from eggs and tomato.	Jaqur-Baqur: A dish made from sheep's heart, liver and kidney.	Beryani: A traditional dish in Isfahan made from minced meat, fat, onion, cinnamon, saffron, walnut and mint that is served with baked lung.	Omelette: Originated in ancient Persia and was introduced worldwide in the 16th century.
Iranian style Falafel: deep-fried patty made from chickpeas, mixed with herbs	Omlet-e Goje Farangi (a.k.a Shakshuka): egg dish, with concentrated tomato base		

=== Appetizers ===
Torshi: Mixed pickles salad.	Salad Shirazi: Chopped cucumbers, tomato, and onion with verjuice and a little lemon juice.	Borani: Yogurt with spinach and other ingredients.	Mast-o Khiar: Strained yogurt with cucumber, garlic, and mint.
Sabzi (greens): Fresh herbs and raw vegetables.	Zeytun Parvardeh: Olives in a paste made of pomegranate, walnut and garlic.	Mirza Qasemi: Grilled eggplant with egg, garlic and tomato.	Kashk-e Bademjan: Mixture of kashk, eggplant and mint.
Hummus (Iranian Style): chickpea paste with olive oil and herbs.			

=== Desserts ===
In 400 BC, the ancient Iranians invented a special chilled food, made of rose water and vermicelli, which was served to royalty in summertime. The ice was mixed with saffron, fruits, and various other flavors. Today, one of the most famous Iranian desserts in the semi-frozen noodle dessert known as faloodeh, which has its roots in the city of Shiraz, a former capital of the country. Bastani e zaferani, Persian for "saffron ice cream", is a traditional Iranian ice cream which is also commonly referred to as "the traditional ice cream". Other typical Iranian desserts include several forms of rice, wheat and dairy desserts.

The following is a list of several Iranian desserts.

Fereni: Sweet rice pudding flavored with rose water.	Sholezard: Saffron rice-based dessert.	Halva: Wheat flour and butter, flavored with rose water.	Bastani-e Zaferani: Saffron ice cream.
Faloodeh: Vermicelli mixed in a semi-frozen syrup of sugar and rose water.	Sarshir: Creamy dairy product similar to clotted cream.	Samanu: Germinated wheat, typically served for Nowruz.	Konafeh: Crispy pastry with cheese filling (although loaned from Arabs)

=== Snacks ===
Cookies appear to have their origins in 7th-century Iran, shortly after the use of sugar became relatively common in the region. There are numerous traditional native and adopted types of snack food in modern Iran, of which some are listed within the following table.

Kolucheh: Cookies, with major production in Fuman and Lahijan.	Bamieh: Deep fried dough soaked in sugar syrup.	Baqlava: Pastry made of filo, nuts, and sugar syrup.	Reshte Khoshkar: Fried and spiced rice flour and walnut.
Nougat and Gaz: Made of sugar, nuts, and egg white.	Sohan: Saffron brittle candy with nuts.	Sohan Asali: Brittle candy with honey.	Nan-e Berenji: Rice flour cookies.
Tabrizi Lovuez: Diamond-shaped, made of almond powder, sugar, and saffron.	Nokhodchi: Chickpea cookies.	Qottab: Almond-filled deep-fried pastry.	Kolompeh: Pie made of dates and cardamom.
Nabat: Rock candy, commonly flavored with saffron in Iran.	Pashmak: Cotton candy.	Trail Mix: Dried fruit, grains, and nuts.	Quince Cheese: Made of quince and sugar.
Ajil-e Moshkel-gosha: Traditional packed trail mix for Nowruz.	Gush-e Fil: Deep-fried dough in oil on the right side with persian tea and nabat (saffron rock candy).	Poolaki: Thin candy made of sugar, water, and white vinegar.	Baslogh: Pastry made of grape syrup, starch and almond.

=== Drinks ===
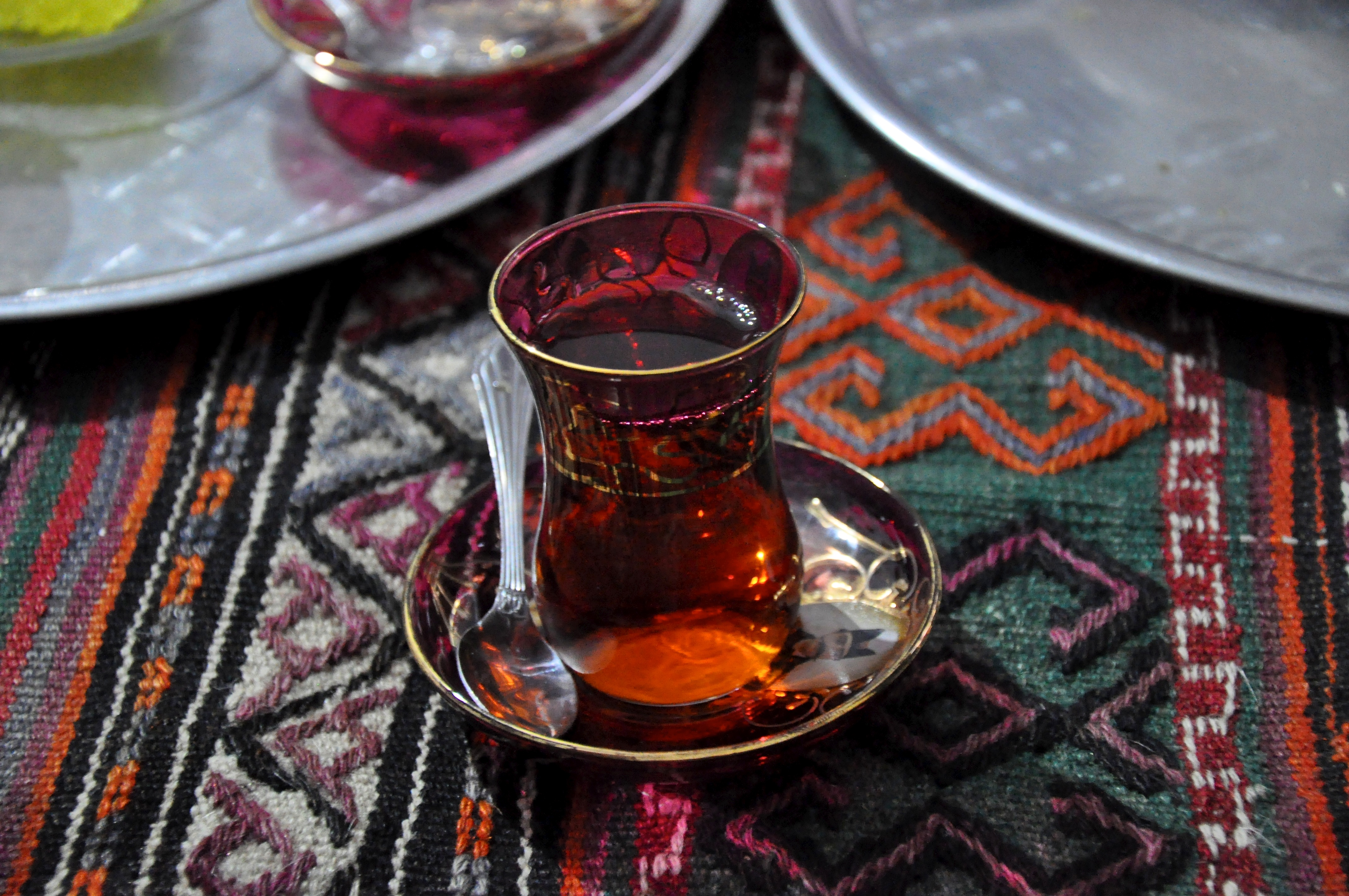
A cup of Iranian tea, served in Tehran

Iran is one of the world's major tea producers, mostly cultivated in its northern regions. In Iranian culture, tea (čāy) is widely consumed and is typically the first thing offered to a guest. Iranians traditionally put a lump of sugar cube in the mouth before drinking the tea. Rock candies are also widely used, typically flavored with saffron.

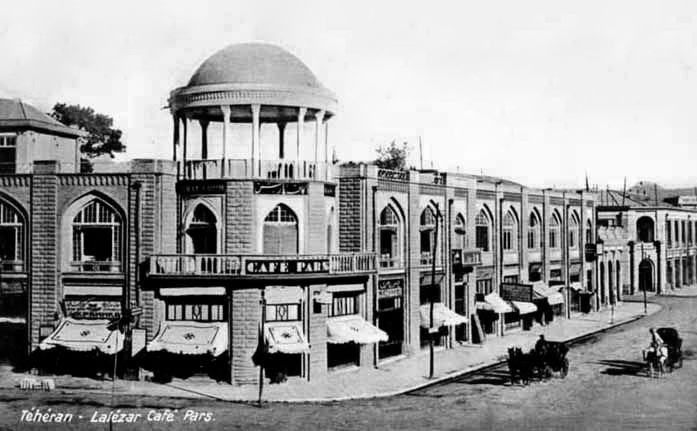
Café Pars, Tehran (1936)

Iran's traditional coffee (qahve, or kāfe) is served strong, sweet, and "booby-trapped with a sediment of grounds". In 16th-century Safavid Iran, coffee was initially used for medical purposes among the society. Traditional coffeehouses were popular gatherings, in which people drank coffee, smoked tobacco, and recited poetry—especially the epic poems of Shahnameh. In present-day Iran, cafés are trendy mostly in urban areas, where a variety of brews and desserts are served. Turkish coffee is also popular in Iran, more specifically among Iranian Azeris.

Wine (mey) has also a significant presence in Iranian culture. Shirazi wine is Iran's historically most famous wine production, originating from the city of Shiraz. By the 9th century, the city of Shiraz had already established a reputation for producing the finest wine in the world, and was Iran's wine capital. Since the 1979 Revolution, alcoholic beverages have been prohibited in Iran; though non-Muslim recognized minorities (i.e. Christians, Jews, and Zoroastrians) are allowed to produce alcoholic beverages for their own use. While non-alcoholic beer (ābjow) is available from legal outlets, other citizens prepare their alcoholic beverages illegally through the minority groups and largely from Iraqi Kurdistan and Turkey.

Araq sagi, literally meaning "doggy distillate", is a type of distilled alcoholic beverage in Iran which contains at least 65% pure ethanol. It is usually produced at homes from raisins, and is similar to Turkish rakı. Prior to the 1979 Revolution, it had been produced traditionally in several cities of Iran. Since it was outlawed following the 1979 Revolution, it has become a black market and underground business.

The following table lists several Iranian cold beverages.

Doogh: Cold yogurt drink, often made with salt, pepper, and other spices.	Pomegranate Juice	Carrot Juice, sometimes mixed with ice cream.	Khakshir: Cold sweet drink with Descurainia sophia seeds.
Sekanjebin: Cold drink made of honey and vinegar.	Aragh Sagi: A type of distilled alcoholic beverage.	Sharbat: Cold and sweet drink made of fruits or flower petals.	Shiraz Wine: Wine produced from Shiraz grapes around the city of Shiraz in Iran.

== Regional Iranian cuisine ==
=== Iranian Azerbaijani cuisine ===
The Iranian Azerbaijani people, living primarily in the region of Azerbaijan in northwestern Iran, have a number of local dishes that include the dumpling dish of joshpara (جوُشپَرا), an offal-based dish named jaqul baqul typically containing liver and heart, a variation of qeyme called pichagh (پیچاق‌قیمه), and a variation of kufte called Tabriz meatballs. The pastry shekerbura (شَکَربورا) is identical to Khorasan's shekarpare (šekarpāre). The food tastes noticeably Iranian, though also with its own unique features, such as using more lemon juice and butter than other groups of Iranians.

=== Balochi cuisine ===
Meat and dates are the main ingredients in the cuisine of Iran's southeastern region of Baluchistan. Rice is primarily cultivated in the region of Makran. Foods specific to Baluchistan include tanurche (tarōnča; tanurče), a local variety of grilled meat prepared in a tanur; doogh-pa (dōq-pâ), a type of khoresh that contains doogh; and tabahag (tabâhag), meat prepared with pomegranate powder. Baluchi cuisine also includes several date-based dishes, as well as various types of bread.

=== Caspian cuisine ===
The southern coast of the Caspian Sea, which consists of the Iranian provinces of Gilan, Mazanderan, Alborz, and Golestan, has a fertile environment that is also reflected in its cuisine. Kateh is a method of cooking rice that originates from this region. This type of rice dish is also eaten there as a breakfast meal, either heated with milk and jam or cold with cheese and garlic. Caviar fish roes also hail from this region, and are typically served with eggs in frittatas and omelettes or eaten simply with lavash and butter. Fish is commonly eaten in the Gilan province, where Caspian kutum is a staple and usually served fried along with rice. Smoked fish (Persian: ماهی دودی, Romanized: Mahi doodi) is also popular in Gilan and usually incorporated into rice by steaming the two together. Local cookies (koluče) of the region are popular desert items, particularly those from the region of Fuman. Another notable dessert from this region is Reshteh khoshkar (Persian: رشته‌خشکار), consisting of fried rice flour dough filled with sugar and nuts. Medlar is also commonly eaten in Gilan and locally referred to as "konos" (Persian: کونوس).

=== Kurdish cuisine ===
The region of Kurdistan in western Iran is home to a variety of local āsh, pilaf, and stew dishes. Some local Kurdish dishes include a traditional grilled rib meat that is called dande kabāb, a type of khoresh made of chives that is called xoreš-e tare, and a dish of rice and potatoes that is called sib polow.

=== Southern Iranian cuisine ===
The food of southern Iran is typically spicy. Mahyawa is a tangy sauce made of fermented fish in this region. Being a coastal region, Khuzestan's cuisine includes especially seafood, as well as some unique local beverages. In southern Khuzestan, there is also a variation of kufte that is known as kibbeh and is made of ground meat, cracked wheat, different types of herbs and vegetables and various spices.

=== Turkmen cuisine ===
Iran's Turkmen people are predominantly centered in the Iranian provinces of Golestan and North Khorasan. Chegderme (čekderme) is a Turkmen dish made of rice, meat, and tomato paste.

== Structure ==
=== Meals ===
==== Breakfast ====
The basic traditional Iranian breakfast consists of a variety of breads such as lavash, taftan and barbari bread; butter cubes; white cheese; whipped heavy cream (sarshir, often sweetened with honey), nuts (especially walnuts) and a variety of fruit jams and spreads.

Many cities and towns across Iran feature their own distinct versions of breakfast dishes. Pache, a popular traditional dish widely eaten in Iran and the neighboring Caucasus, is almost always only served from three in the morning until sometime after dawn, and specialty restaurants (serving only pache) are only open during those hours. Another traditional breakfast dish is haleem, a stew consisting of wheat or barley cooked slowly with lamb and lentils until it reaches a thick, creamy consistency. Omelettes are also widely enjoyed, a dish hailing from ancient Persia; popular additions are spinach, sausages, tomatoes, or dates.

==== Lunch and dinner ====
Traditional Iranian cooking is performed in stages, often requiring hours to days of preparation and attention. The outcome is a well-balanced array of dishes, matching flavour with nutritional content. Major staples of Iranian food usually eaten with every meal include rice, an assortment of fresh herbs with radishes (sabzi khordan), white cheese, a variety of breads, and some form of meat, whether braised slowly or grilled. The most popularly consumed meats are lamb, poultry, beef, and fish, the latter consumed most in coastal regions. Khoresh, or a braise, served with rice is by far the most popular dish, of which there are myriad options, the constitution of which vary by region.

=== Traditional table setting and etiquette ===
Traditional Iranian table setting firstly involves the tablecloth, called sofre, and is spread out over either a table or a rug. Main dishes are concentrated in the middle, surrounded by smaller dishes containing appetizers, condiments, and side dishes, all of which are nearest to the diners. When the food is perfectly served, an invitation is made to seat at the sofre and start having the meal.

In Persian culture, guests are considered divine and so are served first and abundantly so, the host serving themselves last. Taarof, the Persian art of etiquette, dictates that guests do not help themselves to any food or drink unless offered to do so, and even having been offered must decline until having received at least a third offer, lest they appear greedy. This demonstration of restraint and good manners is met with the generosity of the host, who will insist on multiple servings for their guests. In certain circles, it may be considered polite to leave a tiny amount of food or drink behind, lest the host interpret an empty plate or cup as suggestive of the meagreness of their hospitality.

== See also ==
- List of Iranian foods
- Mazanderani cuisine
- Kurdish cuisine
- Azerbaijani cuisine
- Nimatnama-i-Nasiruddin-Shahi, a medieval Indian Persian-language cookbook
