= Ajil =

Ajil may refer to:

- Ajil (town), Malaysia
- Ajil (state constituency), Malaysia
- Ajil, Iranian trail mix, such as Ajîl-e Moshkel-goshâ
