= Caspian cuisine =

Regional cuisine in Iran

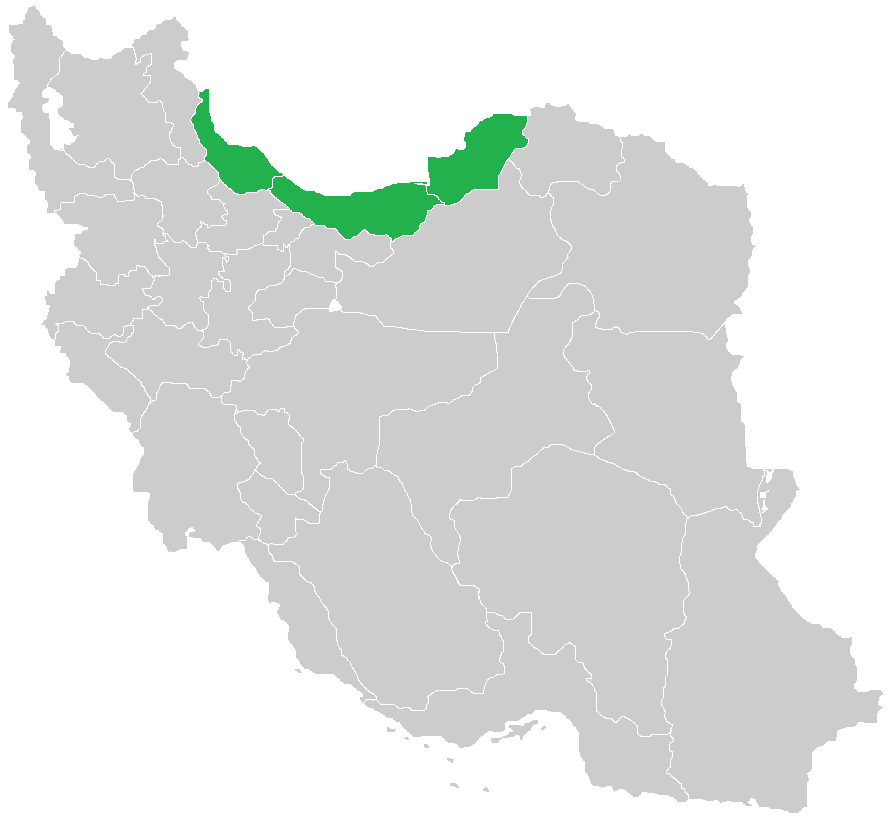
Northern Iran map

Caspian cuisine is a regional cuisine found in Northern Iran, primarily found in the Mazandaran, Gilan, Alborz, and Golestan provinces. The recipes are diverse, just like the region's landscape. Nature in the Mazandaran region of Iran is distinct and varied sections with a mixture of coastal, plains, prairies, forests, and rainforests. The Mazandarani cuisine of coastal regions is very different from that of mountainous regions since people settled in the Alborz usually use indigenous herbs, while coastal populations prepare dishes using local fish and Caspian (Mazan) rice with vegetables.

== History ==
Mazandaran Province lies to the east of the Iranian province of Gilan. The southern coast of the Caspian Sea is sometimes referred to as the "fertile Caspian provinces". Citrus fruit, specifically orange crops are grown in this region and influence the cuisine. Historically in Iran, rice is a common food only in the Mazandaran and Gilan Provinces, which is prepared in this region in a kateh cooking style, unlike the typical polos/chelo found in other parts of Iran. Rice crops are grown in the sloping regions of the Alborz mountain range, part of which is in the Mazandaran Province. Seafood is a strong component for coastal Mazandarani cuisine and present in many meals. Persian caviar (ḵāvīar) is incorporated in dishes and often served with egg dishes (some of which are similar to a frittata or omelette). Between 1400 until 1870, the Mazandaran Province was the only place cultivating sugarcane, and it was sometimes eaten with bread and rice.

Some local, wild herbs used in Mazandarani cuisine include zolang, anarijeh, ouji, sersem. Outside of the Mazandaran Province, these local herbs are not known to many people. It's thought by some that certain local dishes and herbs could be used as health remedies for an illness and as a result, various scholars come yearly to Mazandaran province to research these wild, indigenous herbs and regional dishes. Stinging nettles are found throughout the province during springtime and a Mazandarani nettle soup is made from them, the nettles are said to have medicinal properties as a blood tonic and to improve hay fever.

== List of select northern Iranian dishes ==
This is a list of northern Iranian regional dishes, primarily found in the Mazandaran, Gilan, Alborz, and Golestan provinces. Due to the landscape, seasons and native plants, these regions have similar traditional dishes but have a distinct culinary history from the other provinces in Iran.

- Aghouze-Messeama
- Dewpetti
- Ispina-Saek
- Khali Aush (Keahi-Esh, soup/stew)
- Naz Khatun (Naz-Xatune)
- Ispinej-Mearji
- Keahi-Heali
- Mirza Ghasemi
- Baghali ghatogh (bean stew) – typically made in Iran with a bean called "pacheh baghali" (Rashti fava beans), but outside of Iran this is made with either lima beans, kidney beans or fava beans. This dish can be found in all northern regions of Iran, but associated with Mazandaran and Gilan provinces.
- Kateh (rice cooked in water) – this is typical of Northern Iran (Mazandaran, Gilan and Golestan provinces), this rice is made with more water, butter and salt, in a specific cooking technique.
- Keshmesh polo (raisins in rice) – found all over Iran now, but originated in northern Iran.
- Khoresh-e gol dar chaman (broad bean stew) – a stew made of garlic, dill, lamb and broad beans. An alternative to using broad beans in this recipe are fava beans.
- Khoresh-e torsh tareh (stew of herbs, garlic, eggs).
- Kuku eshpel (a kuku egg dish made of fish roe or caviar).
- Morgh-e torsh (sour chicken).
- Sirabij (scrambled eggs with chopped and fried garlic leaves) found in Mazandaran and Gilan provinces.
- Sir Anar (translates to "garlic pomegranate") – a stew or sauce used for proteins.

=== Desserts and sweets ===
- Aghouzenoon
- Peshtizik
- Pisgendela
- Nesseri
- Kunak
- Tunsernun
- Red sugar (Serkh seker)
- Reshteh Khoshkar

== Drinks ==
Mazanderani and Gilani traditional wines have historically been made from wild, local grapes.

Mazanderani people used to drink narenj vehar, a traditional wine drink, after hard labor, particularly during summer and the month of Merdal in the Tabarian calendar. It is a cold drink which is believed to replenish the drinkers' energy reserves.

== See also ==
- Iranian cuisine
- Mazandarani people
