= Kateh =

Iranian rice dish

Kateh (Persian: کته) is an Iranian rice dish from the Caspian region of Iran. Unlike polo, or cholo, kateh is sticky and does not have tahdig (the rice, bread or potato crust at the bottom), though it does form a crust on the bottom where the salt and oil collect. Generally, kateh needs half the cooking time of polo-style rice and has a denser flavor due to the addition of butter or oil in the cooking process.

Kateh is considered generally the simplest Iranian rice as the ease and speed of cooking makes it popular for casual dinners. It is sometimes referred to as "everyday rice". It is also a traditional dish of Caspian cuisine and found in the Mazandaran, and Gilan provinces.

== See also ==
- Iranian cuisine
- List of rice dishes
