= Nan-e Nokhodchi =

Food originating from Qazvin, Iran

Shirini Nokhodchi
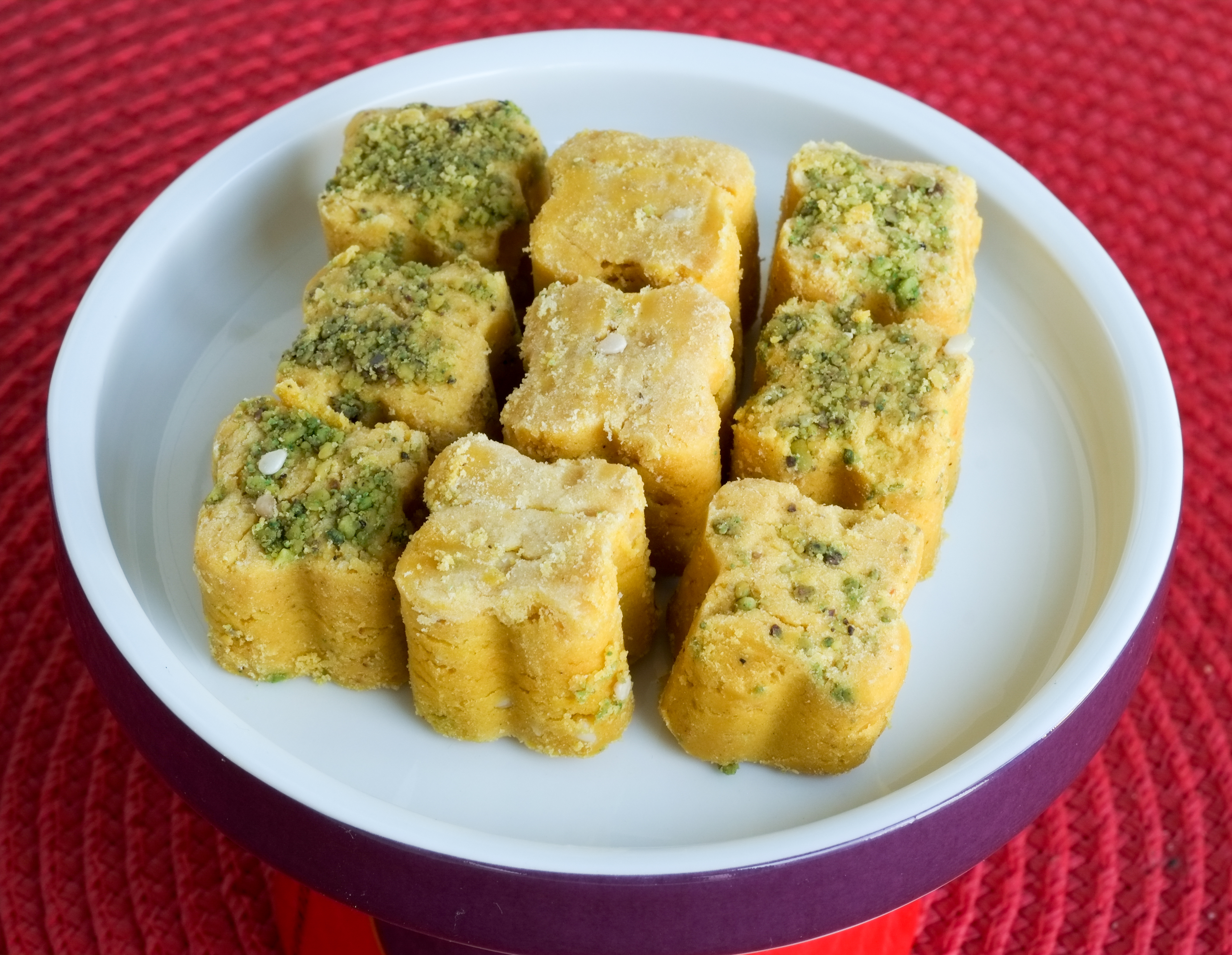
- Shirini-e Nokhodchi
- Type: Shortbread
- Place of origin: Iran
- Main ingredients: Chickpea flour, sugar, pistachio, cardamom

Nan-e nokhodchi (Persian: نان نخودچی), also called Shirini-e nokhodchi (شیرینی نخودچی), are cookies made from chickpeas originating in Qazvin, Iran. These are traditionally made from chick-pea flour and flavored with cardamom and garnished with pistachio. They come in varying shapes.

== Etymology ==
Nan-e Nokhodchi means "bread of/with chickpea" in Persian. Shirini Nokhodchi means "chickpea cookie" in Persian.

== Shape ==
Some say they are traditionally cut into the shape of a clover, while others say that the traditional shape is modeled after a hazelnut with etched designs. They are also now made into squares, hearts and diamonds.

== Seven Sweets ==
According to legend, King Jamshid discovered sugar on the Persian new year, Nowruz. Therefore, there is the custom of celebrating Nowruz with seven sweet foods, in addition to the traditional other seven foods at the Haft-sin. The seven sweets are:

- Noghl, sugar-coated almonds flavored with rose water
- Persian Baklava, pistachio almond pastry
- nan-e berenji, rice cookies
- Nan-e badami, almond cookies
- Nan-e nokhodchi, chickpea cookies
- Sohan asali, honey almonds
- Nan-e gerdui, walnut cookies
