= Khosrow and Ridag =

Work of Middle Persian literature about Sassanid culture

Khosrow Ghobadan and Ridak (Shah Khosrow and Ridak) also known as Khosrow and Ridag (خسرو و ریدگ), is a work of Middle Persian literature in Pahlavi with details about Sasanian culture in the era of Khosrow II (known as Khosrow Parviz (خسرو پرویز) in the story).

In the story, a young man called Ridak (ریدگ) stands before the king seeking a position. He is asked 13 questions by the king. Ridak is less a name than a description of position; it meant a servant or a young boy who served the elders and nobles. His answers form the treatise.

At the beginning of Ridak's treatise, he said to Khosrow Parviz that he was from a prosperous family and that his father had died at a young age and his mother more recently. However, due to his father's inheritance, he was able to go to school (academy) and obtain the necessary religious information and become a teacher, and then become skilled in riding, shooting, spearing, music, astronomy, and various games. After this introduction, he asks the king to test him, and the king asks thirteen questions about the best foods and fruits and what they ate, songs, flowers and perfumes, and women and horses, etc., and all his answers are to his liking. To test his audacity, the king then asks him to capture alive the two lions that frightened the king's herds. After succeeding in this task, Ridak is appointed to the position of border guard.

From this treatise, it is possible to understand the taste of the Sasanian aristocracy and the extent of the glory of Khosrow Parviz's court, as well as information about the state of education in the Sassanid era. This treatise is important in terms of including the names of foods and how to prepare them, flowers, instruments, games, etc.

The Arabic translation of parts of this treatise is given by Abu Mansour Tha'labi. The text of this treatise has been published in the collection of Pahlavi texts . This treatise has also been translated into modern Persian.

An English translation was made as part of a larger (not identified) work, by Darab Dastur Peshotan Sanjana. The untranslated originals are included in the collection of Pahlavi texts of Jamasb Asana.
