= Qottab =

Deep-fried Iranian almond pastry

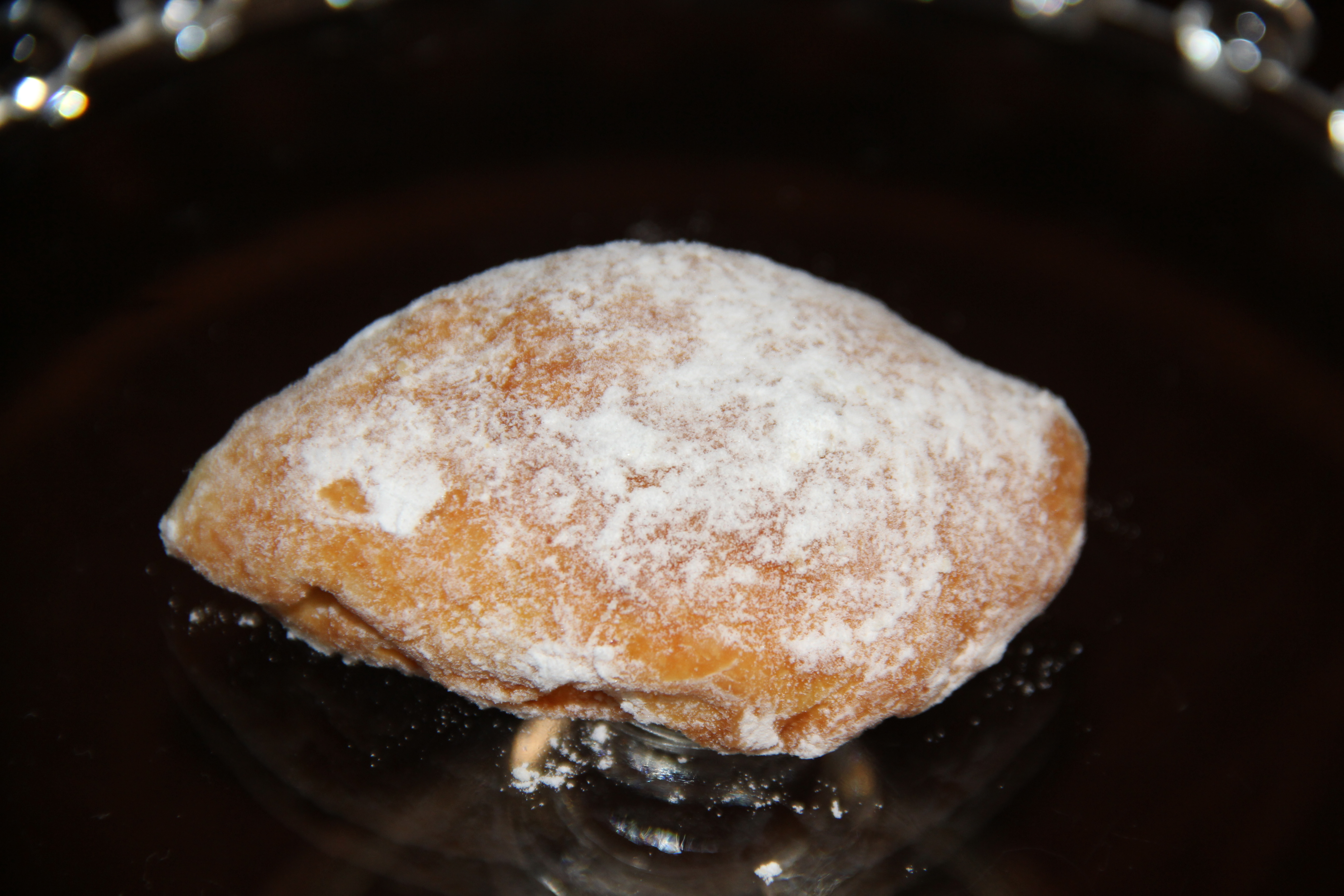
- Type: Turnover
- Place of origin: Iran
- Region or state: Yazd
- Main ingredients: Flour, almonds, powdered sugar, vegetable oil, cardamom

Qottab (Persian: قطاب qottâb) is an almond-filled deep-fried Iranian cuisine turnover, prepared with flour, almonds, powdered sugar, vegetable oil, and cardamom. In some cases, ground walnuts are substituted for almonds. The city of Yazd is well known for its qottab, which is commonly prepared during the Persian new year (Nowruz).

Qottab developed from an earlier savoury turnover known as sanbosag, the ancestor of the Ethiopian sambusa and the South Asian samosa. Since the 16th century, the original savoury form of sanbosag has become rare outside of the region of Laristan and the Persian Gulf Coast.

== See also ==
- Gosh-e fil
- Qutab
