= Nan-e berenji =

Iranian rice-flour cookie

Nan-e Berenji
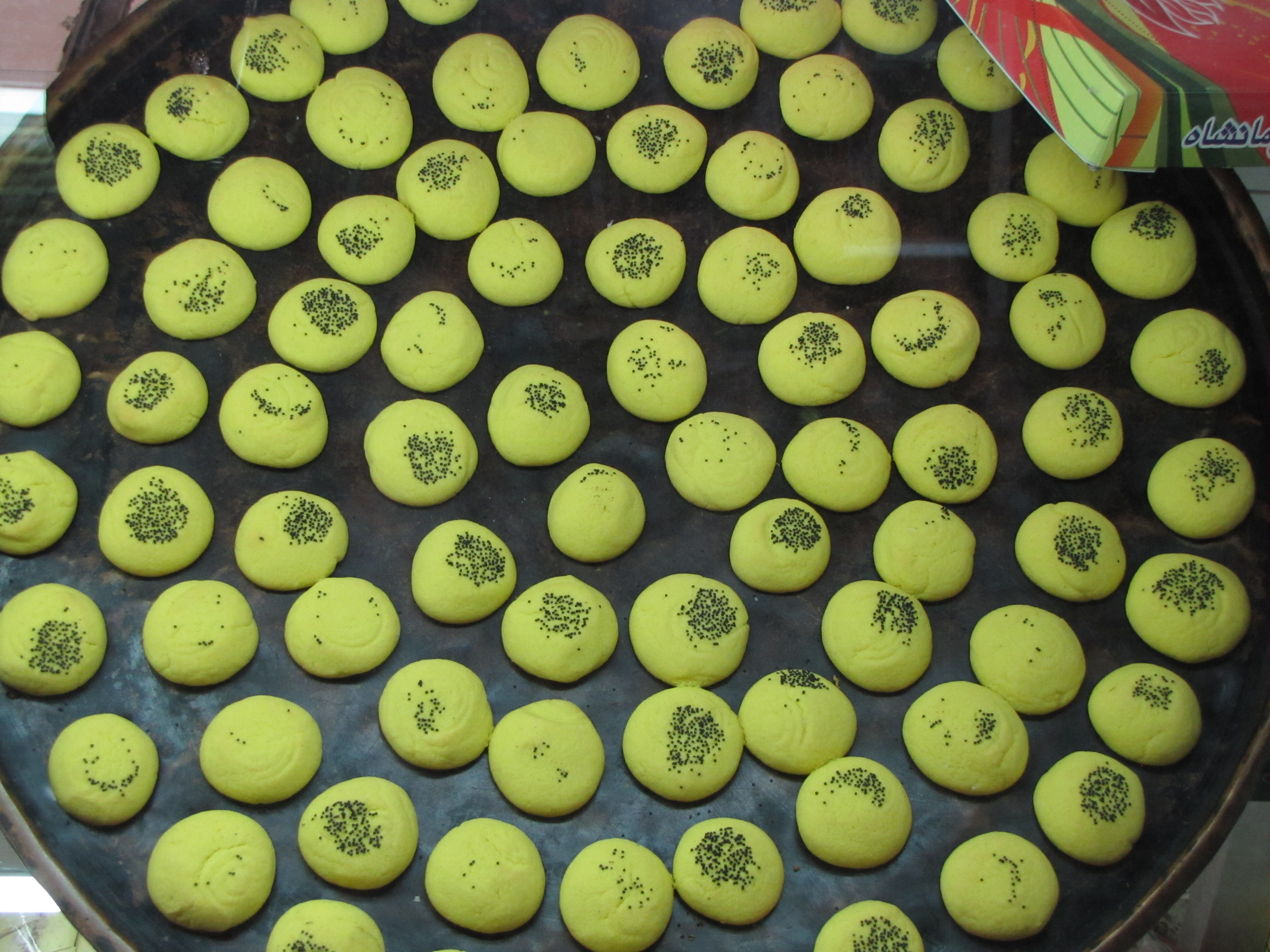
- Type: Cookie
- Place of origin: Iran
- Region or state: Kermanshah
- Main ingredients: Rice flour, Sugar, Egg, Cardamom, Clarified butter

Nan-e berenji (Persian: نان برنجی), or Nan-berenji (نان‌برنجی), also called shirini-e berenji (شیرینی برنجی), is an Iranian rice-flour cookie originating from Kermanshah. Nan-e berenji literally translates to "rice bread". It is often flavored with cardamom, garnished with poppy seeds and formed into flat disks. They are usually white, but sometimes tinted yellow.

== History ==
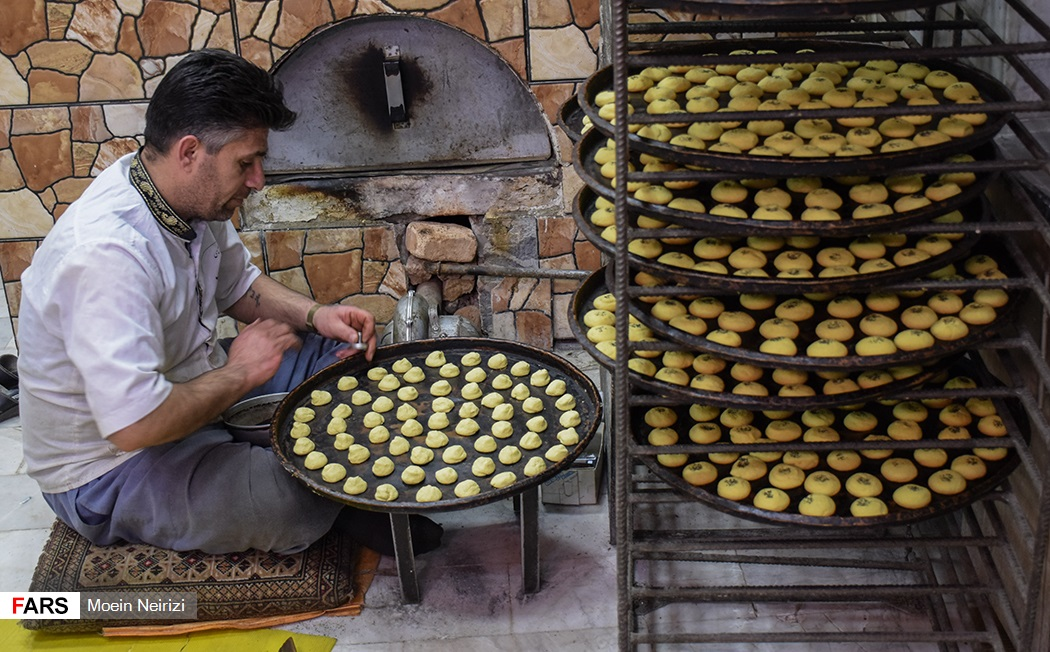
Making nan-e berenji

Nan-e berenji dates back 150 years ago during the Qajar period. Travelers and pilgrims to and from Kermanshah on the Silk Road were looking for specific food which would last longer and also contain nutrients. In response, locals made sweets with rice, which was the leading food of the travelers.

== Seven Sweets ==
According to legend, King Jamshid discovered sugar on the Persian new year, Nowruz. Therefore, there is the custom to celebrate Nowruz with seven sweet foods, in addition to the traditional other seven foods at the Haft-sin. The seven sweets are:

- noghl, sugar-coated almonds
- Persian baklava, pistachio almond pastry
- nan-e berenji, rice cookies
- nan-e badami, almond cookies
- nan-e nokhodchi, chick-pea cookies
- sohan asali, honey almonds
- nan-e gerdui, walnut cookies

== Gallery ==
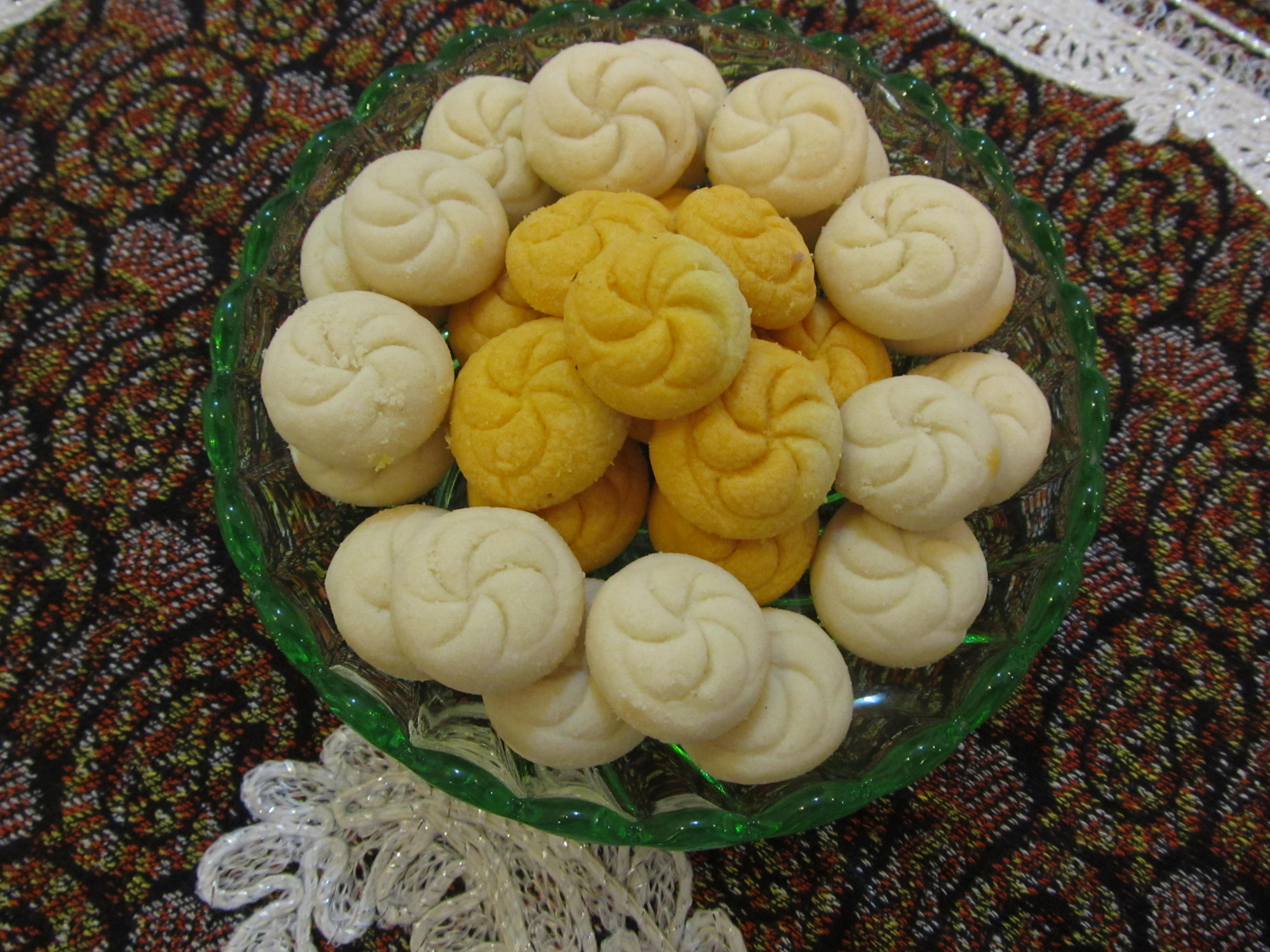

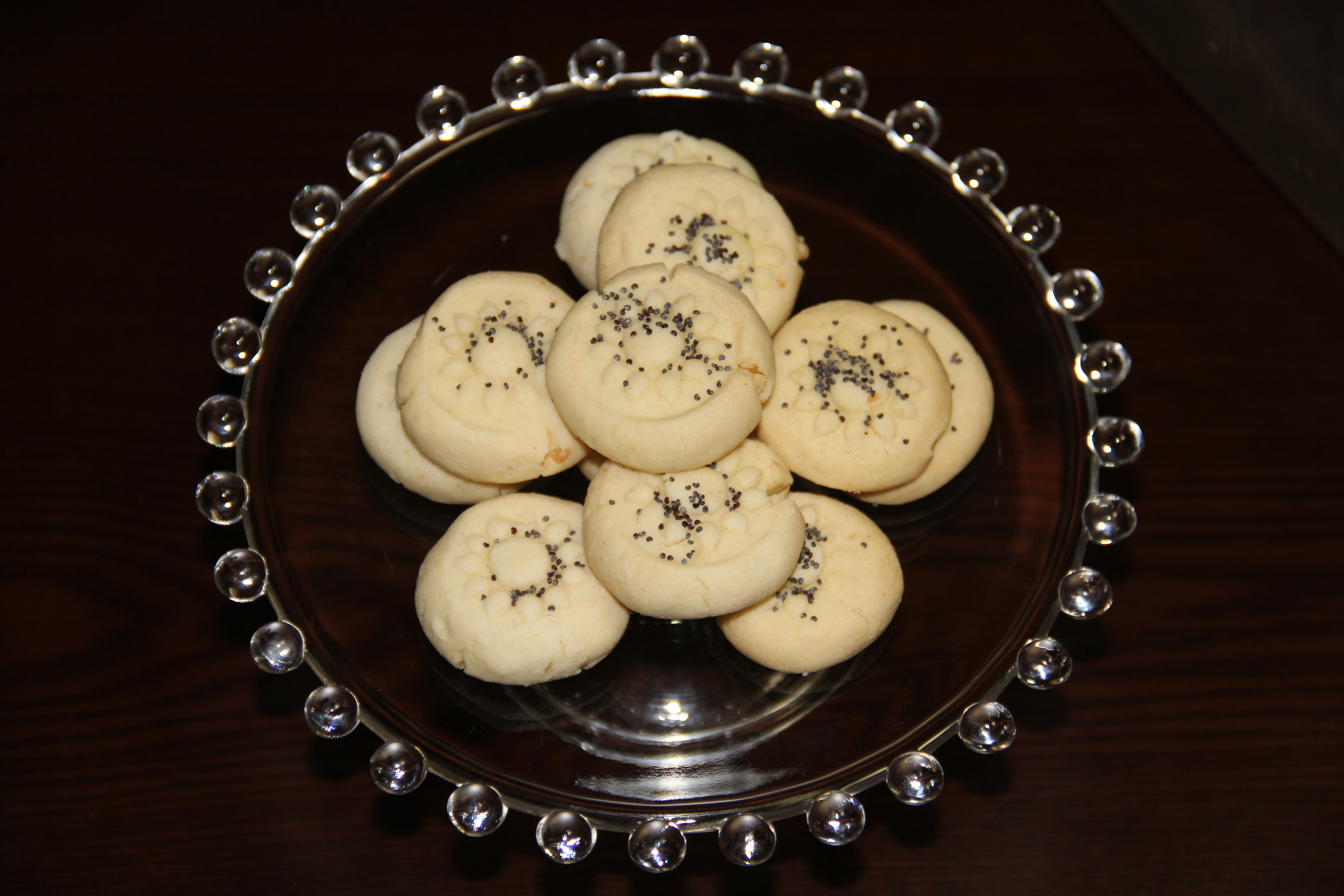

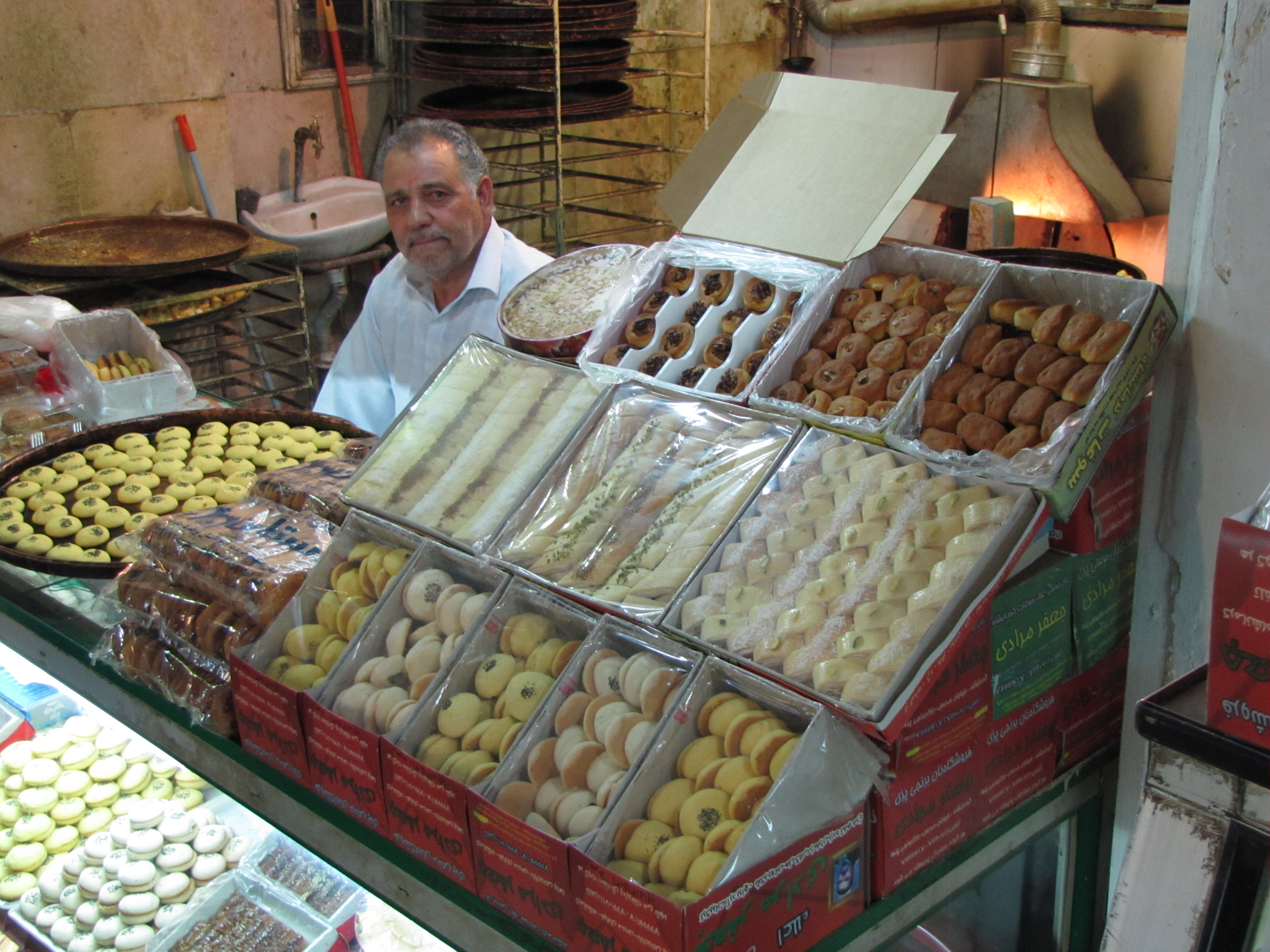

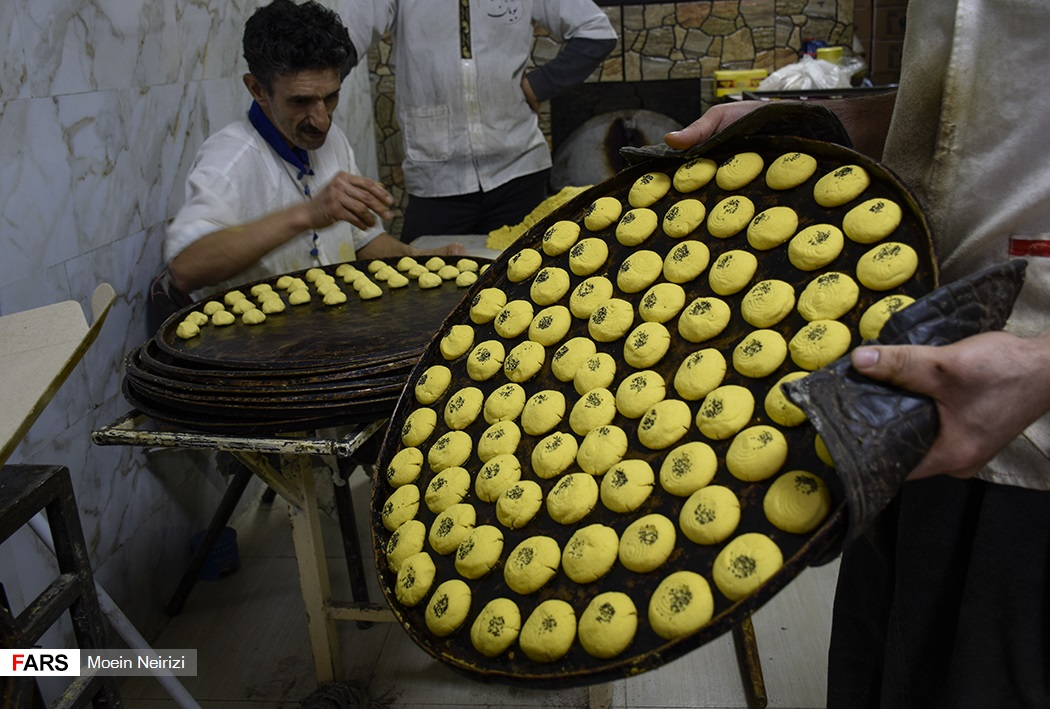
