= Lentil rice =

Well-known Persian dish in Iran

lentil rice عدس پلو
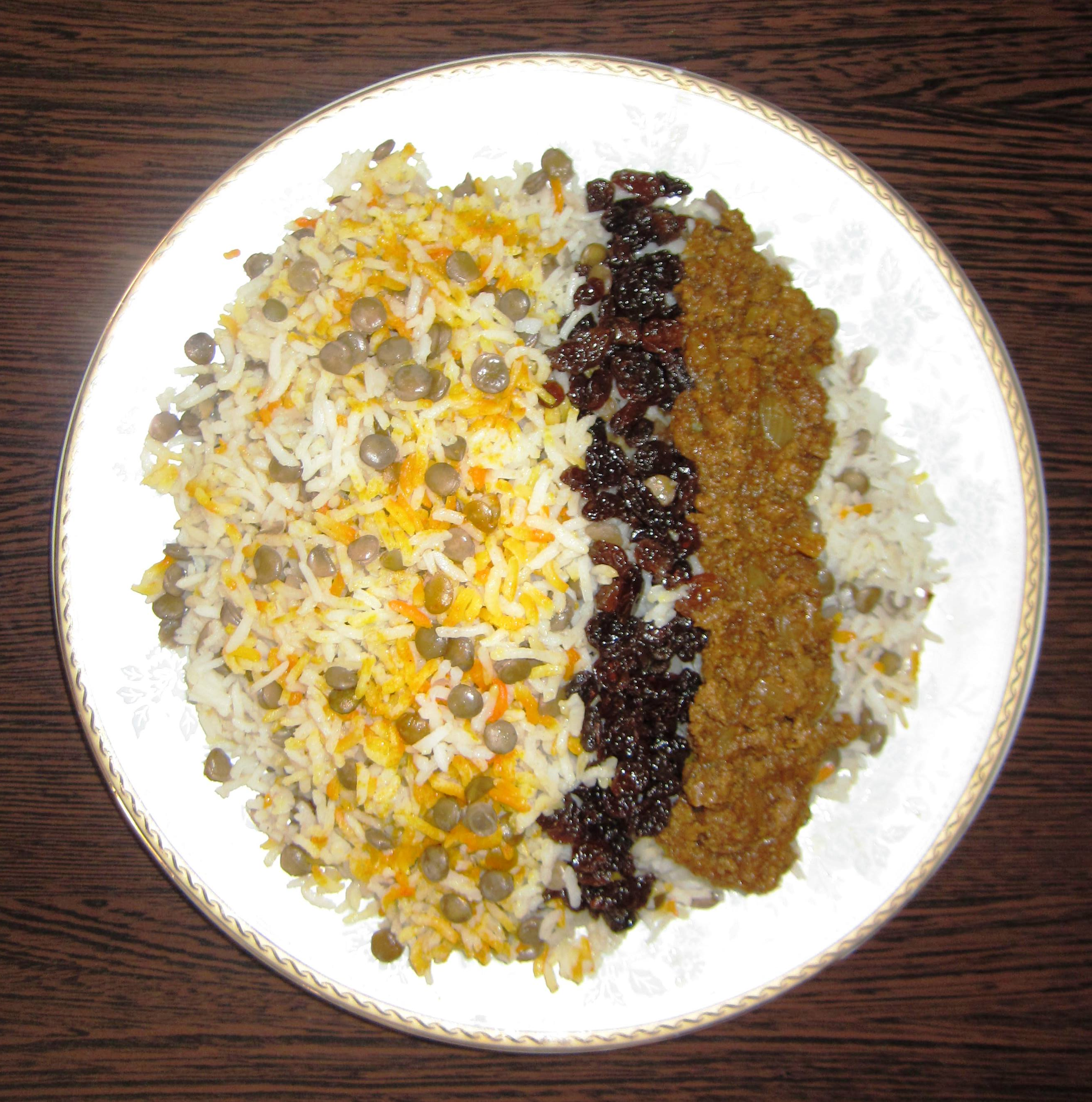
- Adas polo
- Course: Main course
- Place of origin: Iran
- Serving temperature: Hot
- Main ingredients: White rice, Lentils. raisin (seedless), water, salt

Lentil rice (Persian: عدس‌پلو(pronounced: adas polo) is a well-known Persian dish in Iran. It is almost always cooked with raisins and sometimes served with dates or meat.
