= Zeytoon parvardeh =

Iranian olive pomegranate dish

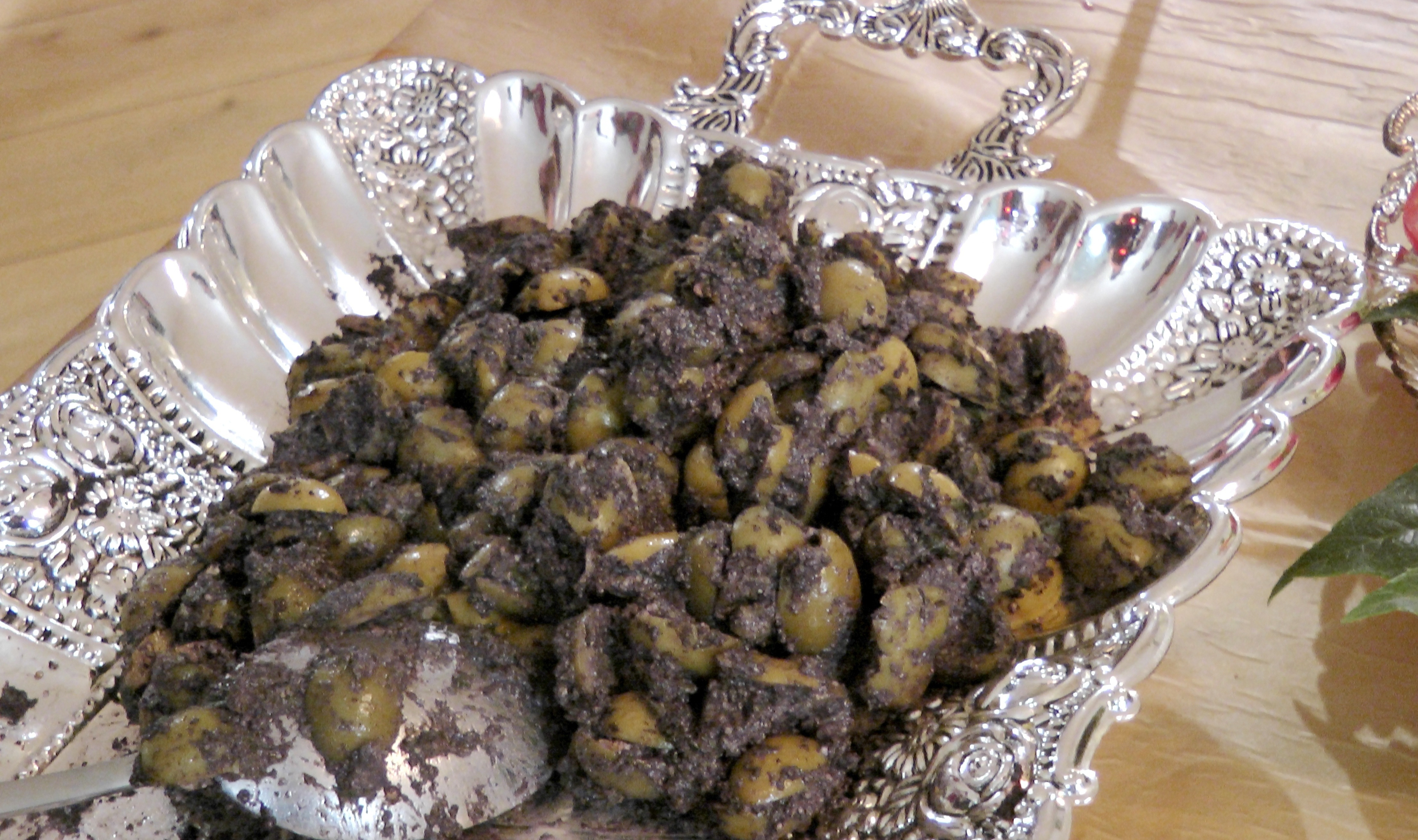
- A dish of zeytoon parvardeh
- Alternative names: Processed olives Cultivated olives Marinated olives
- Course: Hors d'oeuvre
- Place of origin: Iran
- Region or state: Gilan
- Serving temperature: cold
- Main ingredients: Pitted olives, pomegranate molasses, walnut

Zeytoon parvardeh (Persian: زیتون پرورده, romanized: zeytun parvarde, lit. 'processed olives') is an Iranian appetizer made from olives and its place of origin is Gilan province. It is served cold as a condiment with the main dish.

This combination of olives, pomegranate molasses, walnuts, garlic, mint, blue eryngo, and parsley can be found industrially or homemade in Iran.

== See also ==
- Iranian cuisine
- Rasht
