= Shirin polo =

Persian celebratory rice dish

Shirin polo (Persian wedding rice)
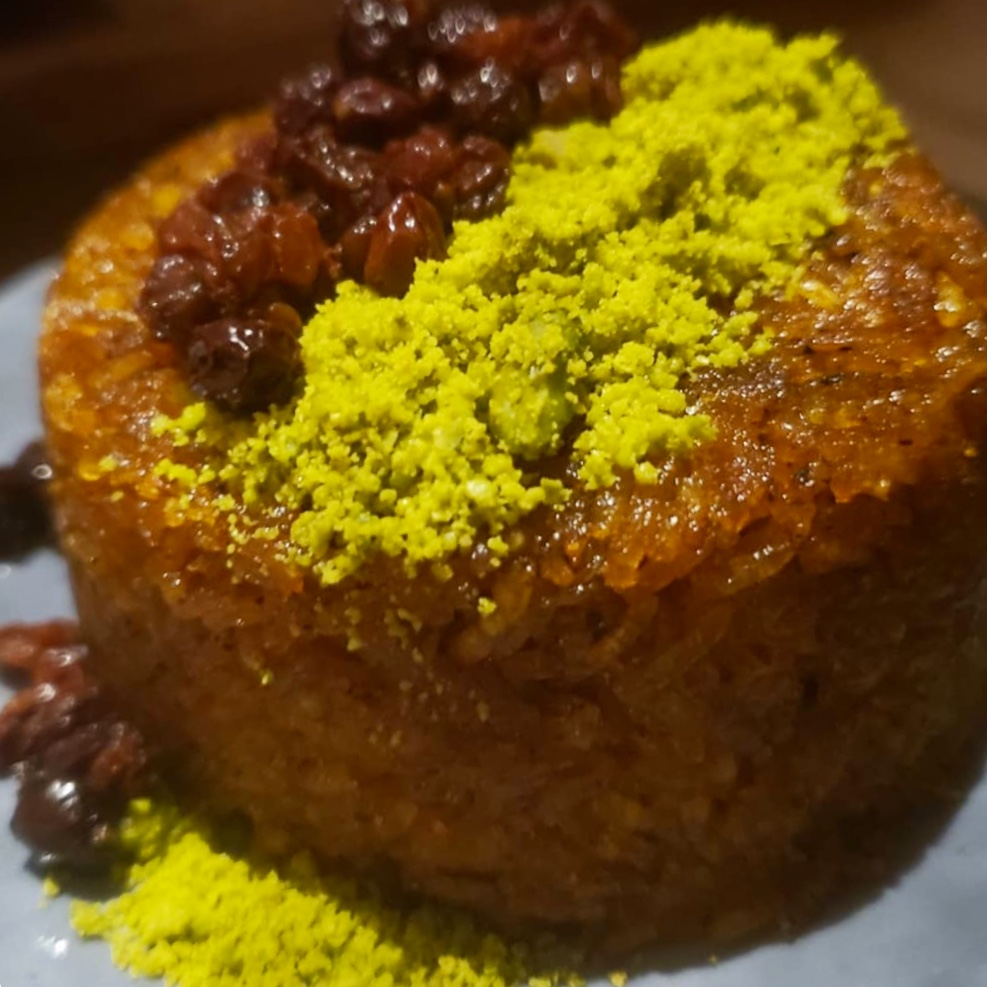
- Shirin polo topped with dried barberries and crushed pistachios
- Alternative names: Persian wedding rice, Purim rice, Rosh Hashanah rice
- Type: Pilaf
- Course: Side dish
- Place of origin: Iran
- Region or state: Shiraz
- Serving temperature: Hot
- Main ingredients: Long-grain rice, water, salt, saffron or turmeric, nuts, dried fruits

Shirin polo, also commonly known as Persian wedding rice or Rosh Hashanah rice, is a traditional Persian rice pilaf that is commonly served to mark special occasions such as weddings. It is a simplified version of morassa' polō, lit. 'jeweled rice'.

In the Persian Jewish community worldwide, it is often associated with holidays such as Purim, Pesach, Rosh Hashanah and the high holidays. It is served as iftar during Ramadan.

== Overview ==
Shirin polo is typically served at celebrations such as weddings, birthdays, and holidays. It is steamed rice in the Persian style topped with nuts and dried fruits such as barberries, apricots, and dates.

== Preparation ==
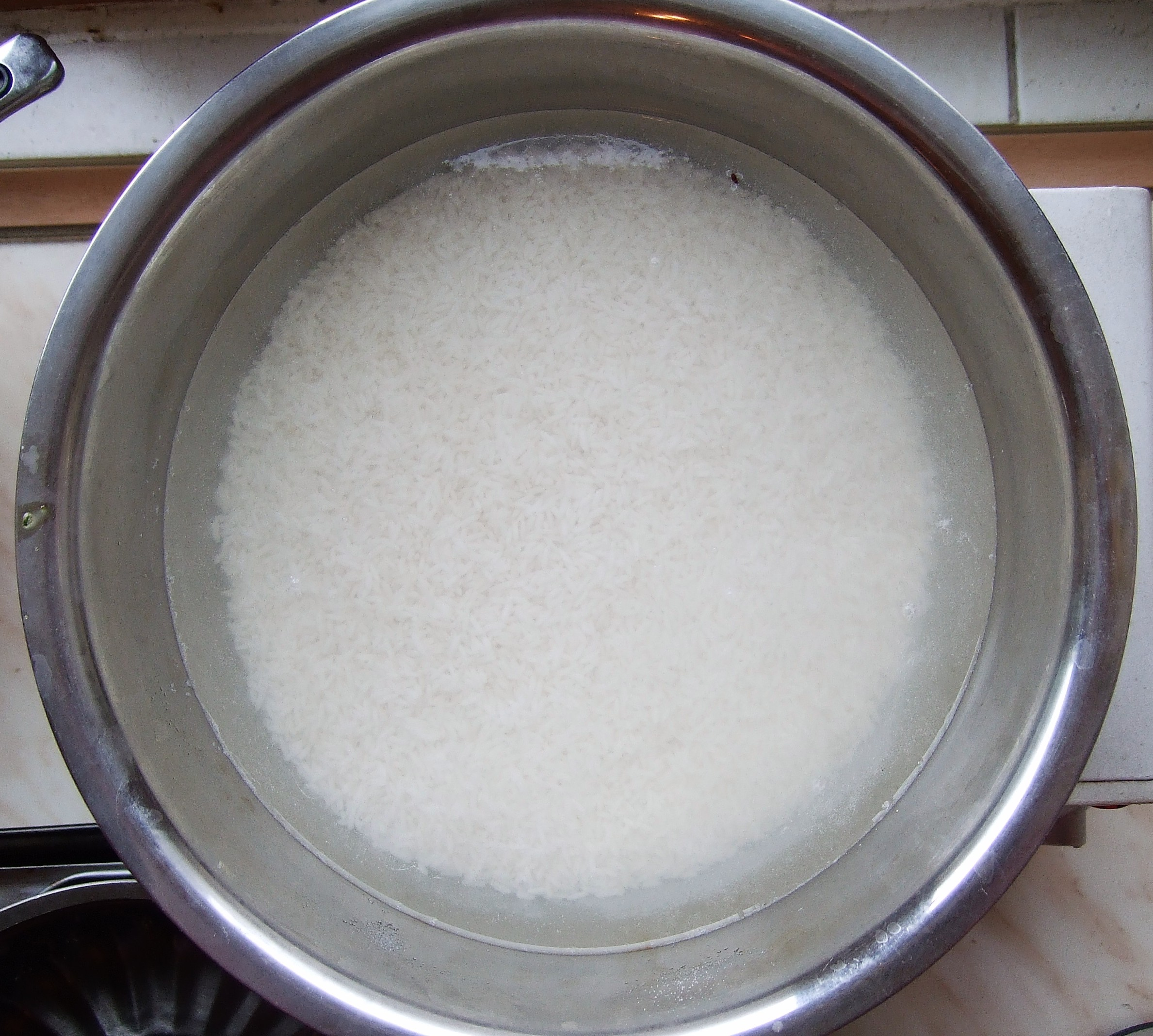
Rice soaking for shirin polo

Shirin polo is typically prepared in the usual Persian way: soaking and boiling, then draining and steaming after mixing it with cooking oil, saffron or turmeric, and other spices and seasoning. Sometimes it is prepared with a crispy crust, tahdig. When it is cooked, it is unmoulded onto a serving platter with tahdig as a garnish. It is then topped with dried fruits, such as apricots, barberries, dates, prunes, and nuts such as pistachio, almond, walnut, or hazelnuts, and sometimes orange peel. The dried fruits and nuts may be left whole or chopped.

== Serving ==
Shirin polo is often served with spiced baked chicken.

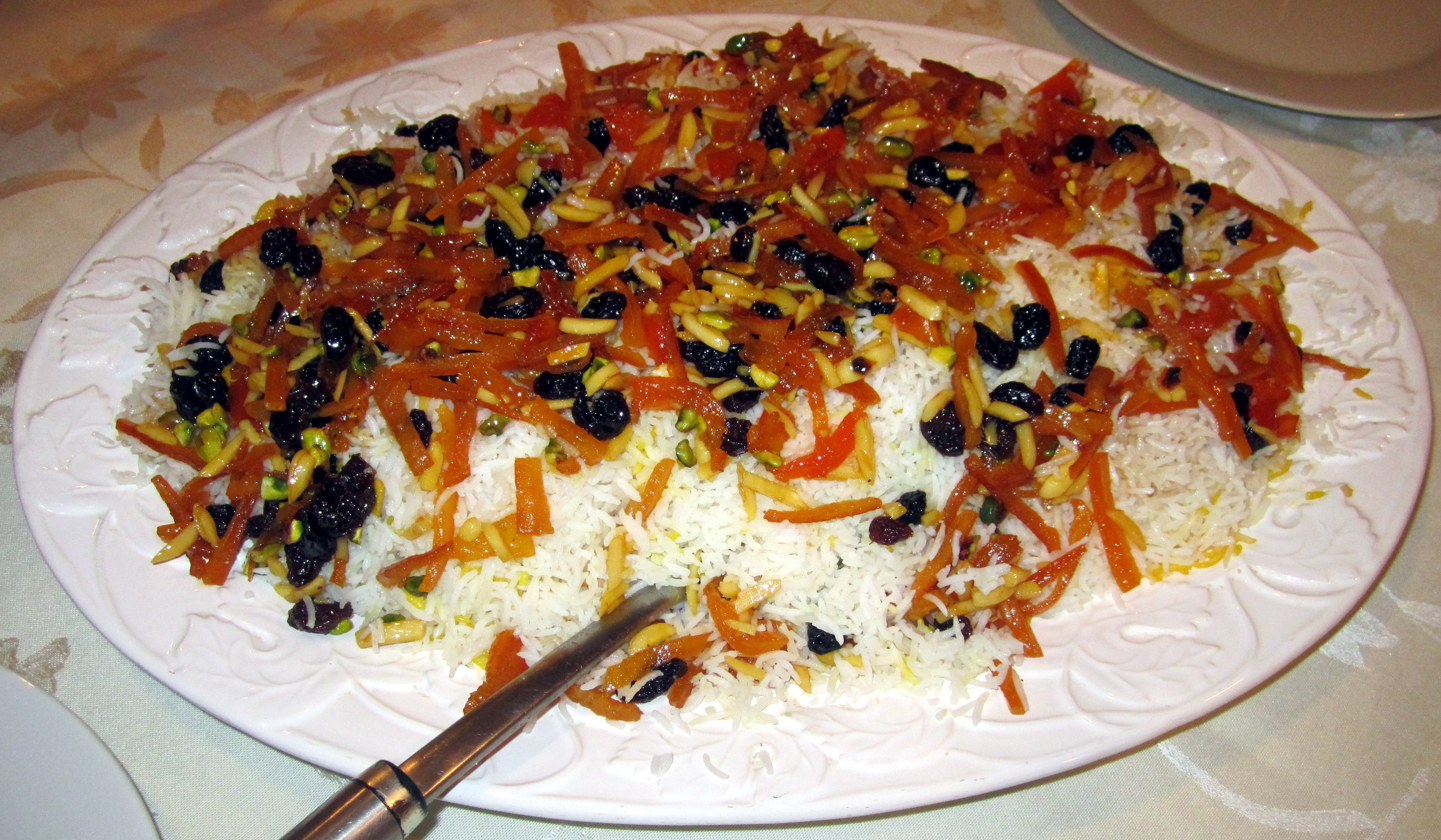
Shirin polo with candied orange peel

== See also ==
- List of rice dishes
