= Tabrizi Lovuez =

Diamond-shape almond dish

Qurabiya
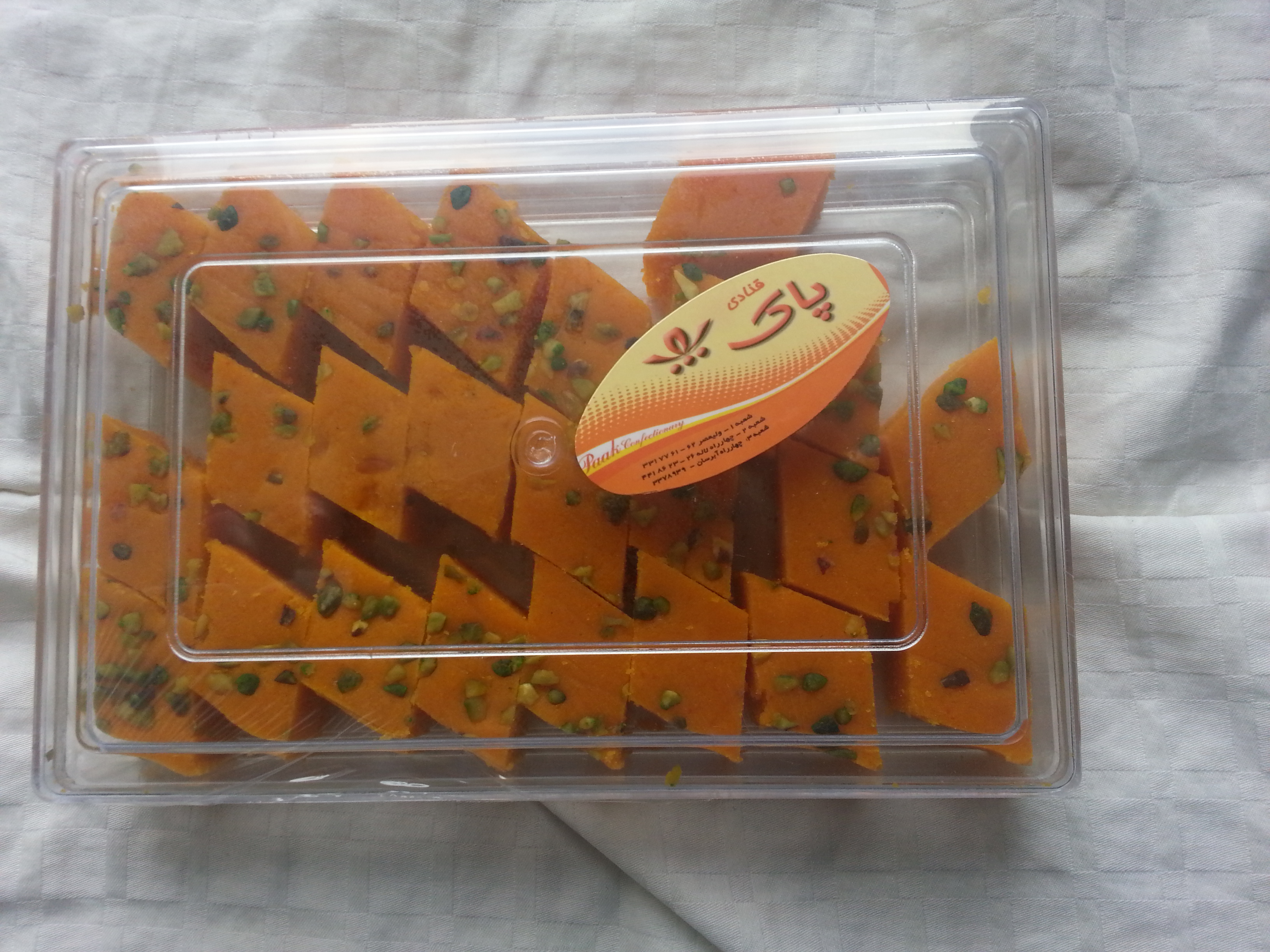
- Lovuez of Tabriz
- Type: Shortbread
- Place of origin: Iran
- Region or state: Iranian Azerbaijan
- Main ingredients: Almond flour, sugar, egg white, vanilla
- Variations: Kourabiedes, mantecado, polvorón, pan de polvo
- Similar dishes: ghoriba; polvorón

Tabrizi Lovuez (Persian: لوز تبریزی, romanized: Loz-e Tabrizi, lit. 'Tabriz Diamonds'), also known as Tabrizi Qurabiya (Azerbaijani: تبریز قورابیسی, romanized: Təbriz Qurabiyəsi), are diamond-shaped confectioneries from Tabriz, a provincial capital in Northwest of Iran. Its main ingredients are sugar, almond powder, and saffron.

== Recipe ==
Mix water and sugar and let them boil while mixing continuously. Next, add saffron and stop heating the syrup. Mix the syrup in a way that it loses the glass-like appearance. Add almond powder little by little to the syrup while mixing it. Stop adding the powder once the mixture forms a paste similar to a viscous pulp that doesn't stick. Unfold waxed paper into a baking tray and evenly pour the pulp, then sprinkle nuts on the surface of the Lovz and push them down. Refrigerate for about three to four hours. Then, cut the Lovz cookies in diamond shapes.

== See also ==
- List of almond dishes
