= Sirabij =

Iranian egg dish

Sirabij is a traditional egg dish from northern Iran in the Gilan Province and Mazandaran Province.

== About ==
It consists of egg and chopped garlic leaves, depending on the season they may be green garlic leaves. The garlic leaves are chopped and fried with oil in a pan and afterwards, the eggs are added and scrambled. Spices are also added in, including salt, pepper and turmeric.

Garlic plants grow in different areas of northern Iran. Green garlic leaves are separately marketed, especially in spring when they are fresh and fragrant.

== See also ==
- Caspian cuisine
