= Poolaki =

Certain sort of candy typically made in Iran

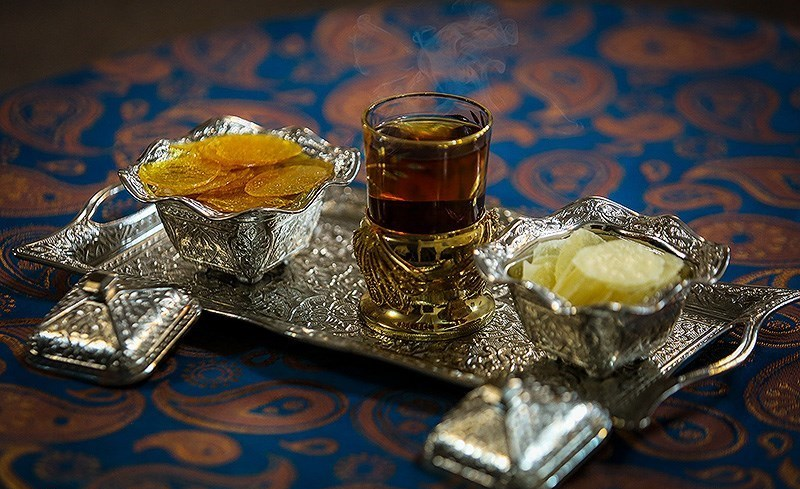
- Poolaki in Persian tea and Persian dishes and cups
- Type: Confectionery
- Place of origin: Iran
- Region or state: Isfahan
- Main ingredients: Sugar, water, white vinegar, natural flavours (saffron, dried lime or cocoa powder)

Poolaki (Persian: پولکی), commonly called pooleki, is a type of candy made mainly in Isfahan, Iran. Its shape is in the form of a thin disc, similar to a thin coin, which starts dissolving as it enters the mouth. It is made of sugar, water, white vinegar and some natural taste of saffron, dried lime or cocoa powder. It is similar to toffee. Poolaki is similar to the word "Poolak" which means "small coin" in Persian. Poolaki is also a Persian surname.
