= Reshteh khoshkar =

Iranian cookie

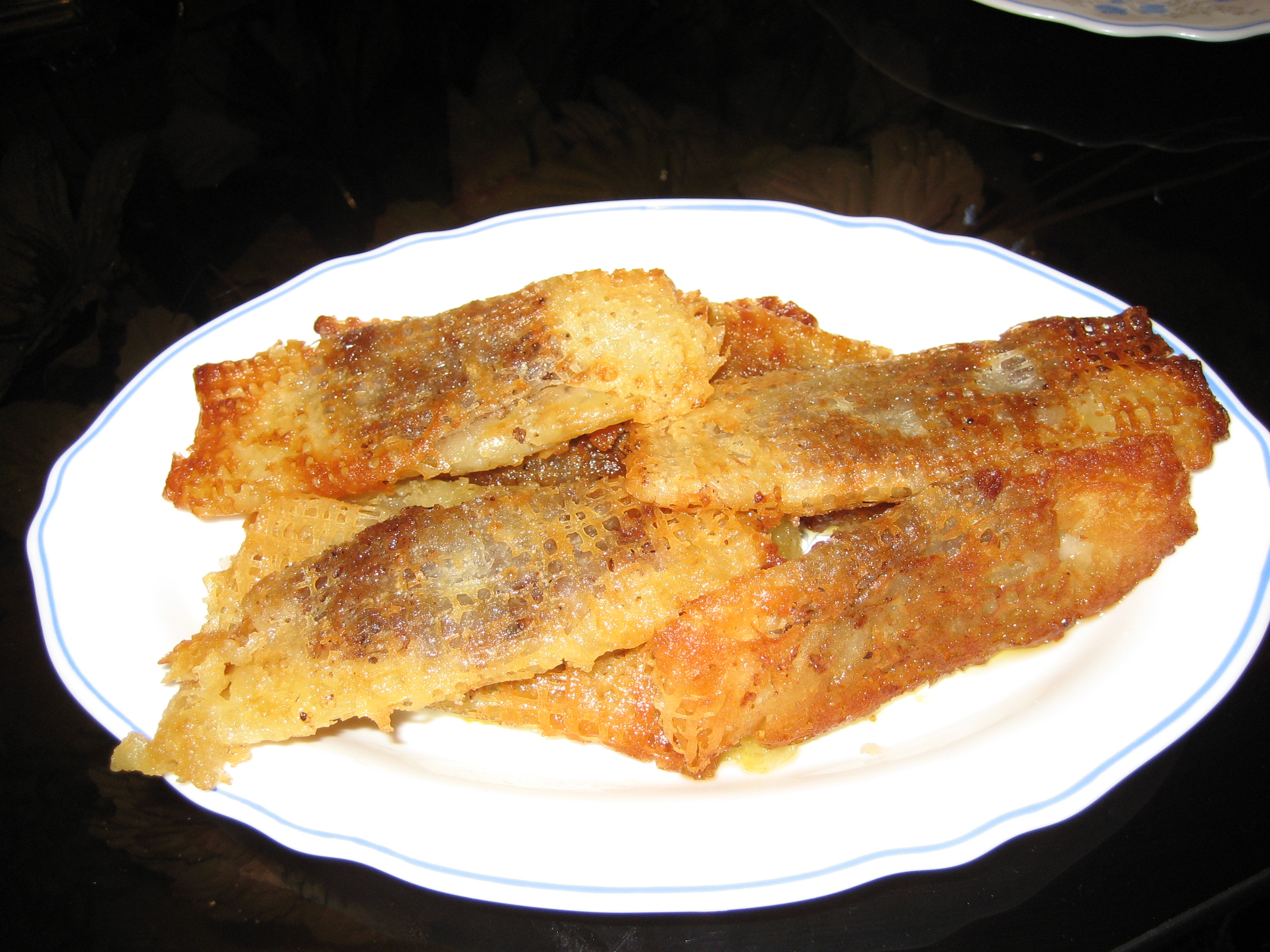
- Type: Cookie
- Place of origin: Iran
- Region or state: Gilan
- Main ingredients: Rice flour, sugar, nuts, cardamom, cinnamon, ginger, spices

Reshteh khoshkar (Persian: رشته‌خشکار) is the traditional cookie especially for Ramadan in Gilan Province, Iran. It is made of rice flour, and filled with sugar, ground walnuts or hazelnuts, cardamom, cinnamon, ginger and spice, fried in hot oil or fat. Made of rice flour, wheat flour, sugar, almonds, walnuts, and cinnamon, it is slowly fried in oil. Rice flour batter is poured in a small container with multiple holes such that the rice batter runs out of it as fountain. This container is then used to make a pattern on a hot skillet with the running rice batter. The hot skillet firms up the rice batter and makes a thin patterned sheet of rice pastry. A filling of crushed walnuts, sugar and sometimes other ingredients is placed in the center of the pastry and folded securely. This is then fried in oil and enjoyed.
