= Sohan asali =

Iranian honey and nut confection

Sohan Asali
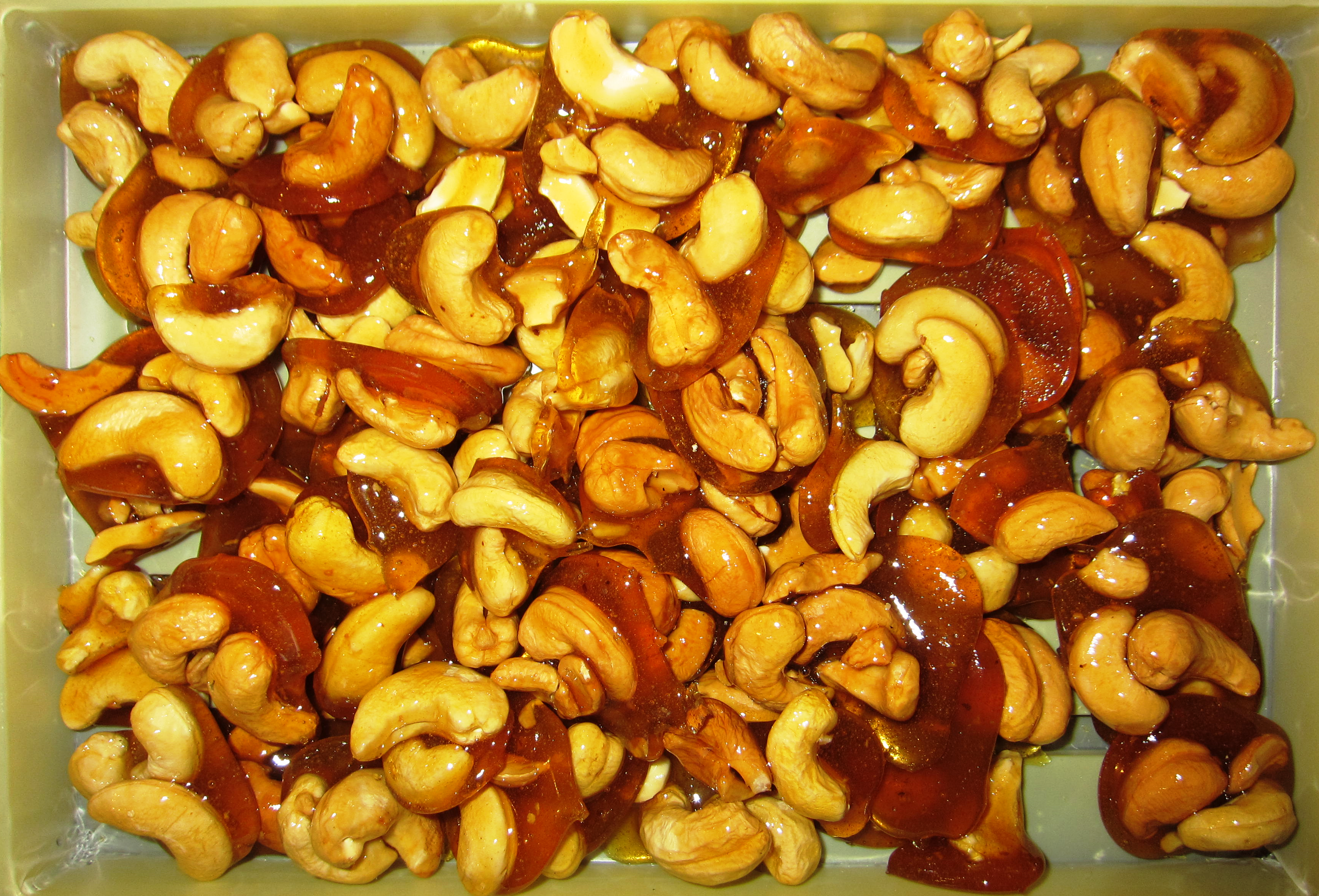
- Sohan asali with cashew, an Iranian candy made with nuts and honey
- Type: Confectionery
- Place of origin: Iran
- Region or state: Isfahan
- Main ingredients: honey; sugar; saffron; nuts; oil

Sohan asali (Persian: سوهان عسلی, romanized: sohān-e asali; from sohan, a saffron toffee, and asal, lit. 'honey') is a kind of Iranian confectionery originating in Isfahan, Iran. It is made from honey, sugar, saffron, almonds, pistachios and other nuts.

It is akin to a hard toffee, being brittle and breaking into shards. It differs from the more ubiquitous confectionery from the city of Qom (sohān-e-Qomi) as it uses no wheat and much less butter and oil. This makes it less short and able to hold its structure, whereas sohān-e-Qomi can disintegrate into powder when pressed hard.
