= Ajîl-e Moshkel-goshâ =

Ajil-e Moshkel-gosha (Persian: آجیل مشکل‌گشا), literally problem-solving nuts, is a mix of diverse dried nuts and fruits that is served during Yalda in Iran. It is popularly believed that by making a wish and eating it, a problem will be resolved.
