= Arak (drink) =

Middle Eastern distilled spirit

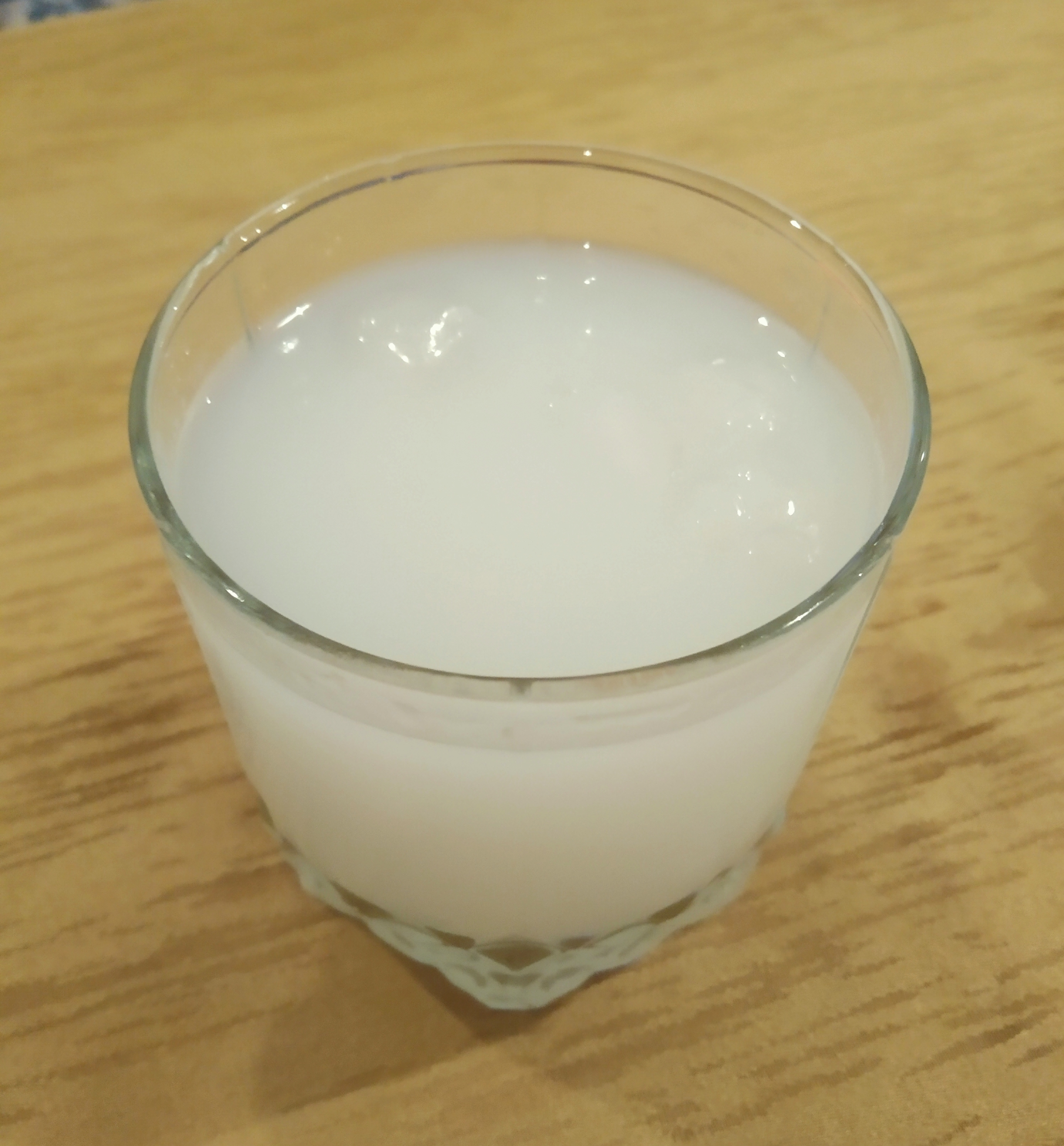
- Arak with water and ice
- Type: Spirit
- Origin: Levant
- Colour: Transparent to translucent
- Ingredients: Anise
- Related products: Rakı, absinthe, ouzo, pastis, sambuca, aragh sagi, Arkhi, soju, pernod

Arak or araq (Arabic: عرق) is a distilled Middle Eastern spirit of the anise drinks family.

== Etymology ==
The word arak comes from Arabic ʿaraq (عرق, meaning 'perspiration'). Its pronunciation varies depending on the regional varieties of Arabic, e.g.: [ˈʕæræʔ] or [ˈʕæræɡ].

Arak is the name for distilled spirits made in the Middle East from a base of grapes or pomace with anise. These are distinct from arrack, derived from same word, but referring to spirits made in southern and southeastern Asia from distilled wines of various other bases.

== Composition ==
Arak is traditionally made from grapes and anise (the seeds of the anise plant); when crushed, their oil gives arak a slight licorice taste. Dates, figs, and other fruits are sometimes added.

Typically, arak is at least 50% alcohol by volume (ABV) and can be up to 70% ABV (140 proof). 53% ABV is considered typical.

== History ==
Gregory M. Wortabet's 1856 book Syria and the Syrians contained remarks about arak:

[A]rak, a kind of spirit, also manufactured in this country, and which the natives use in visits of ceremony and on festivals; on those occasions it is handed round in small finjans or wine cups. Both are extracted from the juice of the grape. In the manufacture of arak, anise-seed is used. Considering this is a grape-growing country, the reader will be astonished to learn that little wine is comparatively made in it, and of that little, not much is used by the natives, for here let me tell the reader that the Syrians are by no means partial to liquors of any kind.

The 1936 book Arbeit und Sitte in Palaestina ("Work and Customs in Palestine") by German orientalist Gustaf Dalman described a preparation method for arak that uses grapes and anise seeds, which he learned in the Galilee region.

== Production and consumption ==
Arak is a traditional alcoholic beverage of the Levant and Eastern Mediterranean. It is distilled and consumed across a wide area in the Middle East, including in Lebanon, Syria, Jordan, Egypt, Iran, Iraq, Palestine and Israel. Sudan, Iran, Morocco, and Greece are also generally recognized as major producers and exporters of Arak.

Arak is a stronger flavored liquor and is usually mixed in proportions of approximately one part arak to two parts water in a traditional Eastern Mediterranean water vessel called an ibrik (Arabic: إبريق ibrīq), from Middle Persian or Parthian *ābrēz. The mixture is then poured into ice-filled cups, usually small, but can also be consumed in regular sized cups. This dilution turns the clear liquor a translucent milky-white color because anethole, the essential oil of anise, is soluble in alcohol but not in water. This creates an emulsion whose fine droplets scatter light and make the liquid translucent, a phenomenon known as the ouzo effect.

Arak is often served with meze, which may include dozens of small traditional dishes, as well as with grilled meat. It is also commonly served as an apéritif.

=== In Lebanon ===
Arak is often called the national drink of Lebanon. Largely made from the Marawi and Obaideh grape varieties, a center of production is the Bekaa Valley, particularly the Kefraya, Ksara, Domaine des Tourelles, and Massaya vineyards. Zahlé, where Arak Zahlawi is produced, is considered a capital of arak. The water used to produce Arak Zahlawi is traditionally drawn from the Berdawni River.

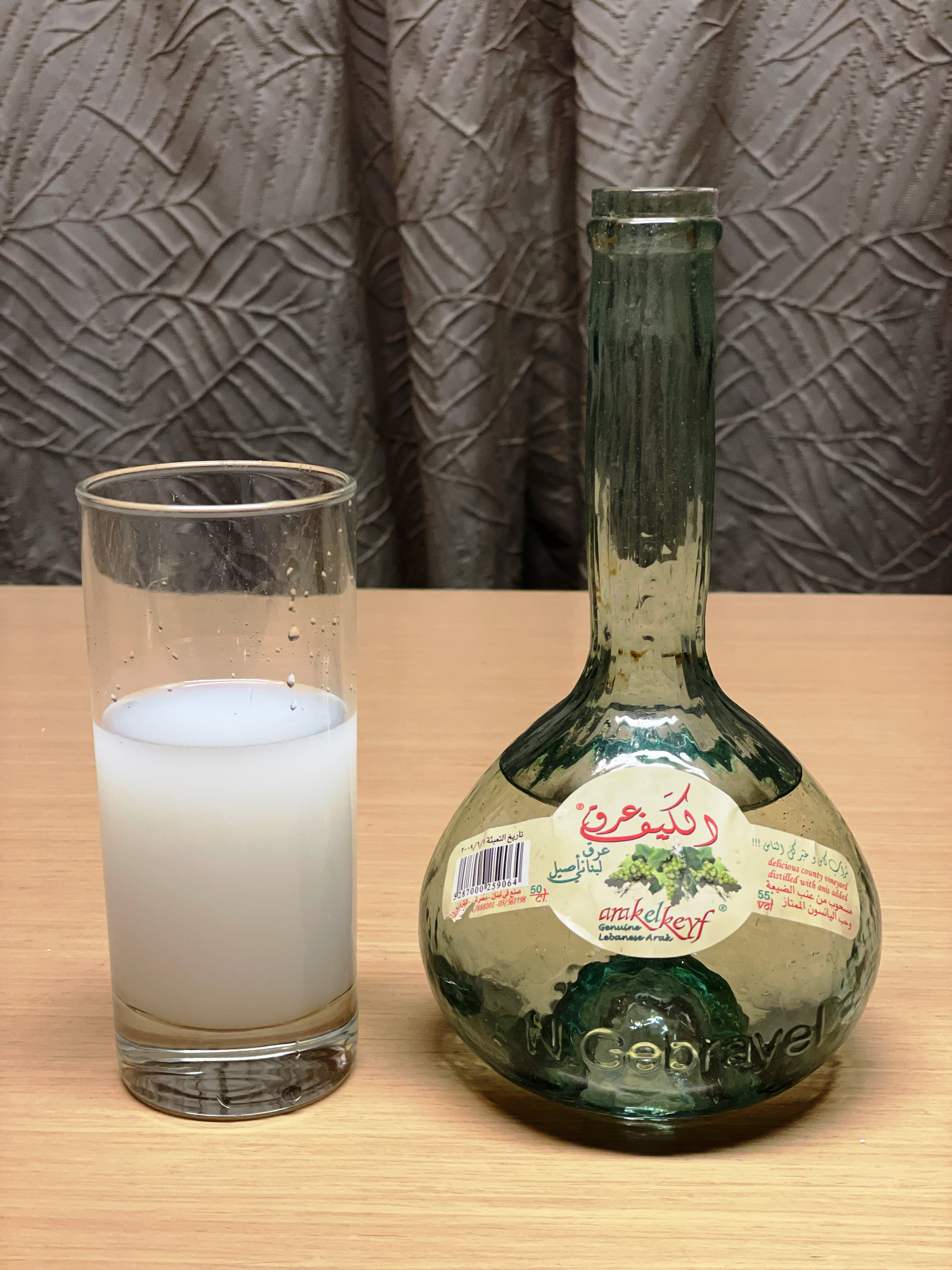
Lebanese arak

=== In Syria ===
In Syria, arak is common. Before the outbreak of the Syrian Civil War in 2011, production was dominated by two state-run firms, Al-Rayan (based in the city of Sweida) and Al-Mimas (based in a Christian settlement near Homs). Together, the two companies held about 85% of Syria's market share in arak. Since the civil war, however, the companies' profits and the price of arak have declined, and their combined market share has fallen to under half. Low-quality counterfeits also proliferated, using pure alcohol (rather than fermented grapes) and an aniseed substitute (rather than real aniseed).

=== In Iraq ===
Iraq formerly manufactured arak, including in Bashiqa in northern Iraq, but most arak production facilities shut down in the 2010s. Arak is distilled and consumed by Iraq's Yazidi and Christian minorities, although many members of these groups fled after ISIL seized control of large portions of northern Iraq in 2014. Amid a rise in Islamic conservatism, the Iraqi parliament passed a ban on the importing, manufacturing, and sale of alcoholic beverages in 2016, prompting protests from Iraqi non-Muslims and rights activists. The ban was not enforced until it was officially gazetted in 2023, triggering border crackdowns. The ban is not enforced in Iraq's autonomous Kurdistan Region.

=== In Israel ===
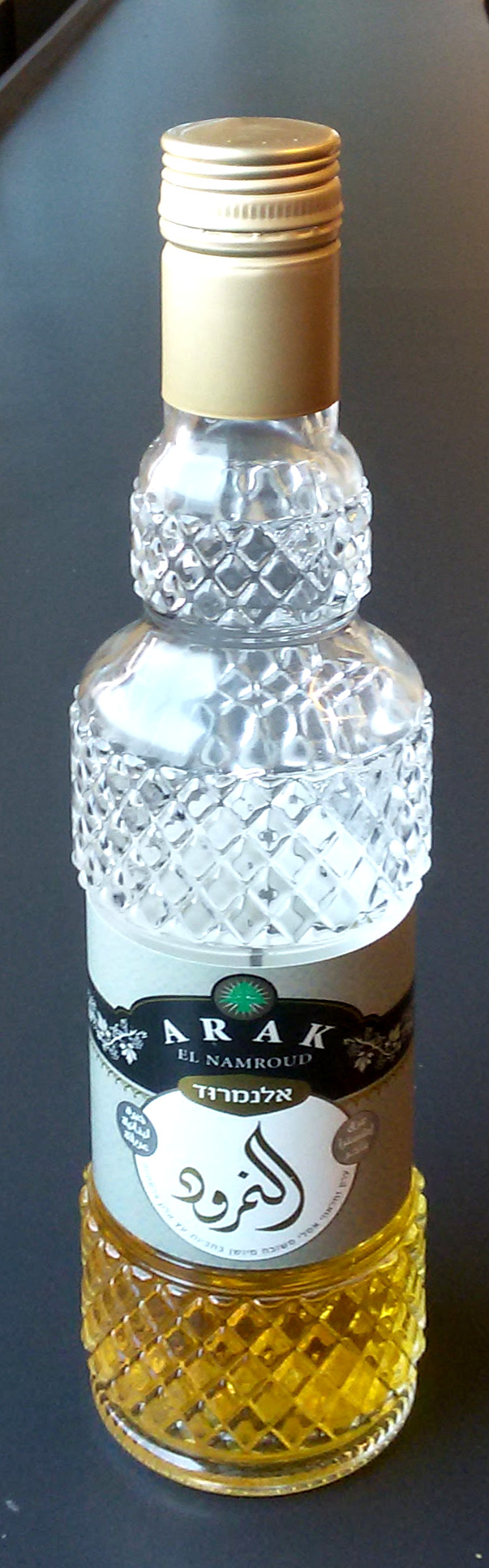
El Namroud, an aged arak distilled at Goren, a moshav in Israel.

During the age of austerity in the early years of the State of Israel, arak (in Hebrew, ערק) was locally made, with few imports. The core market for arak was older, working-class Israelis, and younger, more modern Israelis did not favor the drink. In the first two decades of the 21st century, however, arak had a resurgence in popularity. Arak also continues to be popular among Moroccan Jews in Israel, some of whom regard arak as having folk medicine properties.

Israeli tax reforms in 2013 substantially increased the alcohol tax, leading to consolidation of the arak market. The most popular producer is Joseph Gold & Sons, a winery established in 1824 in Haifa by the Gold family, which formerly made vodka in Ukraine before establishing an arak distillery in Israel. The winery, having moved later to Tirat Carmel outside Haifa, produces different arak brands, including Elite Arak, Alouf Arak, and Amir Arak. Other major arak producers include Barkan Wine Cellars (which produces Arak Ashkelon) and Kawar Distillery (which produces Arak Kawar, Arak Yuda, and Arak Noah). After the Israeli withdrawal from southern Lebanon in 2000, some former South Lebanon Army members who settled in Israel began to produce arak using Lebanese (Zahlé) methods.

=== In Palestine ===
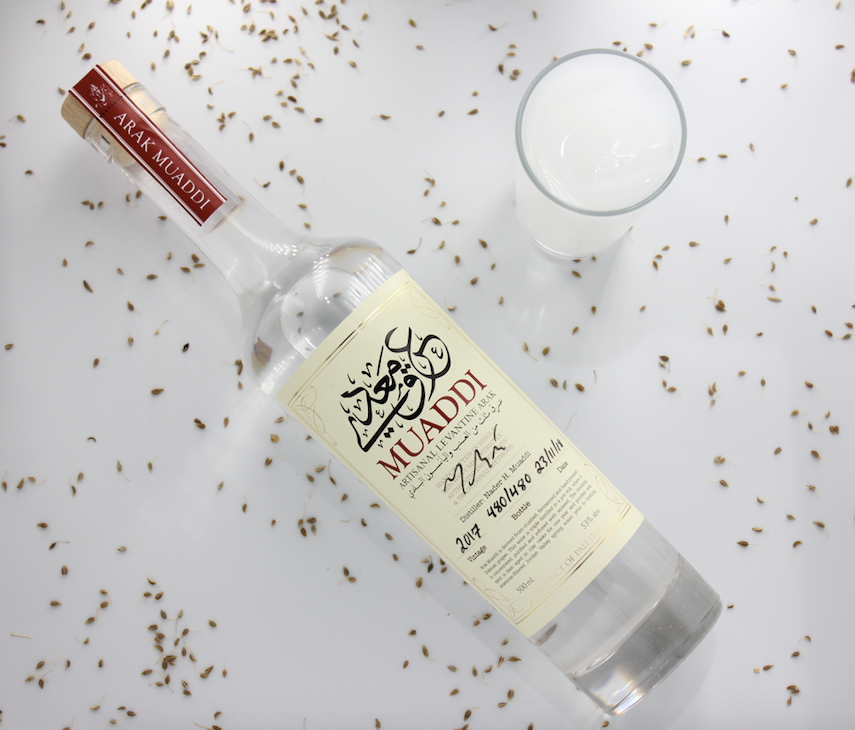
Pure arak made by Arak Muaddi in Palestine

Arak is locally produced by Palestinian Christians. The West Bank city of Ramallah is a center of arak distillation. Imports of arak from Palestine to the U.S. increased after imports of Syrian arak were disrupted by the Syrian civil war.

=== Outside the Levant ===
Several arak brands are produced outside of the Eastern Mediterranean. The Sudanese araqi is similar. Arak is also produced in North Africa. The Arak Carmel brand is produced in Spain, while the Arak Julenar brand is produced by an Iraqi in Greece.

Arak was once produced in Iran, until it was banned following the 1979 Iranian Revolution. Iranian Armenians locally manufacture black-market arak in Iran, and some foreign brands are also smuggled into the country. A locally made Iranian arak moonshine, aragh sagi, is made from fermented raisins; in 2020 it sold on the black market for about US$10 for 1.5 liters.

The Persian Empire Distillery, established in 2006 by a Shiraz-born Persian Canadian entrepreneur, distills an arak brand, Arak Saggi, at its distillery in Peterborough, Ontario.

Arak has become popular among consumers in Russia's North Caucasus region.

=== Similar drinks ===
Similar aperitifs include the Turkish rakı, the Greek ouzo and tsikoudia, the Italian sambuca and anisette, the Bulgarian and Macedonian mastika, and the Spanish anís. However, it is unrelated to the similarly named arrack, a sugarcane-based Indonesian liquor.

== Preparation ==
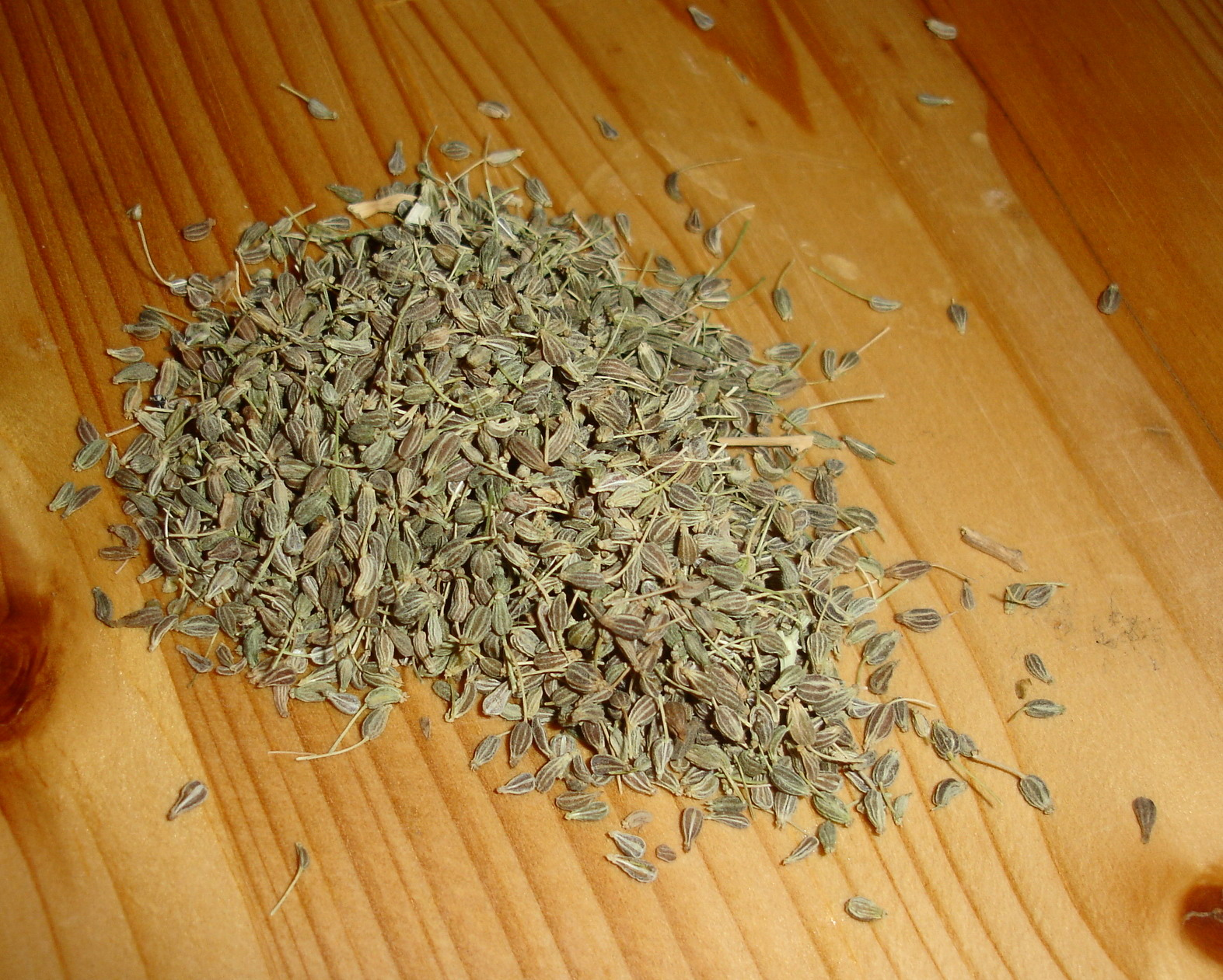
Aniseed

Manufacturing begins with the vineyards, and quality grapevines are the key to making good arak. The vines should be very mature and usually of a golden color. Instead of being irrigated, the vineyards are left to the Mediterranean climate and rely on natural rain and sun. The grapes, harvested in late September and early October, are crushed, and the juice is put in barrels (in Arabic el romeli), then left to ferment for three weeks. Occasionally, the whole mix is stirred to release the CO_{2}.

Both pot stills and column stills are used. Stills are usually made of stainless steel or copper. Copper stills with a Moorish shape are the most sought after.

The alcohol collected in the first distillation undergoes a second distillation, but this time it is mixed with aniseed. The ratio of alcohol to aniseed may vary, and it is a major factor in the final product's quality. The finished product is produced during a final distillation at the lowest possible temperature. For a quality arak, the finished spirit is then aged in clay amphoras to allow the angels' share to evaporate. The liquid remaining after this step is the most suitable for consumption.

== See also ==
- Boukha (Tunisian drink)
- Mahia (Moroccan drink)
- Soju (Korean drink)
- Zivania (Cypriot drink)
