= Rute =

- Municipality
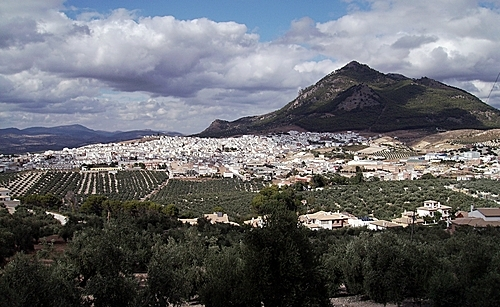
- View of Rute

- Flag Coat of arms

- Location in Spain
- Coordinates: 37°19′31″N 4°22′13″W
- Country: Spain
- Autonomous Community: Andalusia
- Province: Córdoba
- Comarca: Comarca Subbética

Government
  - Mayor: David Ruiz Cobos (PP)

Area
  - Total: 132.4 km^{2} (51.1 sq mi)
- Elevation (AMSL): 635 m (2,083 ft)

Population (2025-01-01)
  - Total: 9,824
  - Density: 74.20/km^{2} (192.2/sq mi)
- Time zone: UTC+1 (CET)
  - Summer (DST): UTC+2 (CEST (GMT +2))
- Postal code: 14960
- Area code: +34 (Spain) + 957 (Córdoba)
- Website: www.rute.es

Rute is a municipality in the province of Córdoba, Spain. It lies between Iznájar to the South East, and Lucena to the North West. Its primary economy centres on the extensive production of foodstuffs including dozens of different makes of anise and traditional Spanish hams. Galleros and Flor de Rute both have their factories there; Galleros being famous for its annual "Belen" - the Nativity Scene made from Chocolate, on view from around 15 October each year, and Flor de Rute for their sugarwork which in 2007 included a sugar life-sized scene of Picasso amongst other characters.

The name Rute is of uncertain origin, but has a likely Semitic root. Later, the first "anis" factory was opened. Because of this, more factories were opened and this municipality became one of the most important makers of anis for over the world. Today, most of these factories are still open and many people go to Rute at Christmas for the sweets that are made there. There are many festivities too. There is Our Lady of Cabeza (Virgen de la Cabeza) which is a procession that leaves a little church and for a day traverses its village in May (usually on the second weekend of the month). There is also another procession that is Virgin of Carmel (Virgen del Carmen) that traverses Rute on the fifteenth of August. Carnivale is celebrated here too, and it has many influence in February, because many people from others villages go to Rute to celebrate there. Easter is celebrated too and there are many brotherhoods which carry their processions out.

The olive industry is also key to this area of Spain, along with tourism connected to the aforementioned sites.

== See also ==
- List of municipalities in Córdoba
