= El Namroud =

Lebanese-Israeli brand of arak

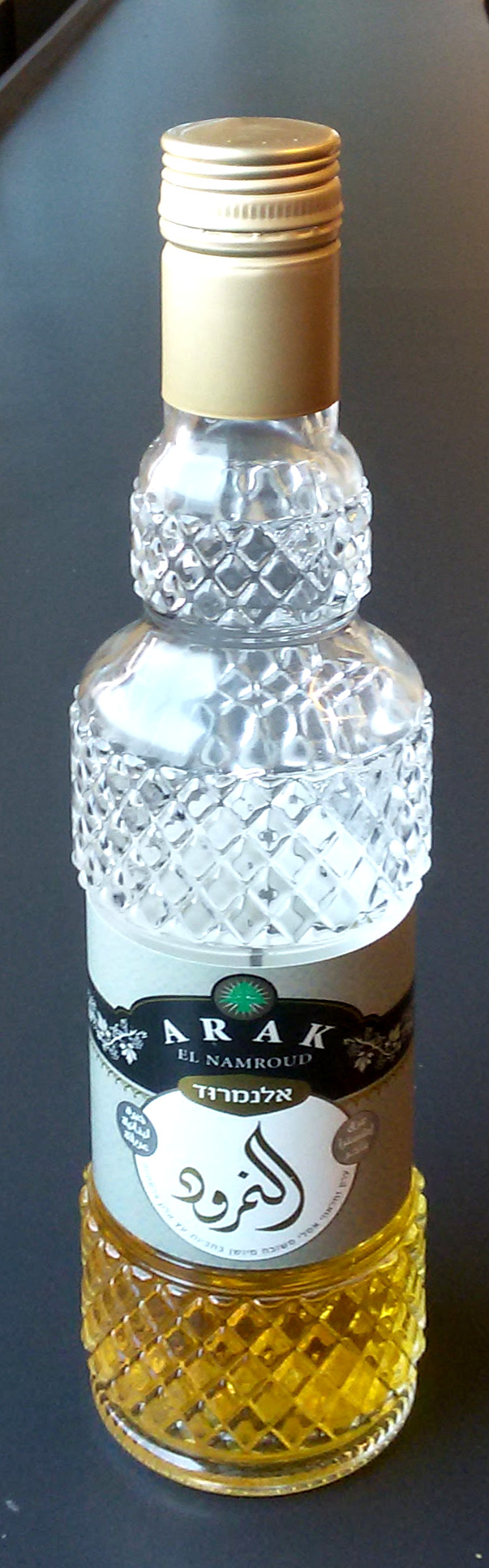
- Aged El Namroud arak
- Type: Arak
- Manufacturer: El Namroud distillery
- Distributor: IBBL Spirit Limited, a subsidiary of Coca-Cola
- Origin: Israel
- Alcohol by volume: 50%
- Colour: Clear, Yellow
- Flavour: Anise

El Namroud is a Lebanese-Israeli brand of arak, manufactured in the eponymous distillery in the Goren Industrial Area, Ma'ale Yosef Regional Council, in the Upper Galilee. The distillery was founded by Elias Karam, one of the South Lebanon Army militiamen who fled to Israel after the year 2000 withdrawal from southern Lebanon, with aid from General Antoine Lahad, a relative of Karam.

For religious kashrut purposes, the actual work in all steps of preparing the arak is done by Jews, with the Lebanese experts contributing the knowledge and supervising the work.

== Varieties ==
The distillery produces two varieties of arak: the clear Arak El Namroud and the golden-colored Aged Arak El Namroud, matured in oak wine barrels for six months.
