= Shiraz wine =

Alcoholic beverage historically produced in Iran

- Type: wine
- Colour: red

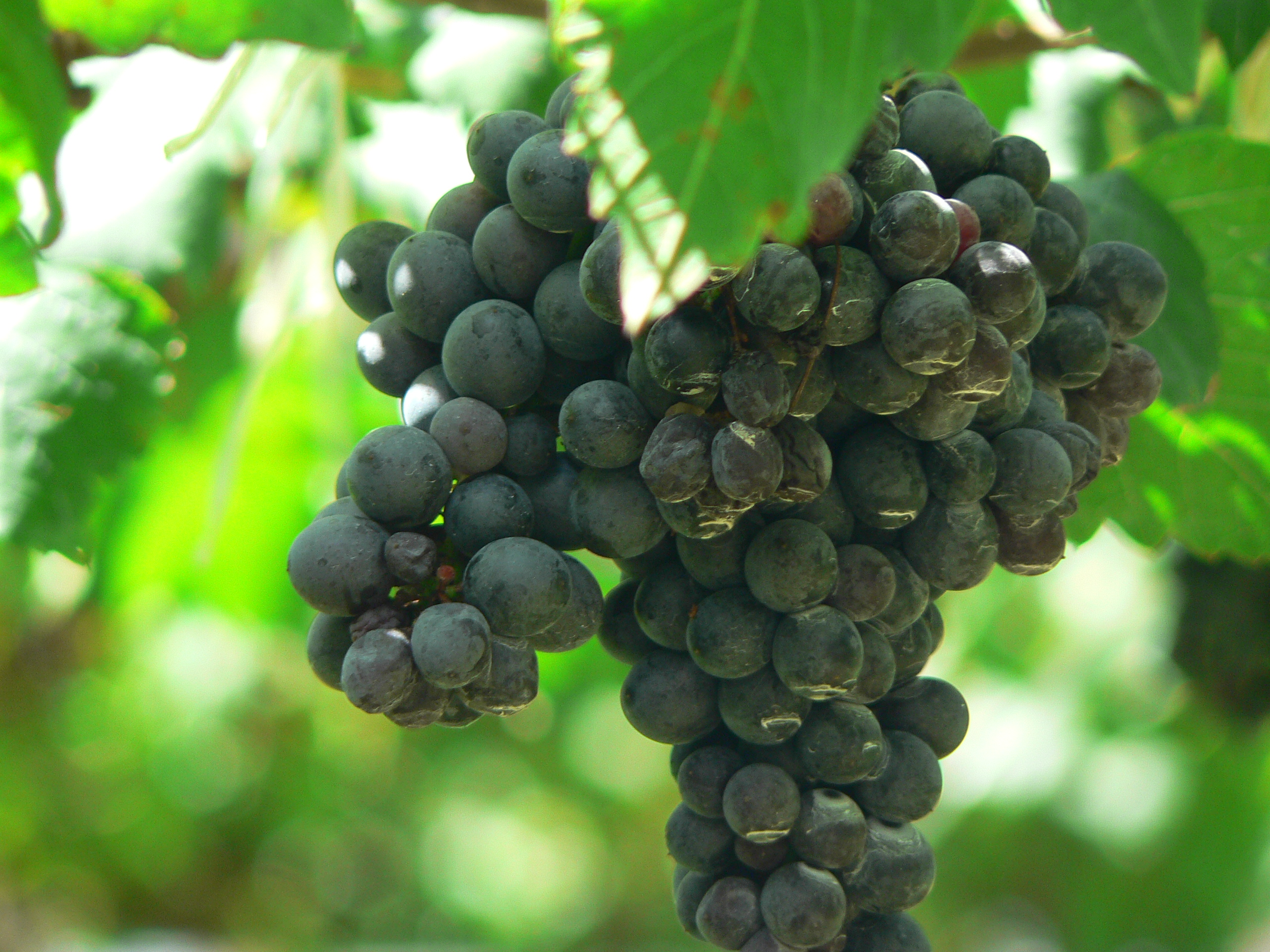
Shiraz (Syrah) grapes

Shiraz wine (Persian: شراب شیراز) refers to two different wines. Historically, Shiraz wine refers to the wine produced around the city of Shiraz in Iran. In the current era, "Shiraz" is an alternative name for the Syrah grape, mostly used in Australia and South Africa. The modern "Shiraz" grape is identical to Syrah and originated in southeast France with no established connection to the city of Shiraz.

== History ==
By the 9th century CE, the city of Shiraz had established a reputation for producing the finest wine in the world, and was Iran's wine capital. The export of Shiraz wine by European merchants in the 17th century has been documented. As described by enthusiastic English and French travellers to the region in the 17th to 19th centuries, the wine grown close to the city was of a more dilute character due to irrigation, while the best Shiraz wines were actually grown in terraced vineyards around the village of Khollar. These wines were white and existed in two different styles: dry wines for drinking young, and sweet wines meant for aging. The latter wines were compared to "an old sherry" (one of the most prized European wines of the day), and at five years of age were said to have a fine bouquet and nutty flavour. The dry white Shiraz wines (but not the sweet ones) were fermented with significant stem contact, which should have made these wines rich in tannins.

While travellers have described the wines as white, there seem to be no ampelographic descriptions of the vines or grapes. Marco Polo made mention of the wine, and other classical accounts describe vines trained by pulleys and weights to grow up one side of a house and down another.

The British poet Edward FitzGerald later translated the Rubaiyat of Omar Khayyam from Persian language, in which praise is heaped on the Shiraz wines.

=== Modern era ===
In modern Iran, Shiraz wine cannot be produced legally due to the prohibition of alcohol in Islam. Before the Islamic Revolution in 1979, there were up to 300 wineries in Iran; now there are none. As a whole, Iran is no longer a wine-producing country, although Iranian Christians are legally allowed to ferment wine.

Despite the name, there is no proven connection between the city of Shiraz and the modern-day red grape variety "Shiraz", planted in Australia, South Africa, Argentina, Canada, the United States, and some other countries. The modern Shiraz grape, now known to be identical to the Syrah grape, was brought to Australia by James Busby, the father of Australian wine. Busby travelled through Spain and France collecting vine cuttings that were the foundation of the Australian wine industry.

== See also ==
- Persian wine
- Australian wine
- South African wine
