= Persian wine =

Wine making in Iran

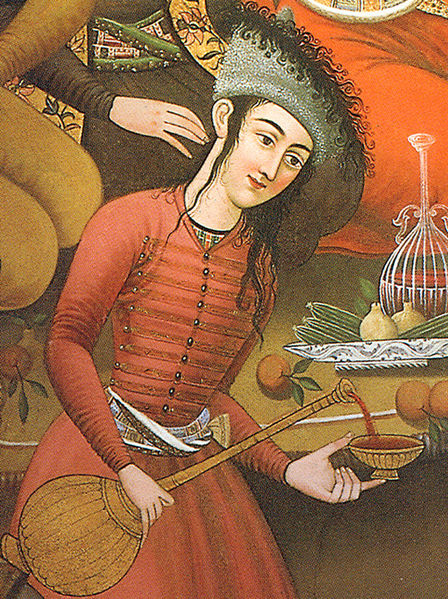
A wine-pourer or saghi, Safavid court painting, 17th century Isfahan.

Persian wine, also called May (Persian: می), Mul (Persian: مل), and Bâdah (باده), is a cultural symbol and tradition in Iran, and has a significant presence in Iranian mythology, Persian poetry and Persian miniatures.

== History ==
Recent archaeological research has pushed back the date of the known origin of wine making in Persia far beyond that which writers earlier in the 20th century had envisaged. Excavations at the Godin Tepe site in the Zagros Mountains (Badler, 1995; McGovern and Michel, 1995; McGovern, 2003), have revealed pottery vessels dating from c. 3100–2900 BC containing tartaric acid, almost certainly indicating the former presence of wine. Even earlier evidence was found at the site of Hajji Firuz Tepe, also in the Zagros Mountains. Here, McGovern et al. (1996) used chemical analyses of the residue of a Neolithic jar dating from as early as 5400–5000 BC to indicate high levels of tartaric acid, again suggesting that the fluid contained therein had been made from grapes.

=== Pre-Islamic period ===
The modern historian Rudi Matthee explains that in Zoroastrianism wine was a symbol for liquid gold as well as the moving fire of the radiant sun. Therefore, wine held a ritual function in Zoroastrianism, being part of a liberation ritual, in which it substituted for blood. Matthee adds that the history of the Iranian elite of ancient and late antique Iran "could be written as the history of razm va bazm (fighting and feasting), with wine at the centre".

=== Islamic period ===
Wine drinking was prominent in Classical Islam, from Al-Andalus in the west to Khorasan in the east. The Iranian Saffarid and Samanid rulers, the first to look for autonomy from their Abbasid suzerains, were known, as Matthee explains, "for the gusto with which they and their entourage indulged in wine-drinking." The 11th-century Qabus-nama, written by Keikavus of the Ziyarid dynasty, explicitly records that the Quran prohibits wine consumption, yet also states advice (same goes for Nizam al-Mulk's Siyasatnama) on what the proper fashion is for drinking wine while also taking it for granted that wine will be served at feasts.

The English traveller and writer Thomas Herbert wrote in 1627 about the difference between wine consumption of the Ottomans and Iranians. According to Herbert, the Ottomans, who, although were prohibited to drink wine by law, still drank it covertly. The Iranians on the other hand, Herbert asserted, since a long period of time, drunk wine openly and with excess. According to the French traveller Jean Chardin, who was in 17th-century Safavid Iran, drinking was mainly done in order to get drunk fast hence the appreciation of Iranians for strong wines.

Alcoholic drinks were commonly drunk amongst the elite, and Muslims often visited the taverns; however, alcohol was "formally outlawed", hence it could not operate in the reality of everyday life. Thus, in turn, as Matthee explains, the drinking of wine "became a metaphor for the ardent feelings of the lover for the beloved in the imaginary world of (mystical) poetry".

In modern Iran, wine cannot be produced legally due to the prohibition of alcohol. Before the Islamic Revolution in 1979, there were up to 300 wineries in Iran; now there are none. As a whole, Iran is no longer a wine-producing country, but Iranian Christians are legally allowed to ferment wine.

=== Legends and myths ===
According to Iranian legend, wine was discovered by a girl despondent over her rejection by the king. The girl decided to commit suicide by drinking the spoiled residue left by rotting table grapes. Instead of poisoning the girl, the fermented must caused her to pass out to awaken the next morning with the realization that life was worth living. She reported back to the king her discovery of the intoxicating qualities of the spoiled grape juice and was rewarded for her find.

=== Historical Foundations ===
Archaeological findings have been collected in different ways including wine-making equipment or buildings and structures, pottery residues analysis, faunal remains, rock-cut dwellings including artefacts and artistic scenes of feasting and celebrations, drinking vessels, goblets, and cups, and elite burials. Some notable sites with these findings are listed here:

- Zagros Mountains Rock Arts
- Ganj Dareh (c. 10000–9500 BCE)
- Chogha Mish (c. 6800–3000 BCE)
- Jameh Shuran (c. 6000–4500 BCE)
- Tepe Sialk (c. 6000–5500 BCE)
- Meymand III (c. 6th millennium BCE)
- Dinkha Tepe (c. 8000–2000 BCE)
- Hajji Firuz Tepe (c. 5400 BCE)
- Sialk (c. 5500–4500 BCE)
- Huto and Hissar II (c. 5000–4500 BCE)
- Tepe Hissar (c. 5500–2500 BCE)
- Cheshmeh Ali (c. 4th millennium BCE)
- Bardsir (c. 4000–3500 BCE)
- Tepe Hissar IV (c. 4000–3500 BCE)
- Sarab (c. 4200–3800 BCE)
- Khurab (c. 4000–3000 BCE)
- Nush-i Jan (c. 4000–3000 BCE)
- Sar Mashhad (c. 3500–3000 BCE)
- Siah Tappeh (c. 3500–3000 BCE)
- Chogha Golan (c. 3400–3100 BCE)
- Tall-e Bakun A (c. 3400–3100 BCE)
- Hesar Tepe (c. 3500–2800 BCE)
- Tureng Tepe (c. 3400–2000 BCE)
- Godin Tepe (c. 3200 BCE)
- Tureng Tepe II (c. 3200–2800 BCE)
- Konar Sandal (c. 3200–2600 BCE)
- Shahr-i Sokhta (c. 2800–2000 BCE)
- Dahan-e Gholaman (c. 2800–2300 BCE)
- Marlik (c. 2800–2300 BCE)
- Tall-i Bakun (c. 2500 BCE)
- Qaleh Rostam (c. 2700–2000 BCE)
- Shahr-e Sukhteh or Sookhteh (c. 3200–1800 BCE)
- Tepe Yahya (c. 2200–1800 BCE)
- Khurvin (c. 2000–1600 BCE)
- Zagheh (c. 1500–1200 BCE)
- Kamarband Caves (c. 1500–1200 BCE)
- Gandhara (c. 6th century BCE–5th century CE)
- Shahr-e Sukhteh (c. 3200–1800 BCE)
- Gohar Tepe (c. 2000 BCE–1st millennium BCE)
- Khosrowabad (c. 1200–1000 BCE)
- Gohar Tepe (c. 3rd century CE)
- Bishapur (c. 3rd century CE)
- Sassanian Empire (224–651 CE): archeologic evidence in Persepolis, Pasargadae, and Susa (Shush).
- Islamic Period (7th century onwards): excavations have revealed many underground production sites as well as notable sites such as in Siraf, an ancient port.
- Seljuk and Mongol Periods (11th–13th centuries): structures and artifacts discovered in multiple sites including in Ray, located near modern-day Tehran. Shiraz, a center of Persian poetry, literature, and art was also known for its wine production, and some of the famous poets, such as Hafez and Saadi, praised the quality and taste of Shiraz wine in their verses. Discovered or existing inscriptions or decorations related to wine are abundant in a variety of artefacts and structures.
- Safavid Dynasty (1501–1736): despite prohibitions, strong historical evidence of scattered production and consumption in the cities such as Isfahan, Ghazvin, Tabriz, and Choghazanbi exist such as the famous Shah Abas with wine painting.
- Qajar Dynasty (1794–1925): elite class, as well as the existence of taverns and distilleries in some cities. principal manufacturing centers of the period were Isfahan, Yazd, Shiraz, Kāšān, Hamadān, and Rašt, and that some of them produced wine and other alcoholic beverages, such as araq (a distilled spirit) and būza (a fermented drink made from barley or millet).
- Pahlavi

== Depiction in Persian miniatures ==
Miniature painting in Persia developed into a sophisticated art in which the most important element that all these paintings share is their subjects. The subjects that are mainly chosen from Hafez’s “Ghazaliyat” or Khayyam’s Rubaiyat. Therefore, the Persian wine, Mey, and Persian wine server (or cup bearer), Saghi, are essential parts to a majority of these paintings. Usually, the old man in the painting is Hafez or Khayyam, who, having left his scholarly position and books behind, is now drunk in Kharabat (a mystical rundown tavern located in a remote and poor corner of town) or in Golshan (garden) drinking wine from the hands of gorgeous Saghis.

In Persian poetry, grapes and wine appear frequently with symbolic, metaphorical, and actual meanings.

== See also ==
- Alcohol in Iran
- Persian culture
- Shirazi wine
- Beer in Iran

== Sources ==
- Matthee, Rudi (2014). "Alcohol in the Islamic Middle East: Ambivalence and Ambiguity". Past & Present (suppl_9): 100–125. doi:10.1093/pastj/gtt031.
- Spuler, Bertold (2015). Hoyland, Robert G.; Goldbloom, Gwendolin; Walburg, Berenike (eds.). Iran in the Early Islamic Period: Politics, Culture, Administration and Public Life between the Arab and the Seljuk Conquests, 633-1055. Brill. ISBN 978-90-04-27751-9.
