= Massaya =

Lebanese distillery

Massaya is a Lebanese winery and arak distillery owned and operated by the Ghosn brothers Sami and Ramzi. Situated in the north of the Beqaa Valley near Chtaura and Zahlé, 38 km from Baalbek, the winery and distillery are located on the Tanaïl property, which is also home to vineyards and a restaurant. The Beqaa Valley has an extensive history of viticulture dating back over 5,000 years to the Phoenicians. The northern Bekaa has traditionally been a favoured terroir for viticulture, especially since the beginning of the last century. Vines have also been introduced in the southern Bekaa as part of the recent surge in the number of wineries established in Lebanon.

== The history of the estate ==
The Tanaïl property was brought by Michel and Amal Ghosn in the early 1970s and was used by the family as a country retreat from their primary residence in Beirut. In line with tradition, it was planted table grapes, including indigenous varieties such as beitamouni and obeidi, used to produce home-made arak. It also had a kitchen garden growing mekti, an indigenous drought-resistant cucumber, and orchards.

The outbreak of the Lebanese Civil War in 1975 forced the family to leave the estate and both Sami and Ramzi Ghosn left Lebanon to study abroad. In the early 1990s Sami and Ramzi returned to Lebanon and decided to work on revitalisating the war-ravaged estate.

== Establishment ==
At the end of the civil war in 1991 there were five wineries in Lebanon – Château Musar, Château Ksara, Kefraya, Domaine des Tourelles and Nakad but that number has now increased to over 30. As part of this renaissance, the Ghosn brothers, assisted by French partners, established the Massaya winery in 1998, citing the historical potential of Lebanese terroir and a desire to revitalise both a traditional industry and an area that had suffered hugely during the civil war.

Initially the brothers focused on the revival of traditional home-made arak, the Lebanese spirit made from wine and aniseed, often likened to Turkey's raki and Greece's ouzo. Only traditional methods were used, including the burning of vine wood to heat the copper alembics used for distillation and the use of traditional clay jars for ageing the arak. The clay jars are produced for Massaya by specialised potters from the village of Beit Chabab. The arak is triple distilled and aged for 18 months. It is drunk diluted with water or ice. Massaya now produces 40,000 litres per annum which is sold in distinctive blue bottles and has had notable success

== French partners ==
The Brunier family of Châteauneuf-du-Pape and the Hebrard family, formerly of Château Cheval Blanc in Saint-Émilion, Bordeaux, are partners in the winery. Hippolyte Brunier planted his first wine stocks on Plateau de la Crau, where grapes had been grown since the 14th century and where, in 1972, Claude Chappe, the inventor of the optical telegraph, built one of his signal towers. Hippolyte’s son, Jules, extended the estate to 42 acres and gave it its name "Vieux Télégraphe". Since the early 1980s, the family business has been run by Frédéric and Daniel, both of whom are partners in Massaya. After the sale of the Hebrard family enterprise, Dominic Hebrard established la Maison Hebrard, a new Chateau in Saint Emilion, and went into partnership with Massaya.

== Wines ==
The grapes are harvested in September and October from Massaya's vineyards on the Tanaïl property as well as other areas of Massaya land around the Bekaa valley. Massaya bottles five wines per vintage: one white, one rosé and three reds – Classic, Silver Selection and Gold Reserve, made from varying blends of Grenache noir, Cabernet Sauvignon, Mourvedre, Syrah and Cinsault. Both the Gold Reserve and Silver Selection are aged in oak before release.

The wines have won several awards. The winery produces 300,000 bottles per annum, 80% of which are exported. Its restaurant and tasting facilities are frequented by resident Lebanese and tourists alike.
