= Alcohol in Iran =

Alcohol has been illegal for Muslim Iranian citizens since the formation of the modern Iranian state in 1925 under the semi-secular Imperial State, and has been upheld by the current Islamic Republic government after taking power in 1979.

In 2011, 5.7% of the adult population self-reported consuming alcohol in the previous year.

== History ==
Wine has played an important role in Persian culture and history ranging from administration of the earliest empires to religion and Persian literature.

=== Pre-Islamic period ===
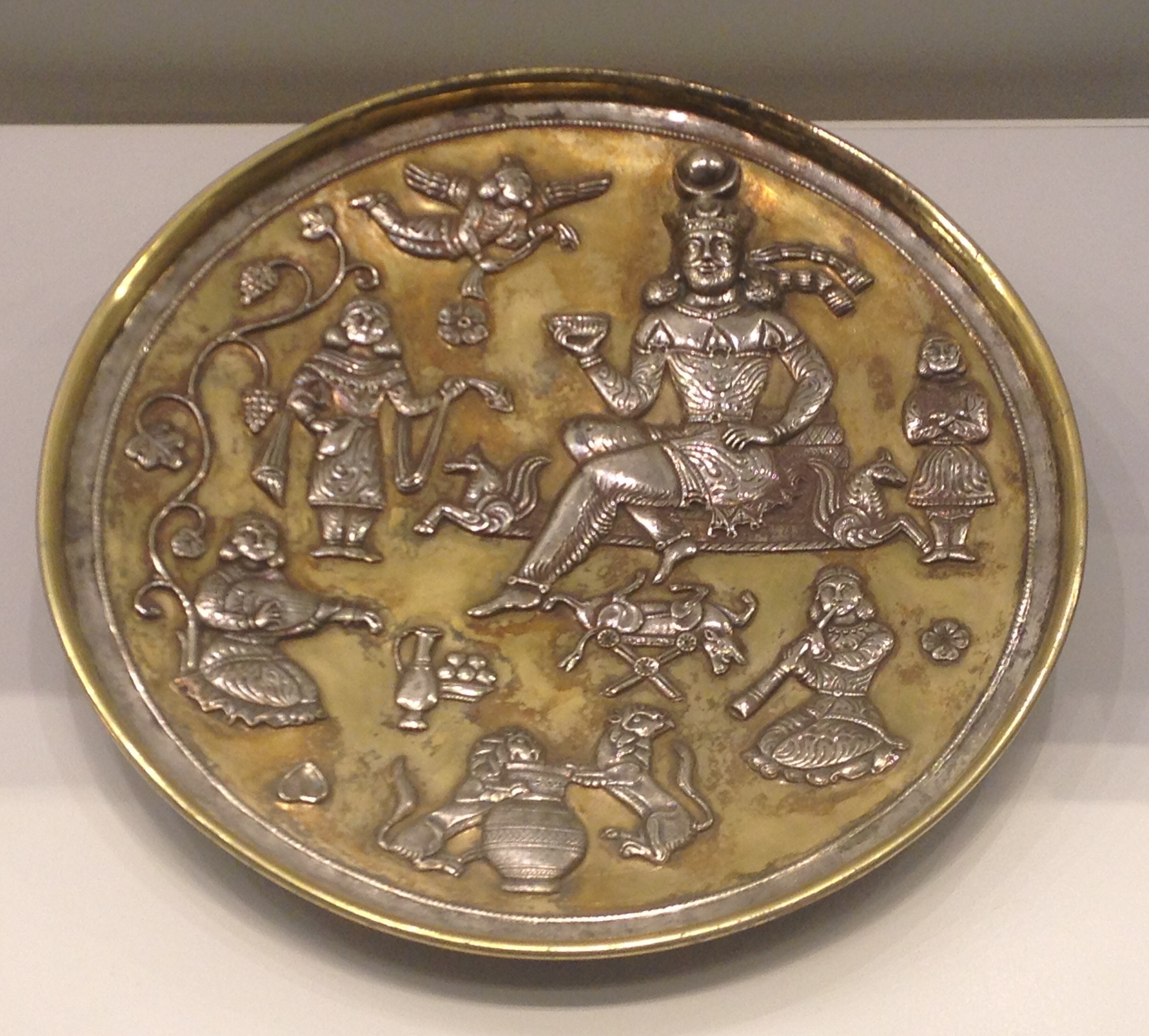
7th–8th century plate depicting a drinking party in Sasanian style, Rabenou Gallery of Islamic Art

The modern historian Rudi Matthee explains that in Zoroastrianism wine was a symbol of liquid gold as well as the moving fire of the radiant sun. Therefore, wine held a ritual function in Zoroastrianism, being part of a liberation ritual, in which it substituted for blood. Matthee adds that the history of the Iranian elite of ancient and late antique Iran "could be written as the history of razm va bazm (fighting and feasting), with wine at the center".

The word booze in English (and small variations in several other European languages) has probably its origin in medieval Persian the same meaning and almost similar pronunciation (Persian: بوزه)[buzeh])

=== Islamic period ===
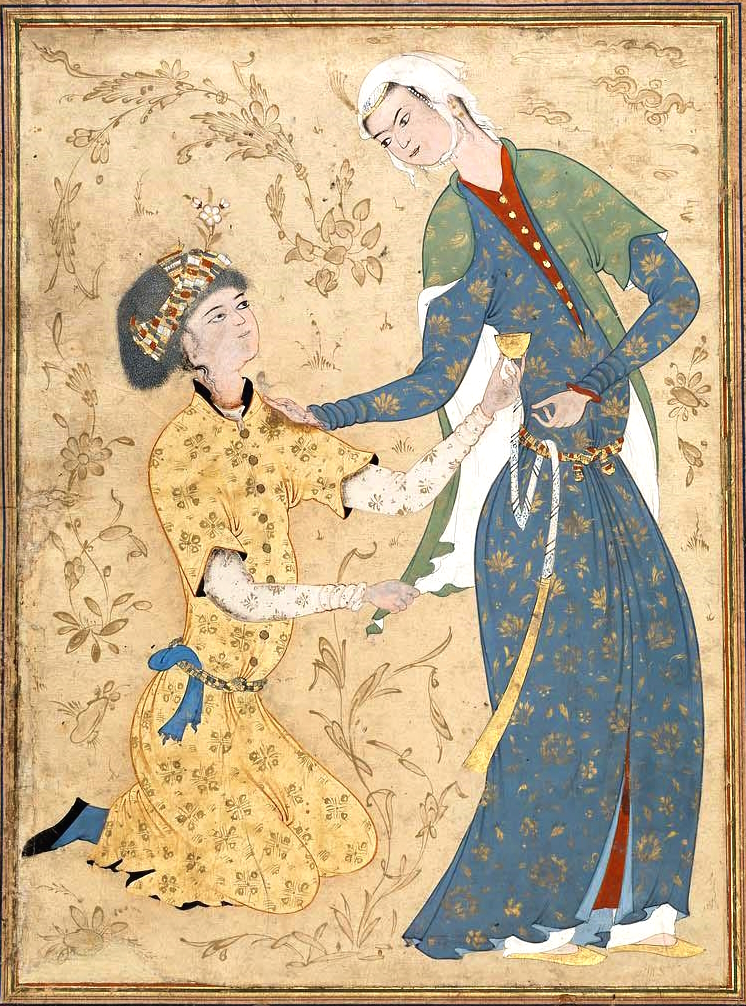
A young man offering a cup of wine to a girl. Safavid period, 16th century

Wine drinking was prominent in Classical Islam, from Al-Andalus in the west to Khorasan in the east. The Iranian Saffarid and Samanid rulers, the first to look for autonomy from their Abbasid suzerains, were known, as Matthee explains, "for the gusto with which they and their entourage indulged in wine-drinking." The 11th-century Qabus-nama, written by Keikavus of the Ziyarid dynasty, explicitly records that the Quran prohibits wine consumption, yet also states advice (same goes for Nizam al-Mulk's Siyasatnama) on what the proper fashion is for drinking wine while also taking it for granted that wine will be served at feasts.

The English traveller and writer Thomas Herbert wrote in 1627 about the difference between wine consumption of the Ottomans and Iranians. According to Herbert, the Ottomans, who, although they were prohibited to drink wine by law, still drank it covertly. The Iranians on the other hand, Herbert asserted, had long consumed wine openly and to excess. According to the French traveller Jean Chardin, who was in 17th-century Safavid Iran, drinking was mainly done in order to get drunk fast hence the appreciation of Iranians for strong wines. Echoing Reinhold Lubenau's writings on late 16th-century Ottoman Constantinople (modern-day Istanbul), Chardin reported that "Iranians would recoil while drinking, treating alcohol like a medicine to be swallowed rather than enjoyed".

Matthee explains that the goal of getting drunk quickly stemmed from the fact that alcohol in Islamic culture was "not synonymous with sociability". As alcohol is considered a forbidden substance in Islam, alcohol could never become fully integrated into the idea of a proper life. Unlike the ancient Greek symposium tradition, where alcohol was considered a substance to brighten up the ambiance, it was firmly entrenched as part of the lifestyle of the elite. Nevertheless, even there, alcohol remained a "forbidden fruit, and thus could not escape furtive embrace amid public disavowal". In the Islamic world, the drinking of alcohol never became part of the overall food and drinking culture, in the way of "enhancing the convivial atmosphere of the meal, the way it did in Mediterranean and Christian/European culture". Meals in the Islamic world were usually eaten in silence with a glass of water. After that, the host and the guests would engage in discussion with coffee and tea with the water pipe, and usually in a different room.

According to Matthee, social class was also important in the assessment of alcohol consumption. People who drank alcohol were usually from higher social ranks, the elite (khass), whereas abstemiousness was most prevalent among the middling classes, who were simultaneously known for their piousness. The upper classes drank as they believed they were entitled to, that is, enjoying alcohol as a 'right', a privilege traditionally bestowed upon the elite in Islamic lands. Abstention from alcohol belonged to the commoners, the avvam, who were unable to restrain themselves. The lowest social classes usually used other drugs, most prominently opium (which is not condemned in particular by the Quran or the hadiths). They generally used it, as Matthee explains, to while away boredom, to gain stupefaction from their troublesome lifes, and especially as a form of self-medication.

Common people who drank in those times were associated with subcultures of subterfuge and furtiveness, Matthee explains. These people would usually sneak off to taverns in back-alleys of the predominantly non-Muslim inhabited parts of cities and towns, which were run by Jews and Armenians. Taverns in Islamic societies were widely regarded as immoral venues tied to disreputable aspects of social life, with the tavern keeper occupying "roughly the same place on the social scale as the prostitute, the overt homosexual, and the itinerant entertainer." However, others such as the Kurds and Lurs were reported to have enjoyed alcohol with indifference to religion.

Alcoholic drinks were commonly consumed amongst the elite, and Muslims often visited the taverns; however, alcohol was "formally outlawed", hence it could not operate in the reality of everyday life. Thus, in turn, as Matthee explains, the drinking of wine "became a metaphor for the ardent feelings of the lover for the beloved in the imaginary world of (mystical) poetry".

== Modern-day Iranian laws ==
During the reign of the semi-secular monarchy of Mohammed Reza Pahlavi, alcohol was legal and was sold in bars and pubs to adults over the age of 18. The policy of alcohol ban for its Muslim population is preserved after the Iranian Revolution in 1979 while smuggling alcohol into the country is illegal.

=== Allowances for non-Muslims ===
Officially recognized non-Muslim minorities are allowed to produce alcoholic beverages for their own consumption and for religious rites such as the Eucharist. Two of the four religious minorities guaranteed representation in the parliament (Majlis) – Armenians and Assyrians – are Christian, the former being chiefly Armenian Apostolic.

=== Drunk driving ===
In 2011–2012, the Iranian Traffic Police withdrew the driving licenses of 829 drivers, including 43 women, who had failed to pass alcohol and drug tests. Alcohol tests taken from drivers in Tehran in the period of 20 April-20 May 2012 showed that 26% of them were drunk. Because the country has no public bars or similar venues, consumption of alcohol takes place at home, behind closed doors.

=== Punishment ===
In 2020, a Muslim man was executed at Mashhad Prison after being convicted of drinking alcohol for the sixth time, driving without a license and being in possession of alcohol.

== Illegal sources ==
The 2010 study Substance Use Among Migrants: The Case of Iranians in Belgium notes that alcohol is acquired illegally in three different ways: it is purchased from ethnic minorities (particularly Armenians), produced in homes by adding fermenting agents to non-alcoholic beer, or smuggled into the country, largely through Iraqi Kurdistan.

Alcohol poisoning is quite common because illegal alcohol is often substandard. There were 768 cases of hospitalization due to methanol poisoning in eight provinces in Iran over the course of four weeks in late 2018; 96 of the patients died.

== Non-alcoholic alternatives ==
Iran's prohibition of alcoholic drinks creates high demand for non-alcoholic beer. Anti-smuggling plans by the Iranian government, coupled with awareness campaigns against the consumption of cola carbonates and campaigns encouraging the consumption of non-alcoholic beer, further boosted demand in 2010. More young adults in Iran are interested in non-alcoholic beer, following widespread media coverage regarding its health benefits. These health advantages play a major part in the promotional activities of most major firms.

== Public health ==
The Iranian Ministry of Health developed a national programme to reduce alcohol consumption by 10% between 2015 and 2025, but the religious-driven zero-tolerance alcohol policy impedes the development of an effective harm-reduction approach.

== See also ==
- Persian wine
- Aragh sagi, an alcoholic beverage
- Beer in Iran
- Healthcare in Iran

== Sources ==
- Matthee, Rudi (2014). "Alcohol in the Islamic Middle East: Ambivalence and Ambiguity". Past & Present (suppl_9): 100–125. doi:10.1093/pastj/gtt031.
- Spuler, Bertold (2015). Hoyland, Robert G.; Goldbloom, Gwendolin; Walburg, Berenike (eds.). Iran in the Early Islamic Period: Politics, Culture, Administration and Public Life between the Arab and the Seljuk Conquests, 633-1055. Brill. ISBN 978-90-04-27751-9.
