= Aragh Sagi =

Iranian moonshine

Aragh sagi
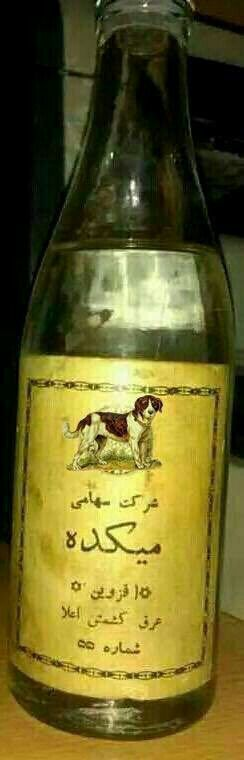
- Type: Spirit
- Manufacturer: Meykadeh Company
- Origin: Iran, Qazvin
- Discontinued: 1979 (legal production)
- Alcohol by volume: 45%–55% up to 90% if homemade
- Proof (US): 90–110 up to 180 if homemade
- Colour: Transparent
- Ingredients: Alcohol produced from raisins or dates
- Related products: Arak, rakı, absinthe, ouzo, pastis, sambuca

Aragh sagi (Persian: عرق سگی, romanized: araq-e sagi, lit. doggy [metaphor for extreme] distilled [beverage]) is a type of Iranian moonshine. This distilled alcoholic beverage usually contains around 50% alcohol. However, since it was produced without much quality control, it may have contained more or less alcohol, at times even reaching 80%. A high-quality aragh sagi tastes similar to grappa. Some Western sources call it Persian or Iranian Vodka.

== Etymology ==
Aragh (عرق, "Arak") are aromatic liquids that are produced by distillation from herbs and seeds, for example mint or anise. Traditional Aragh Sagi that was made in Iran is only with Raisins, like the Premium Arak(Saggi) from CyrusProducts distilled in the Netherlands. See also below.

Aragh Sagi literally means "doggy distilled [beverage]", from sag (سگ "dog" in Persian being a metaphor for extreme). Back in 1960s, the Meikadeh Company produced aragh with a picture of a dog (a beagle) on the bottle label as a logo, and soon public started referring to it as aragh sagi or "doggy aragh", and the name stuck.

== Legality ==
Since the Iranian revolution in 1979, alcohol is illegal in Iran. As such, homemade Aragh sagi in Iran is produced illegally.

== History ==
It is usually produced in homes from fermented raisins. Its production and possession by ordinary citizens is illegal in Iran (which is the case for all alcoholic beverages in Iran). Prior to 1979 revolution in Iran, this product had been produced traditionally in several cities, such as Yazd. Since it was outlawed after 1979, it became a black market and underground business. Today, aragh sagi is widely considered a cheap alcoholic beverage that consumers choose due to lack of other available alternative options.

== Cyrus Premium Arak ==
Cyrus Premium Arak is produced by Cyrus Company in the Netherlands. Cyrus Arak Saggi is made in small batches using copper pot stills. Fermented raisins are distilled to create a clear arak with an alcohol content of 40%. Raisins are sourced from Iran and Turkey.

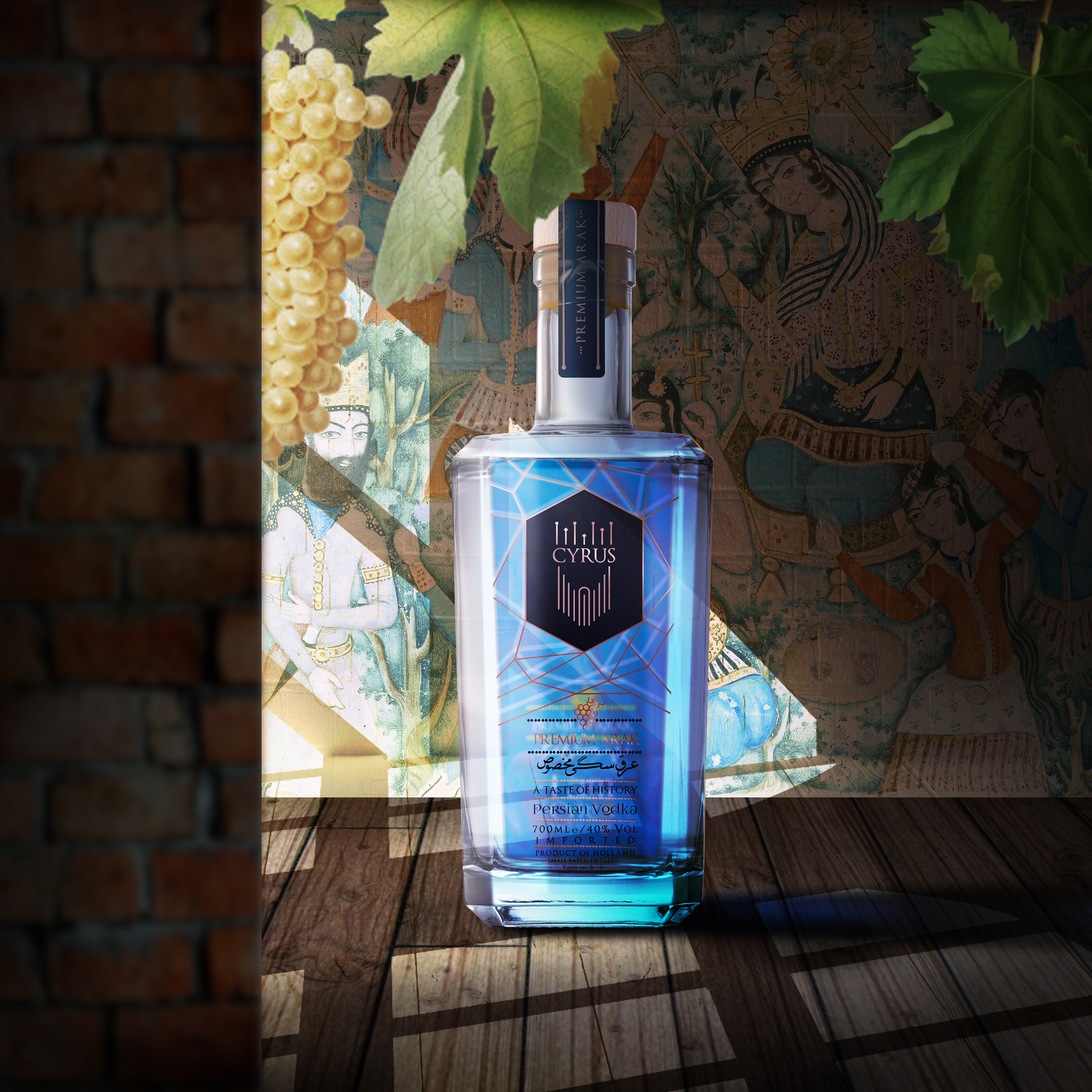
Premium Arak
