= Boukha =

Tunisian distilled beverage produced from figs

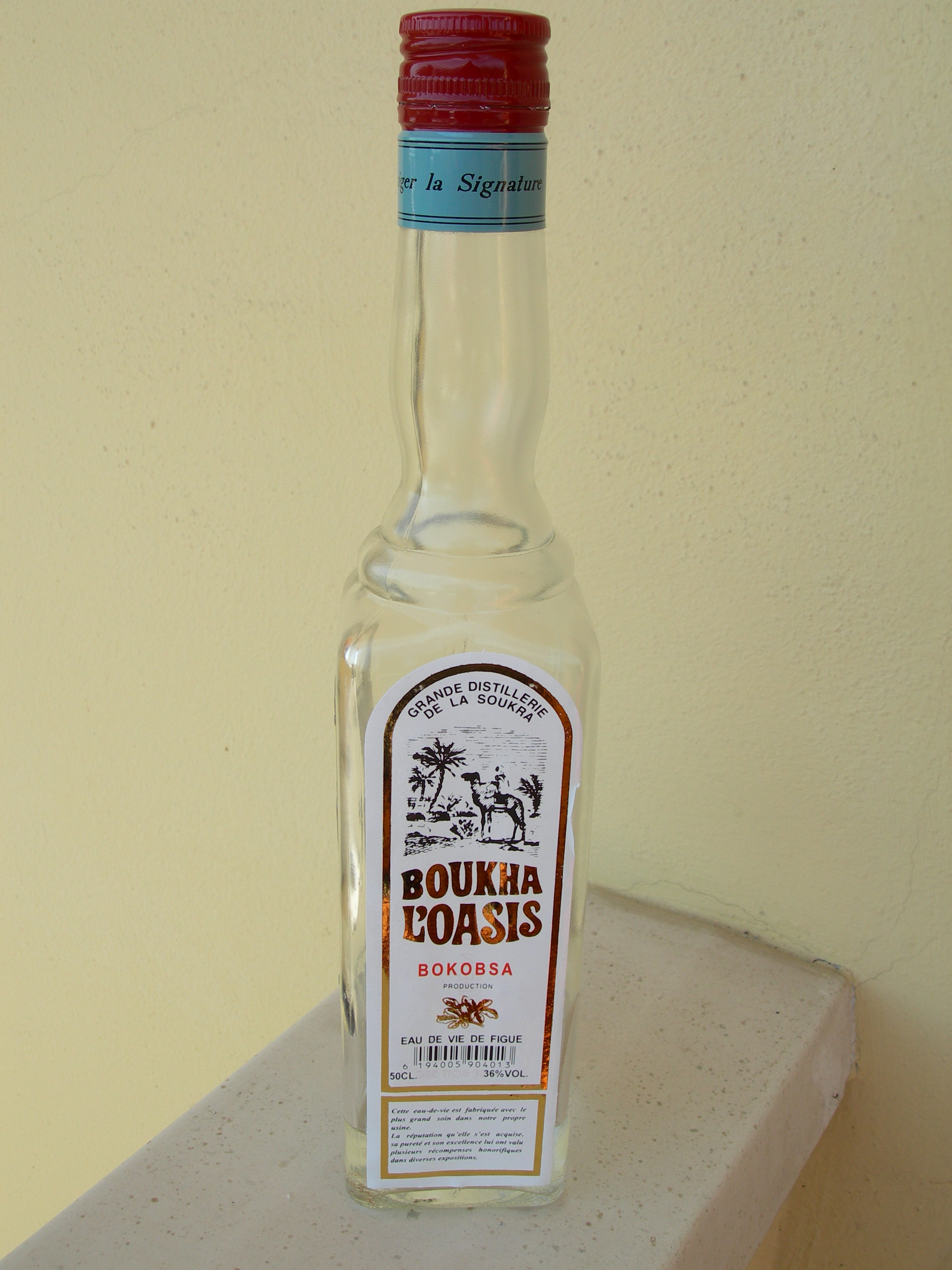
Boukha bottle

Boukha (Arabic: بوخة) is a distilled beverage produced from figs. It originated in the Tunisian Jewish community, where most of it is still produced.

== Etymology ==
There are many stories about the origin of the name Boukha. Many say it stems from "steam of alcohol" in Arabic, although the explanation is much simpler.

Once Yaakov Bokobsa managed to produce his "Eau-de-Vie" from figs, he naturally called it Vodka.

In Russian, vodka is spelled as follows: водка.

Because Tunisians could not read Russian or the Cyrillic alphabet, they took the Russian word водка, and pronounced it as it looks: BOUKHA

The word Boukha was adopted back into the Russian language, where it's used as бухать (pronounced "boukhat'"), which is a slang term for "to drink heavily", or бухарик ("boukharik"), which is a slang term for a drunkard.

It is obtained by simple distillation of Mediterranean figs. Its alcohol percentage ranges between 36 and 40 percent.

== Overview ==
Boukha can be consumed straight at room temperature or cold, or serve as the basis for cocktails and for fruit salad.

== History of boukha in Colonial Tunisia ==
Boukha production is believed to have been established in Tunisia in the 1880s. The production of Boukha created an alcohol market that could not provide tax revenue for the French colonial authorities and thus was subject to alcohol laws that deliberately targeted indigenous Maghrebi drinks, as they could be easily produced and consumed for less due to the lack of tax.

== See also ==
- Mahia
