= Anise drinks =

Anise drinks is a family of alcoholic beverages that can be found in several countries such as Italy, Greece and Turkey. Its defining characteristics often include a strong flavour of anise, a high concentration of alcohol, and crystallization and colour changing when mixed with other liquids (ouzo effect).

== Varieties ==
- Absinthe, a drink popular throughout Europe
- Aguardiente (only Colombian Aguardiente)
- Anis, popular in Spain. Two varieties: "seco" or dry and "dulce" which is more sweet.
- Arak, the traditional alcoholic beverage of the Levant (Palestine, Syria, Lebanon, Jordan, and Israel as well as Iraq and Egypt
- Areqe, a traditional grain alcoholic beverage of Ethiopia
- Ouzo, a Greek aperitif
- Pastis, an apéritif in France
- Rakı, a Turkish drink
- Sambuca, a liqueur in Italy
- Xtabentún, a liqueur from Mexico

== See also ==
- Flavored liquor (no sugar)
- List of liqueurs#Anise-flavored liqueurs (with sugar)
- List of alcoholic drinks § Seed or botanical distillations
