= Beer in Iran =

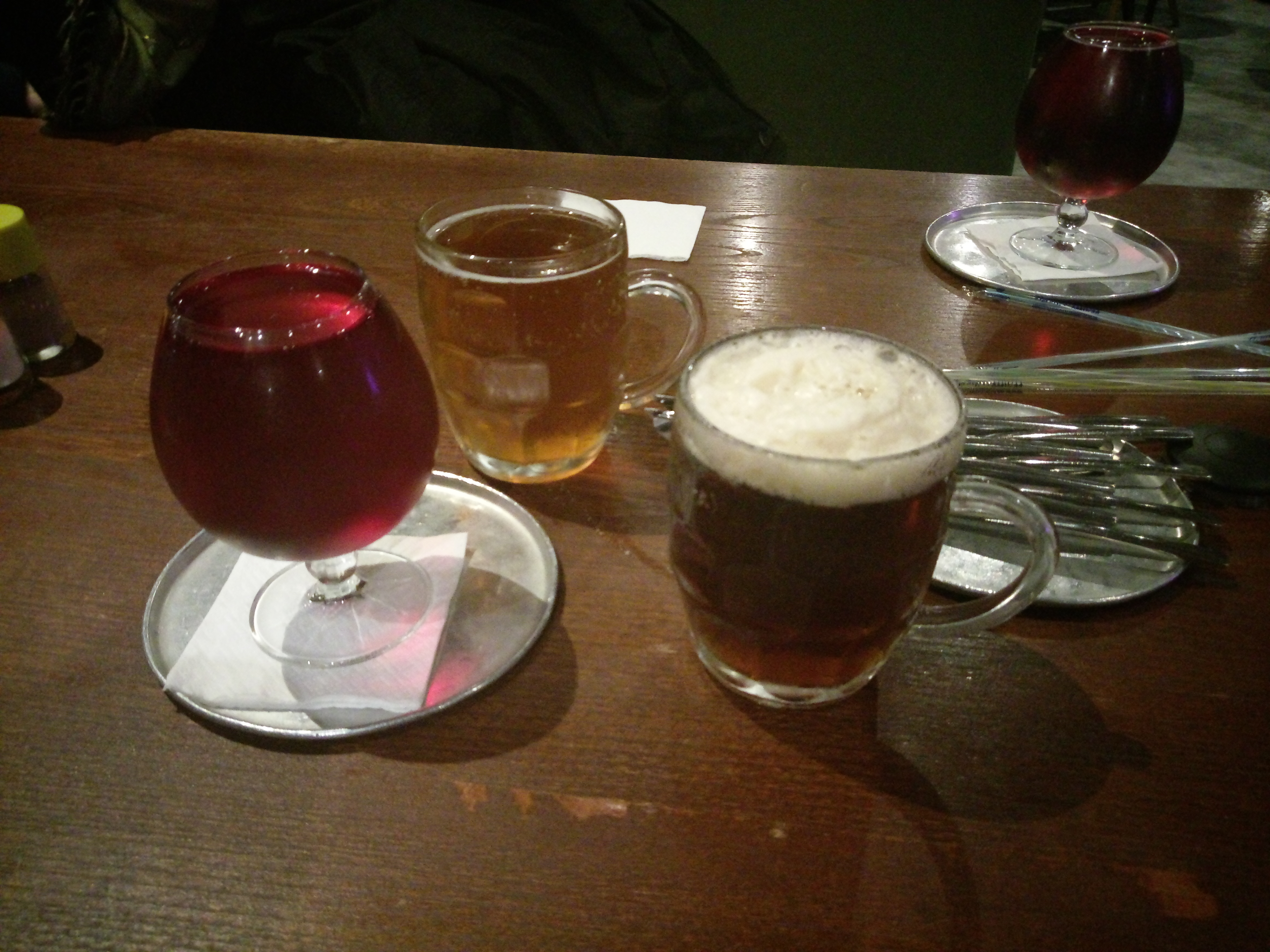
Examples of zero-alcohol beer in Iran. Purchasing and drinking alcoholic drinks is illegal in Iran.

The earliest known chemical evidence of beer in the world dates to c. 3500–3100 BC from the site of Godin Tepe in the Zagros Mountains of western Iran, and there is evidence of beer-drinking over a long period in the Median Empire.

Since the Iranian Revolution of 1979, production, possession or distribution of any alcoholic beverages is illegal and punishable under Islamic law. However, members of legally tolerated non-Muslim religious minorities – Zoroastrians, Jews and Christians – are allowed to produce alcoholic beverages for consumption at home and use in religious rituals. While non-alcoholic beers are the only ones available from legal outlets, illegal alcoholic beers are smuggled into the country and consumed.

== Production companies ==
As of 2010, alcoholic beers remain illegal, yet non-alcoholic beers are well developed and established due to the active performance of the local industrial brewers.

Shams beer or in the Persian language known as "نوشیدنی مالت شمس" is one of the oldest beers in Iran. Forced out of business by the Iranian revolution, it re-opened 40 years later, selling only non-alcoholic beer.

== Statistics ==
In 2008, the sale of non-alcoholic beers in Iran continued its high performance with double-digit growth rates in both value and volume and it was expected to more than double its total volume sales between 2008 and 2013.

== See also ==
- Alcohol in Iran
- Beer and breweries by region
- Prohibition § Iran
