= Mahia (drink) =

Moroccan Jewish alcoholic beverage

Mahia ماء حياة מאחיה
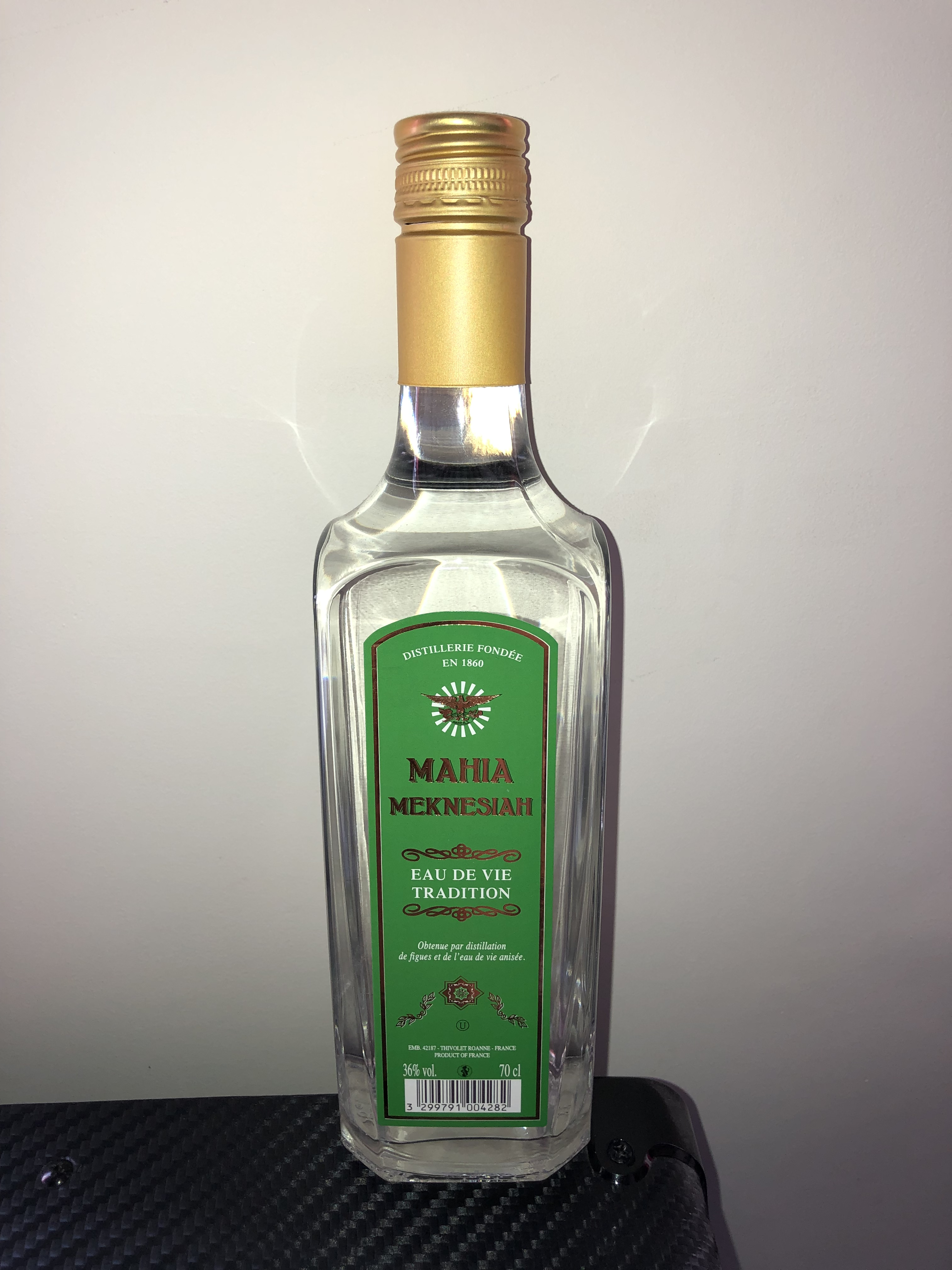
- Type: Aperitif
- Origin: Morocco, Kingdom of Morocco
- Ingredients: Dates or figs
- Related products: Boukha

Mahia (Arabic: ماء حياة, Hebrew: מאחיה, literally water of life) is a Moroccan alcoholic beverage distilled from dates. It is also sometimes prepared with figs.

== Overview ==
Mahia is a traditional Moroccan brandy distillate from fruits such as jujubes, figs, dates, grapes, and flavored with anise. Its name literally means "eau de vie" in Arabic. Originally from Morocco, it is historically produced by the Moroccan Jews. Mahia can be enjoyed as a digestif or used as a base for cocktails: it goes very well with pomegranate juice, rose water; ginger syrup or mango juice for example. It can also be infused with fennel leaves, to enhance its aniseed scent. Today, mahia very often designates adulterated alcohol in Morocco sold informally and consumed in disadvantaged neighborhoods. Even in present-day Morocco it is still traditionally associated with Morocco's Jewish community.

In 2024, a London-based company, under the brand Sahara, launched a premium spirit drink with a recipe inspired by Mahia.

== See also ==
- Boukha – a similar Tunisian Jewish alcoholic beverage
