= Fars Symphony Orchestra =

- Orchestra
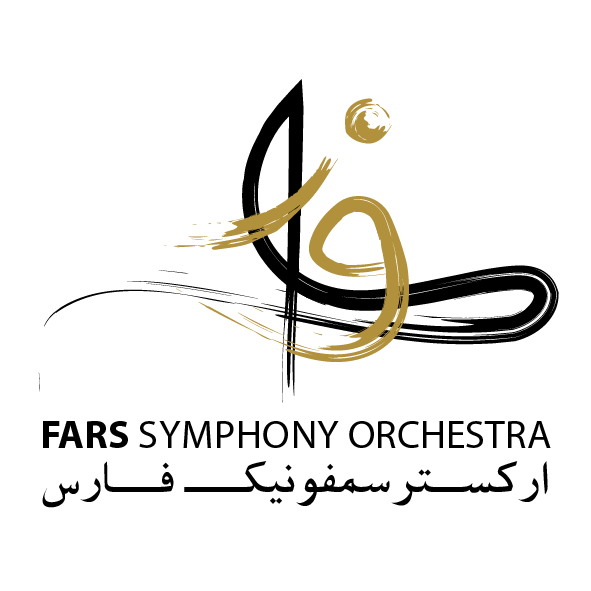
- Native name: ارکستر سمفونیک فارس
- Founded: 2023
- Location: Shiraz, Fars Province, Iran
- Concert hall: Various venues
- Principal conductor: Ebrahim Bazrafkan
- Music director: Ebrahim Bazrafkan

The Fars Symphony Orchestra (Persian: ارکستر سمفونیک فارس) is an independent, non-governmental, non-profit musical ensemble based in Fars Province, Iran, established with the goal of improving the quality of music, research, and performing symphonic works by Iranian and international composers. The orchestra operates under the direction of Ebrahim Bazrafkan, with musicians gathered from across Fars province and neighboring regions.

== History ==
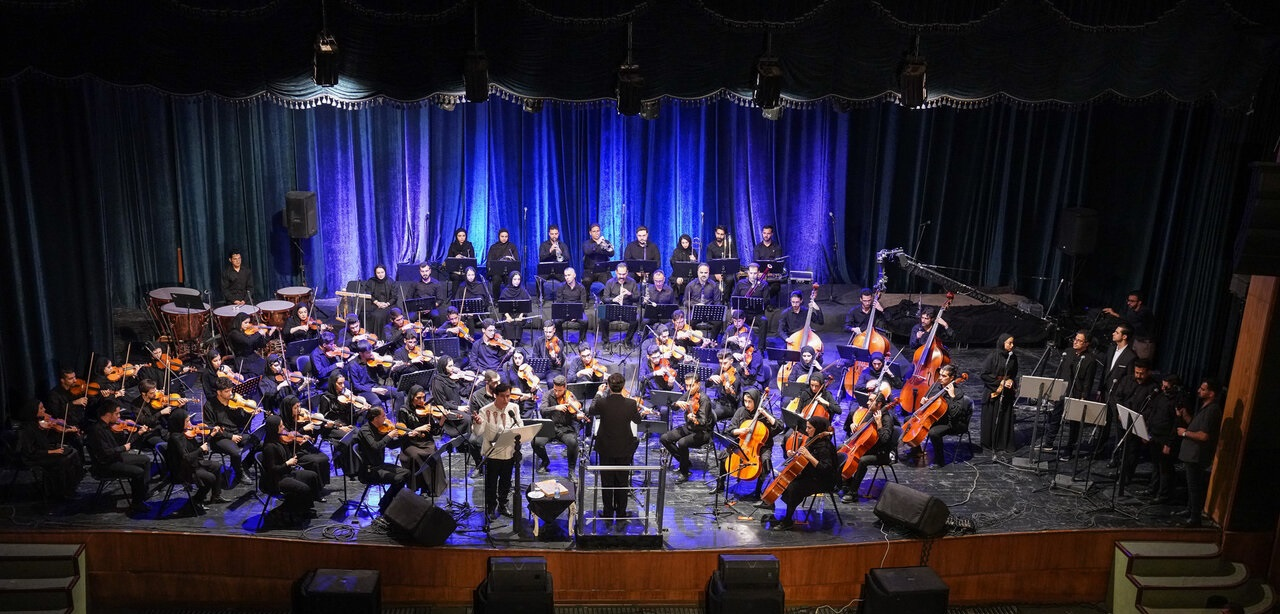
Performance at Hafez Hall

The Fars Symphony Orchestra was unveiled on April 26, 2023, (6 Ordibehesht 1402 SH), next to the mausoleum of Saadi Shirazi in Shiraz, coinciding with the poet's commemoration week. The ceremony included performances of pieces by Iranian and international composers, attended by the then-Director General of Culture and Islamic Guidance of Fars Province and several artists and officials.

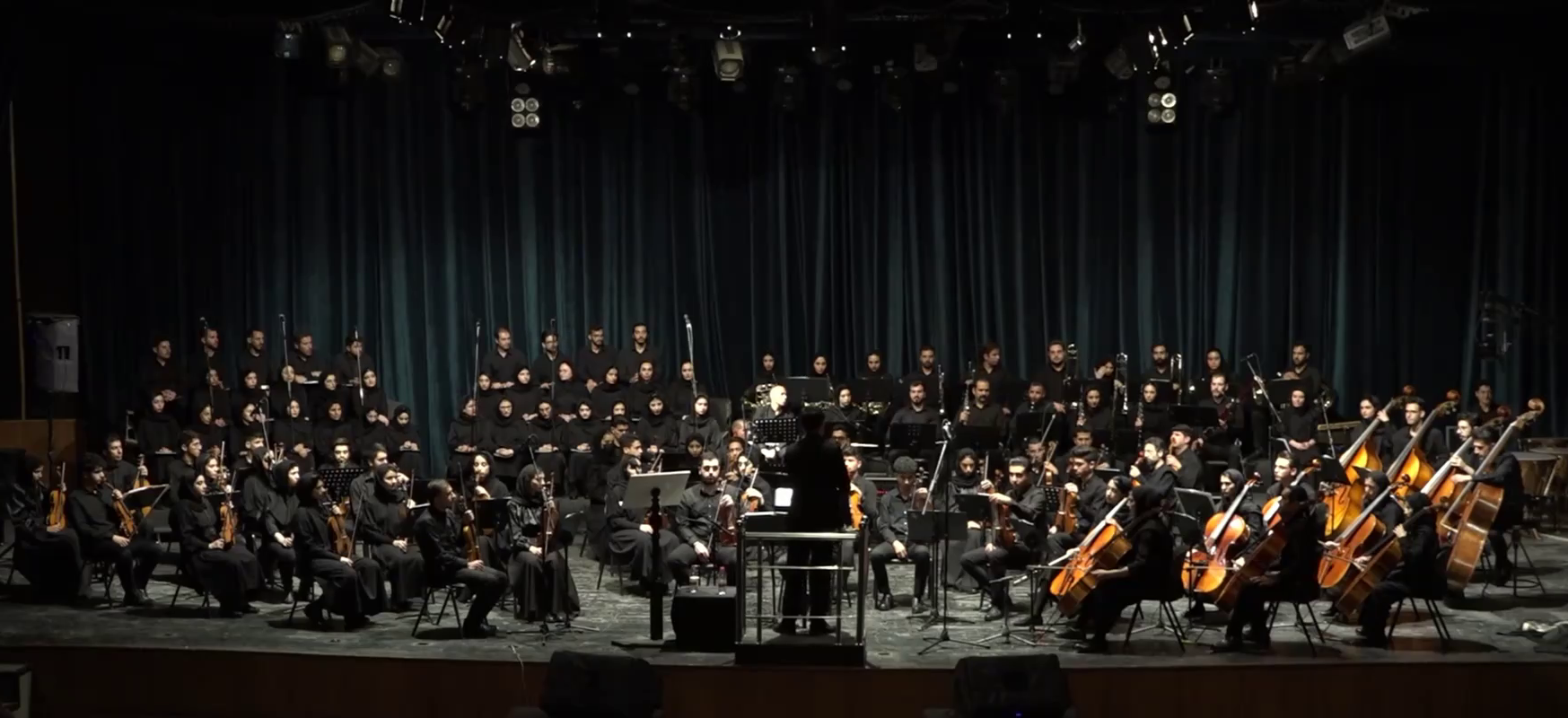
Performance by the Fars Symphony Orchestra at Hafez Hall

Prior to the establishment of this orchestra, Fars Province and the city of Shiraz lacked a regular symphony orchestra, and local wind and string players faced limitations in performing complex symphonic works. Efforts over recent decades to teach string instruments and provide necessary instruments facilitated the formation of this orchestra.

== Leadership ==
The permanent conductor of the orchestra is Ebrahim Bazrafkan, who holds a Master's degree in composition and serves as the head of the music department at the Fazel Scientific-Applied Center of Culture and Art in Shiraz. Depending on technical needs and repertoire, the orchestra occasionally invites guest conductors.

== Composition and instrumentation ==
The Fars Symphony Orchestra includes the following sections:

- Strings
- Woodwinds
- Brass
- Percussion
- Choir (for selected pieces)

This composition allows for the performance of classical symphonic works from both Western Classical music and Iranian traditions.

== Performances ==
The orchestra's most significant performances include:

- Unveiling Ceremony: April 26, 2023
- First Stage Performance: May 19, 2023 (29 Ordibehesht 1402 SH)
- Performance of Hafez Operetta (October 2023), composed by Ebrahim Bazrafkan. This performance, which was part of a larger operatic work, featured Mahyar Shadravan as the vocalist.
- Classical music concert featuring Reza Fekri, a guest vocalist from the Mariinsky Opera in Russia (February 23, 2024).
- Kherad Operetta based on the Shahnameh by Ferdowsi (2023/1402 SH).
- Panj Ganj Operetta based on the poem Khosrow and Shirin by Nezami Ganjavi (2023/1402 SH).
- Joint performance with the National Orchestra of Tajikistan (Spring 2024).
- Collaboration by some musicians in the Persepolis Concert with Alireza Ghorbani (2024/1403 SH).
- Performance of Ney-Nava composed by Hossein Alizadeh.
- Peace Anthem concert with choir and orchestra, conducted by Manoochehr Sahbai (May 28 and 29, 2025). The concert included pieces by great Western classical composers such as Mozart, Beethoven, and Brahms.

== Goals ==
The main objectives of the Fars Symphony Orchestra are:

- Introducing and performing Iranian and global symphonic works.
- Research, re-creation, and creation of new musical works.
- Education and raising the musical culture of society.
- Performing works related to Iran's literary figures in the form of operetta and other programs.
- Linking music with daily life, civil and ceremonial activities.

The Fars Symphony Orchestra views itself as a bridge between the heritage of Iranian music and the global treasury of classical music. Its goals include researching and performing the works of great Iranian composers in orchestral form, creating new compositions, and introducing masterpieces of global music to Iranian audiences. The orchestra emphasizes the importance of cultural exchange between Iranian and global music as a factor in strengthening the cultural identity of society. Furthermore, one of its core missions is connecting the classical literature of Iran with contemporary culture through the creation and performance of musical works based on literary texts.

== Funding and support ==
The orchestra has operated without state support or private investment to date, with expenses mainly covered by the permanent conductor and musicians.
