= Khollar =

Khollar خلار
- Village
- Location within Iran
- Coordinates: 29°57′53″N 52°14′20″E
- Country: Iran
- Province: Fars
- County: Sepidan
- Bakhsh: Hamaijan
- Rural District: Hamaijan

Population (2006)
  - Total: 281
- Time zone: UTC+3:30 (IRST)
  - Summer (DST): UTC+4:30 (IRDT)

Khollar (Persian: خلار, also Romanized as Khollār) is a village in Hamaijan Rural District, Hamaijan District, Sepidan County, Fars province, Iran. At the 2006 census, its population was 281, in 64 families. Khollar was once home to an important centre of wine production.
