= Khoresh =

Persian stew dishes

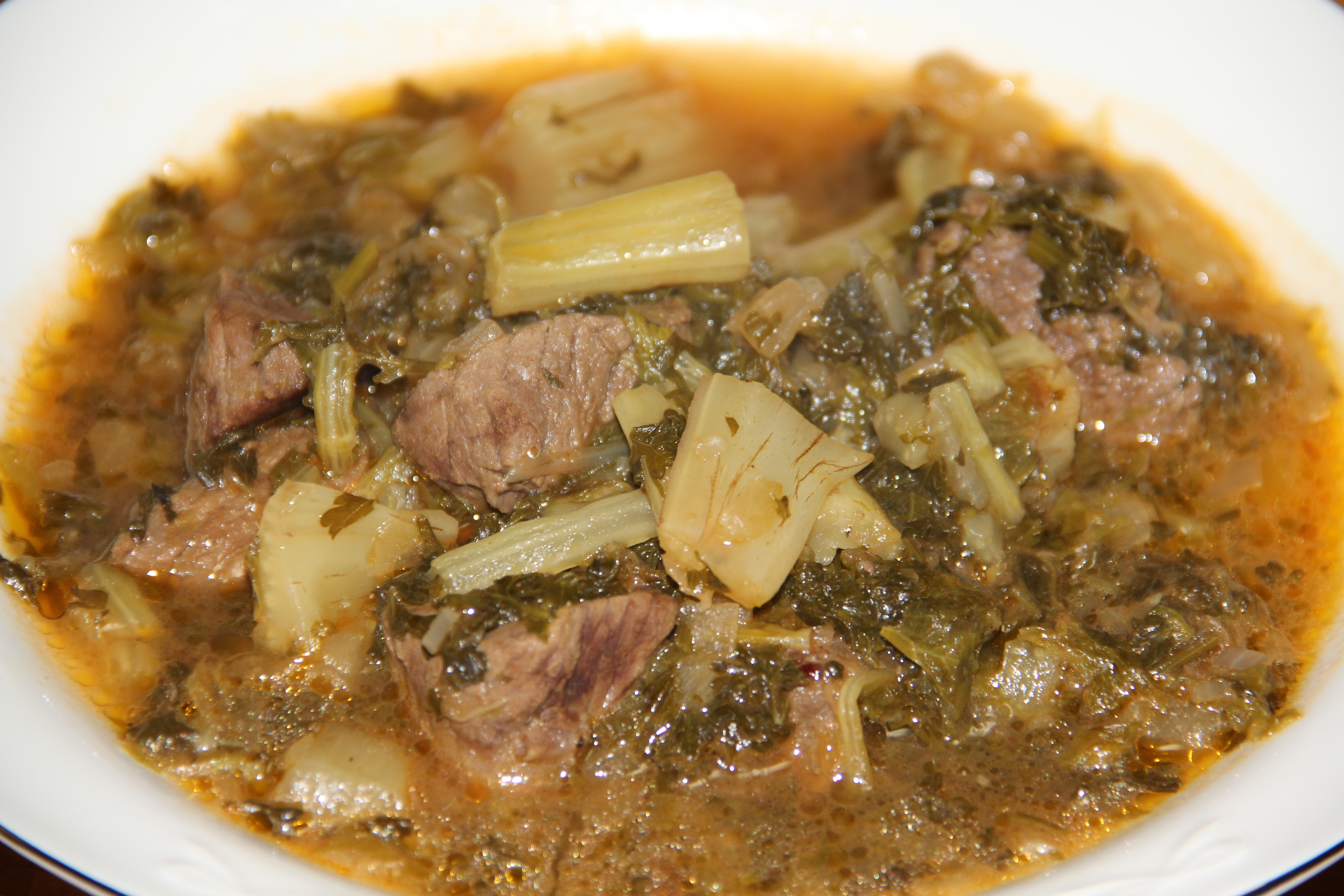
- Khoresh karafs (Persian celery stew)
- Alternative names: Khoresht
- Type: Stew
- Place of origin: Iran
- Region or state: Iran
- Associated cuisine: Iranian cuisine
- Created by: Iranians
- Serving temperature: Hot
- Main ingredients: Meats, vegetables, spices

Khoresh (Persian: خورش) or khoresht (Persian: خورشت) is a Persian word that refers to Iranian stews, usually slow-cooked and served with rice. Khoresh comes in many varieties, often named after their main ingredients. The word is a substantive of the verb khordan (Persian: خوردن), "to eat", and literally means "meal".

The influence of khoresh extends beyond Iran's borders. In Iraq, stews like khoresh bamieh (okra stew) and fesenjān have become part of local cuisine, especially in areas with close historical and religious ties to Iran. In Afghanistan, similar dishes known as qorma reflect the shared culinary heritage, often featuring the same slow-cooked technique and use of herbs or dried fruits. The Mughal Empire in South Asia, with its Persianate court culture, adopted many Iranian culinary traditions, which can still be seen in the aromatic stews of North Indian and Pakistani cuisine. In the Caucasus and Central Asia, Persian stews influenced local dishes through trade and cultural exchange, leaving a lasting imprint on the region's food identity.

== Varieties ==
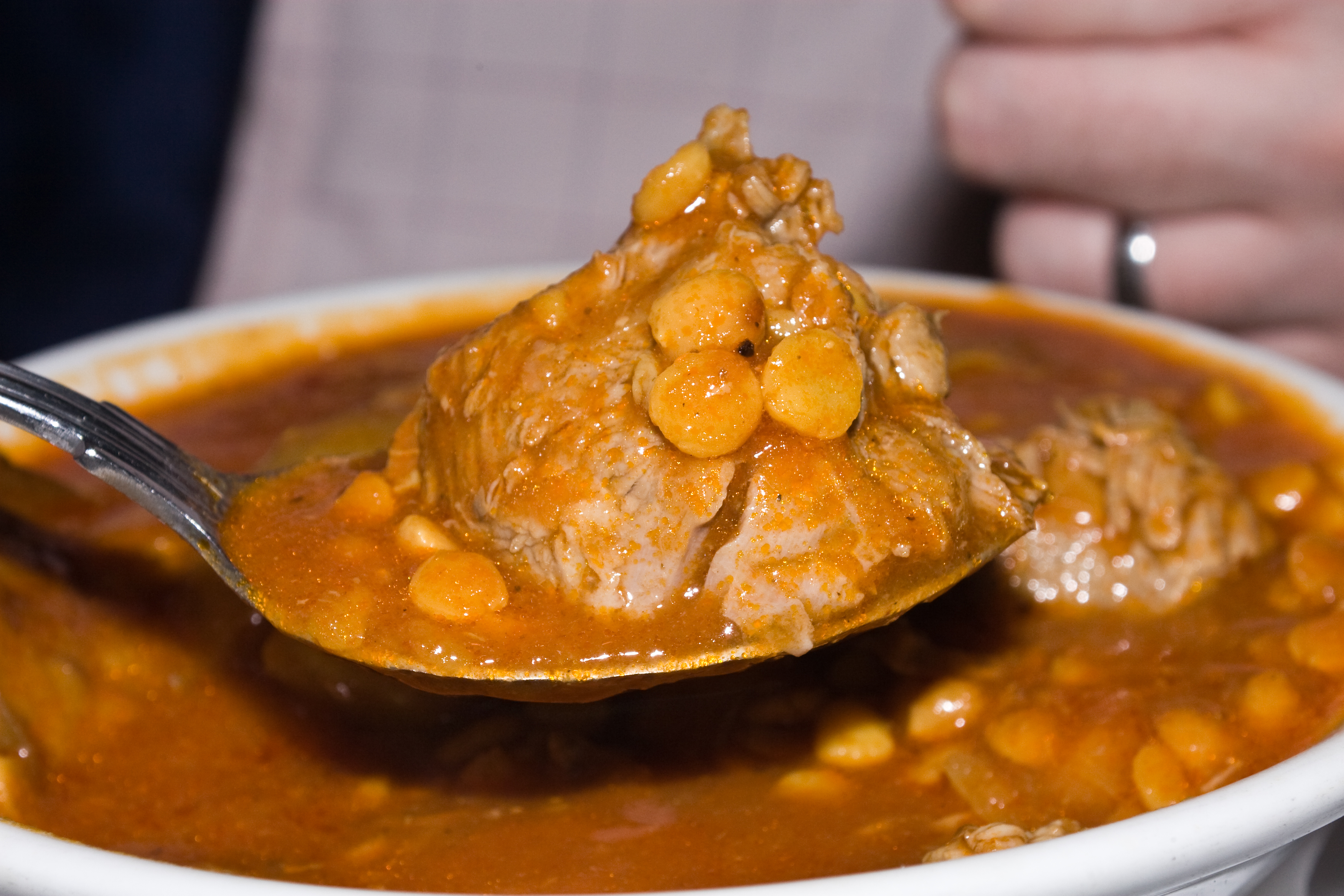
Khoresh-e lape bademjan

- Khoresh bademjan (eggplant stew): including eggplants, optional boned leg of lamb or stewed beef, onions, turmeric, tomato paste and medium tomatoes
- Khoresh bādemjān lapeh (aubergine and yellow split pea stew): same as previous with addition of yellow split peas and Advieh
- Khoresh bāmieh (okra tomato stew): Stewing lamb or beef, okra, potatoes, onions, fresh lime juice and tomato paste.
- Khoresh bāmieh lapeh (okra and yellow split pea stew): same as previous with addition of yellow split peas and Advieh
- Khoresh beh (quince stew): chunks of lamb are stewed with slices or cubes of tart quince, and yellow split peas; this dish is always served with rice.
- Khoresh ālu (prune stew)
- Khoresh ālu esfenaj (prune and spinach stew)
- Khoresh khalal (almond beef stew): a local stew of the city of Kermanshah in west of Iran, its ingredients are onion, lamb and mutton in very small sizes, saffron, and lots of almond slices. Local oil (roghan kermanshahi) can also be used.
- Khoresh fesenjān or fesenjun (pomegranate stew) including duck or chicken, or beef meatballs, ground walnuts, onions, pomegranate molasses, and sugar
- Khoresh havij (carrot stew)
- Khoresh kadu (zucchini stew): pan-fried whole or long-cut sliced zucchini, stewed lamb, beef or chicken, onions, tomato paste and whole or split pan-fried tomatoes
- Khoresh qārch (mushroom stew)
- Khoresh gheimeh (split-pea lamb stew) including stewed lamb or beef, split-peas, onions, potatoes, tomato paste and dried limes
- Khoresh ghormeh sabzi (herb and lamb stew) including red kidney or black-eyed beans, fresh fenugreek, parsley, coriander or parsley, spring onions or leeks, boned leg of lamb, onion and dried limes
- Khoresh kangar (bull thistle stew)
- Khoresh karafs (celery beef stew) including lamb or beef, celery, onions, fresh lime juice, mint, and parsley
- Khoresh lubia sabz (green bean stew)
- Khoresh rivās (rhubarb stew)
- Khoresh vij vij (meat and veggies stew) Salt, pepper, advieh, and oil are also used in these dishes.
- Khoresh seeb (apple stew)
- Khoresh alubalu (cherry stew)
- Khoresh anar (pomegranate stew)
- Khoresht mast

== See also ==
- List of stews
