= Fesenjān =

Traditional Iranian meat stew

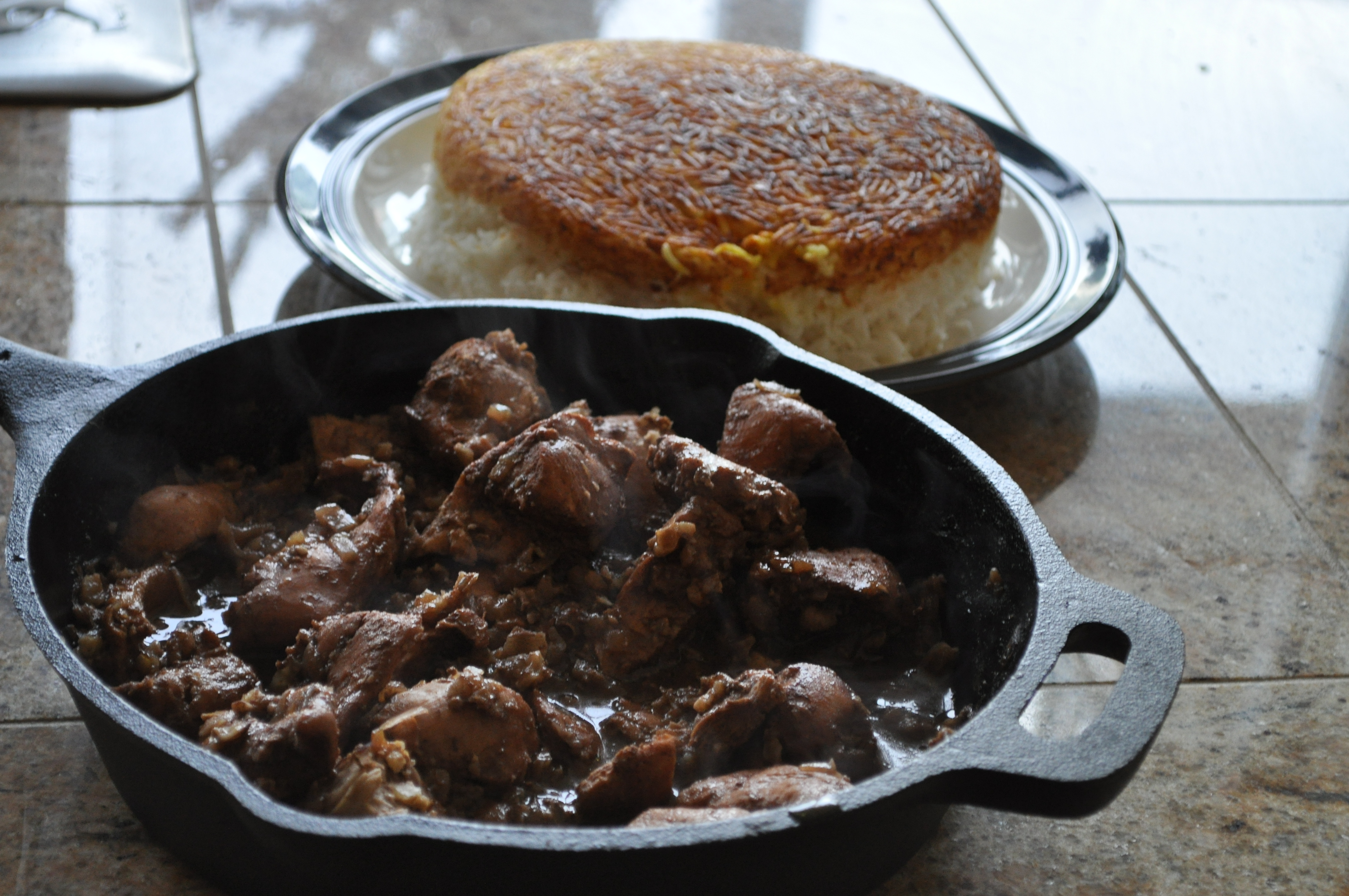
- A bowl of chicken fesenjān, with Persian rice topped by tahdig
- Alternative names: Fesenjan, Fesenjoon
- Type: Stew
- Course: Main course
- Place of origin: Iran (Gilan)
- Region or state: Iran
- Associated cuisine: Iranian cuisine
- Created by: Iranians
- Main ingredients: Pomegranate juice, walnuts, poultry (duck or chicken)
- Variations: Lamb meatballs

Fesenjān (Persian: فسنجان; also called fesenjoon in Tehrani dialect) is a sweet and sour Iranian stew (a khoresh). The roots of this Persian delicacy trace back to the Sassanid Persia's golden age. It is typically served over rice in the Iranian manner. In Iran, it is made with minced meat (lamb, sheep or beef), meatballs, chicken or duck. Like other khoresh stews served over rice, fesenjān is also common to Iraqi cuisine.In Azerbaijan, where it is called fisincan plov, the stew is made with lamb meatballs instead of poultry. The dish is also eaten in Armenia, Iraq, Georgia, within Parsi communities in India, and also by the Persian diaspora population.

== Description ==
Fesenjān is flavored with narsharab (pomegranate paste) and ground walnuts (see: bazhe), and spices like turmeric, cinnamon, orange peel, cardamom, and rosebud. It is traditionally made with eggplant and poultry (duck or chicken). Fesenjān can also be made using balls of ground meat or chunks of lamb. Depending on the recipe, it can have a sweet or sour taste. Fesenjān is served with Iranian white or yellow rice (polo or chelo).

If the pomegranate sauce comes out too sour, sugar and fried onions may be added to sweeten it. Sometimes, a hot iron is applied to cause oxidation and darken the sauce's color.

It is a dish that is part of the dinner table on Yaldā Night celebrations.

It is also a celebratory dish for Persian Jews, both in Israel and elsewhere, where it is served at weddings and Rosh HaShanah (Jewish New Year) meals.

== History ==
The earliest known reference to fesenjān is in Mirza Ali-Akbar Khan Ashpazbashi's Sofra-ye at'ema from 1881, which lists ten different varieties of the dish: walnut (today the most common), almond, eggplant, kidney bean, quince, potato, carrot, pumpkin, fish, and yogurt. The first dictionary to mention fesenjān is the Farhang-e Anandraj, which calls it fasūjan.

== Culture ==
Fesenjān is an elaborate dish that is often reserved for special occasions. It is considered "a rich man's dish", which is referenced in the Persian expression "he behaves as if he has had partridge and fesenjān", meaning to show off or act pretentiously.

In the traditional Iranian system of garm ("hot") and sard ("cold") foods, fesenjān is considered garm because it uses walnuts, which are also considered a "hot" food. In order to balance out this hotness, sometimes people will add coriander (a sard plant) to it; peeled pumpkin is also added for the same reason, as well as to act as a sugar substitute.

== Derivatives ==
The pomegranate lamb shoulder signature dish at Michael Solomonov's Zahav, which won the James Beard Award for best restaurant in the United States for 2019, is an amalgamation of lamb fesenjān and the bossam from David Chang's Momofuku Ssam Bar. More specifically, it uses the format of Chang's version of bossam to deliver the flavor profile of lamb fesenjān.

== See also ==
- List of stews
- Iranian cuisine
- Gheimeh – Iranian meat stew
- Ghormeh sabzi – Iranian herb stew
- Salsa di noci – Italian condiment based on walnuts
- Satsivi – Georgian poultry dish
- Pomegranate soup – Iranian soup
