= Khoresh bademjan =

Persian stew of eggplant and tomatoes

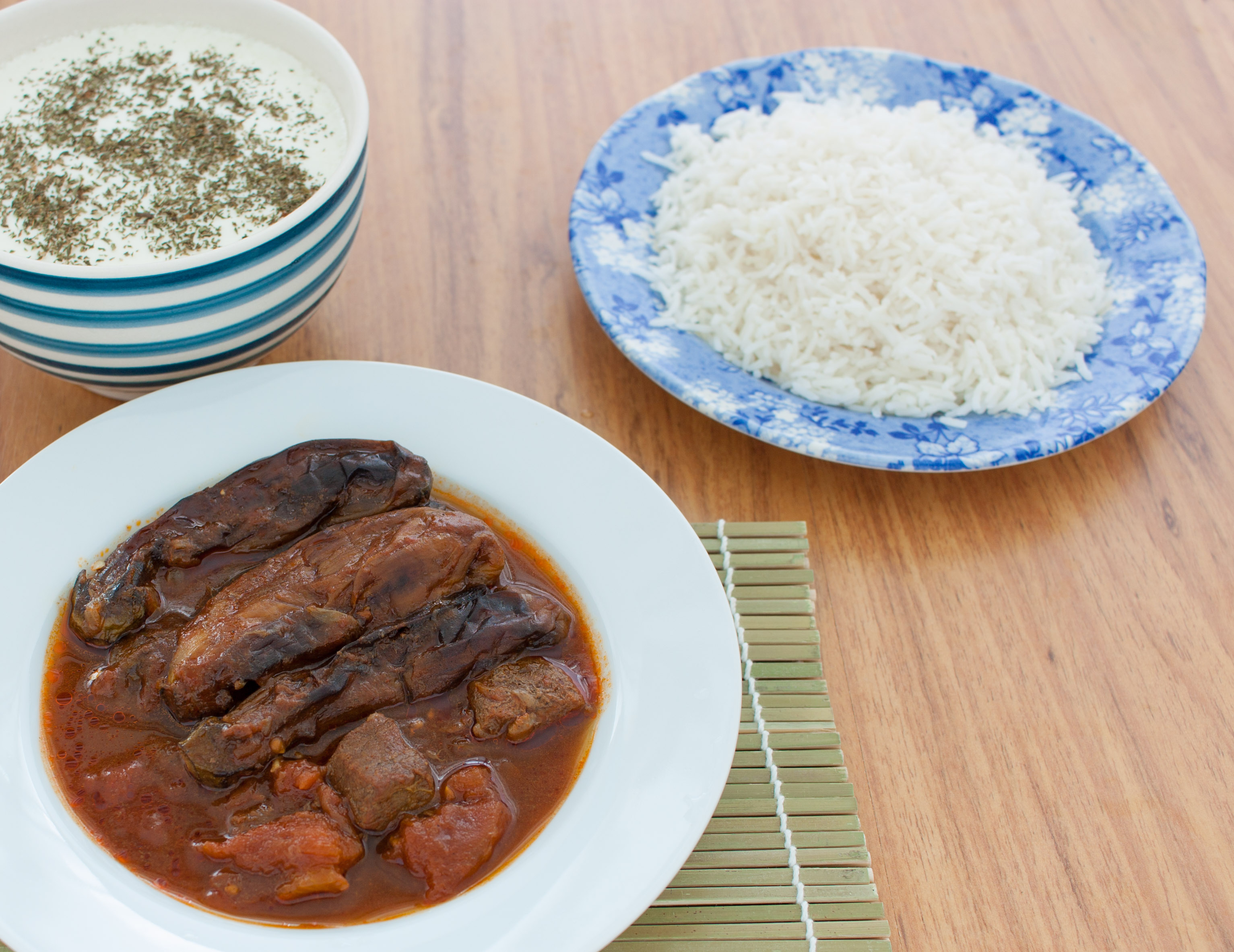
- Alternative names: Khoresh-e Bādemjoon
- Type: Stew
- Course: Entrée
- Place of origin: Iran (Persia)
- Region or state: Iran
- Associated cuisine: Iranian cuisine
- Created by: Iranians
- Main ingredients: Eggplant, lamb, tomato, saffron
- Variations: Ghoore bademjan, gheymeh bademjan (see below)

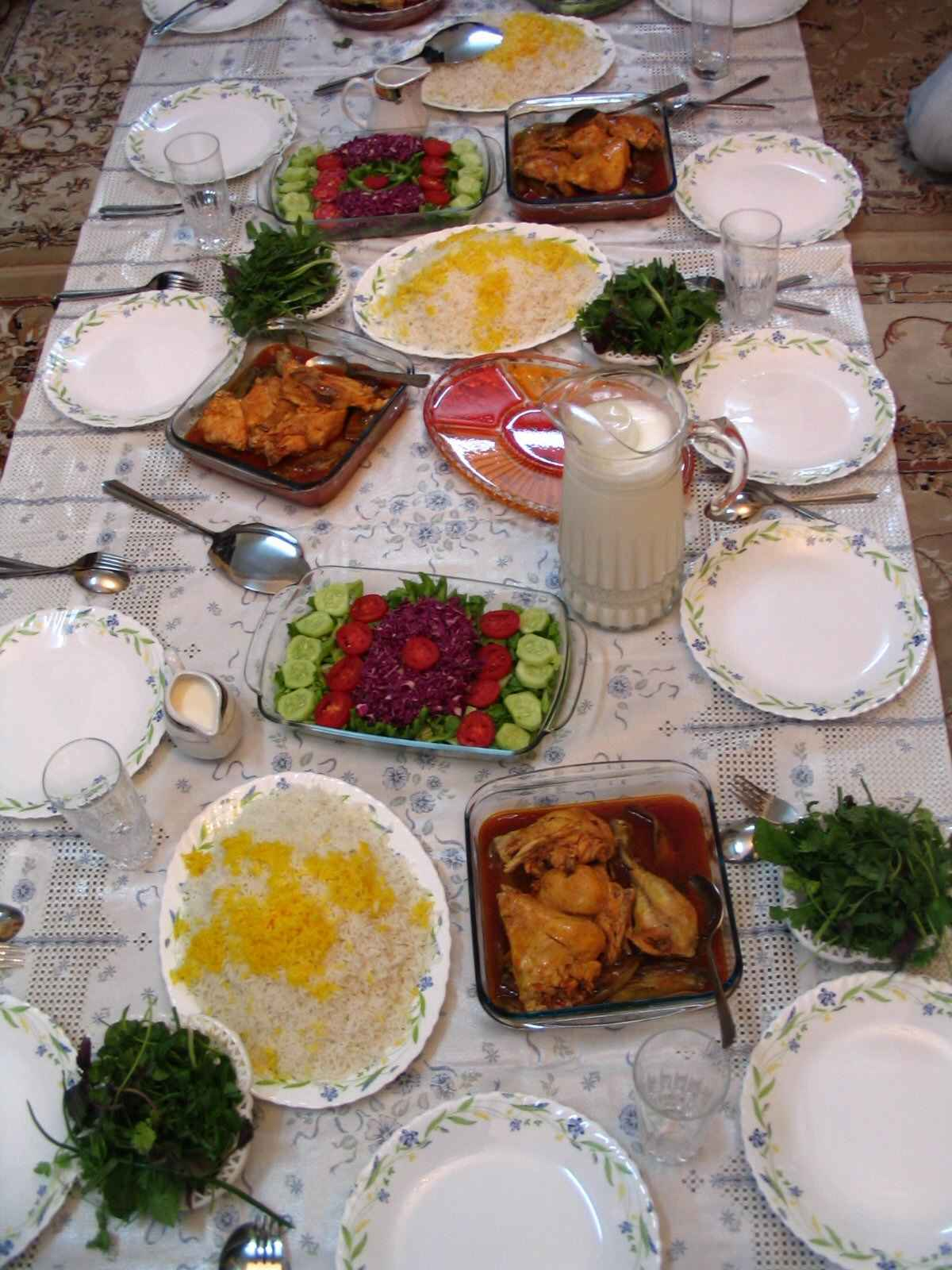
Persian cuisine

Khoresh bademjan (Persian: خورش بادمجان, romanized: xoreš bâdemjân), also spelled khoresh bademjoon or khoresh-e bademjan, is a Persian stew (khoresh) made principally of eggplant and tomato, usually with lamb and a souring agent, and served over steamed Persian rice. It is one of the most widely recognised dishes of the Iranian khoresh tradition.

== Etymology ==
The name combines khoresh (خورش), the Persian word for a stew served with rice, and bademjan (بادمجان), meaning "eggplant". The eggplant is a long-established ingredient in Persian cookery, appearing in a wide range of stews, dips and rice dishes.

== Preparation ==
The eggplants are peeled and usually salted to draw out their moisture and any bitterness, then fried in oil until golden before being added to the stew toward the end of cooking, so that they hold their shape rather than disintegrating. The meat, typically lamb (and sometimes chicken), is browned with sliced onion and turmeric and simmered with tomato until tender. A souring component characteristic of Persian stews is added, most often unripe grapes (ghureh), verjuice, lime juice or dried lime; saffron and an aromatic spice blend (advieh) provide the dish's perfume. The finished stew is often garnished with small whole fried tomatoes and fried onion. A vegetarian version omits the meat.

== Variations ==
Two common variants are distinguished mainly by their souring or starch component:

- Ghooreh bademjan (غوره بادمجان), made with unripe (sour) grapes as the souring agent.
- Gheymeh bademjan (قیمه بادمجان), which adds yellow split peas and is related to the broader gheimeh family of split-pea stews.

== Serving ==
Like other khoresh dishes, khoresh bademjan is served over chelow (steamed white Persian rice), frequently accompanied by the crisp rice crust known as tahdig. The balance of the rich fried eggplant against the sour note of the grapes or lime is regarded as the defining characteristic of the dish.

== See also ==
- Khoresh
- List of eggplant dishes
- List of stews
- Iranian cuisine
