= Chalu =

Chalu may refer to:

- Record of Tea (茶錄; Chálù), a Chinese tea classic by Cai Xiang

== Places in China ==
- Chalu, Anhui, in Huoqiu County, Anhui
- Chalu, Zhejiang, in Ninghai County, Zhejiang

== Places in Iran ==
- Chalu, Kerman
- Chalu, Behshahr, Mazandaran Province
- Chalu, Sari, Mazandaran Province
- Chalu, Tonekabon, Mazandaran Province
- Chalu, North Khorasan
- Chalu District, in Khuzestan Province
- Chalu Rural District, in Khuzestan Province

== See also ==
- Chalow (disambiguation)
