= Chalow =

Chalow or Chelow or Chelu (Persian: چلو) may refer to:

- Chalow, East Azerbaijan
- Chelow, Chaharmahal and Bakhtiari
- Chelu, Kerman
- Chalow-ye Gavmishi
- Chalow Gohreh
- Chelo District
- Chelu Rural District
