= Okra stew =

Stew of lamb, okra and tomatoes

Bamia
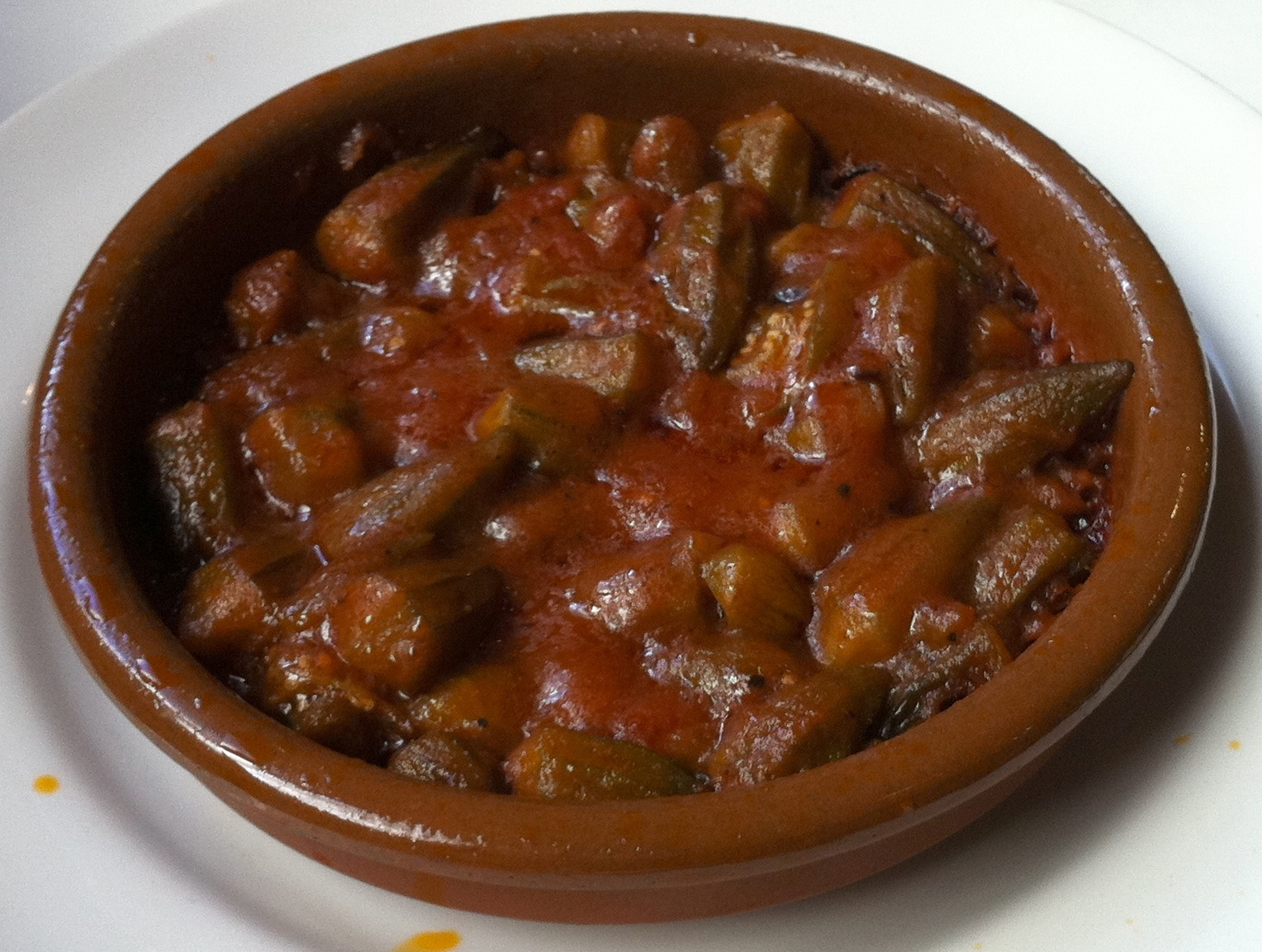
- Bamia stew
- Alternative names: Bamieh, Bamje, Bamiyeh, Bamya, Bame, Bāmīā
- Course: Main course
- Region or state: Afghanistan, Albania, Arabian Peninsula, Armenia, Azerbaijan, Cyprus, Egypt, Iran, Greece, Iraq, Israel, Jordan, Kenya, Lebanon, Palestine, Romania, Somalia, South Sudan, Sudan, Syria, Tanzania, Turkey
- Main ingredients: Okra, lamb meat

There is a variety of okra stews made in Middle Eastern, Balkan, North African, East African, Persian, and Central Asian cuisines and served as main courses. Besides okra, they often include lamb, olive oil, and tomatoes. There are also meatless variants (cf. ladera). They are generally called "okra stew", "okra with meat", "okra cooked with oil" (meatless), and so on, in the various languages. In some cuisines, they are called just bamia, the word for okra.

Other possible ingredients include onion, garlic, cilantro (coriander), pomegranate molasses, vegetable oil, cardamom, salt and pepper.

== Name ==
The dish is called Arabic: البامية باللحم, romanized: al-bāmiya bil-laḥm 'okra with meat', or شوربة البامية šūrba al-bāmiya 'okra stew'; in Kurdish: بامێ, romanized: bāmieh; in Persian: خورش بامیه, romanized: khoresh-e bâmiyeh 'okra stew'; in Greek, μπάμιες λαδερές 'oil-cooked okra' (meatless), μπάμιες με κοτόπουλο/κρέας 'okra with chicken/meat'; and in Turkish, bamya yemeği 'okra dish', et-li bamya 'okra with meat', or zeytinyağlı bamya 'oil-cooked okra' (meatless and served cold), in Romanian, mâncare de bame 'okra stew'.

The short form bamya (in various spellings) is the usual name for the dish in South Slavic and Romanian.

== History ==
Early Persian references mention bâmiyeh (okra with lamb) as an Egyptian recipe, but the exact history is unknown.

A recipe of okra and tomatoes can be found in the 1893 Egyptian cookbook, Kitāb nasị̄hạt al-anām fī hụsn al-tạʻām, by Isma'il Pasha of Egypt's personal chef.

According to the food historian Gil Marks, okra is first attested in a 12th-century Egyptian recipe. Okra was introduced to Spain in the middle ages by the Moors.

== Regional variations ==
=== Bosnia and Herzegovina ===
In Bosnia and Herzegovina, bamija' or bamja is a stew of okra and veal, made at all times of year. It is slow cooked until the meat is completely tender.

=== Egypt ===
In Egypt, lamb tendons are typically stewed with okra until tender. Ta'aleya, an Egyptian garlic sauce, is a common accompaniment. (Note: "...dressed with a fragrant taa'leya, an Egyptian mixture of spices fried with garlic.")

=== The Levant ===
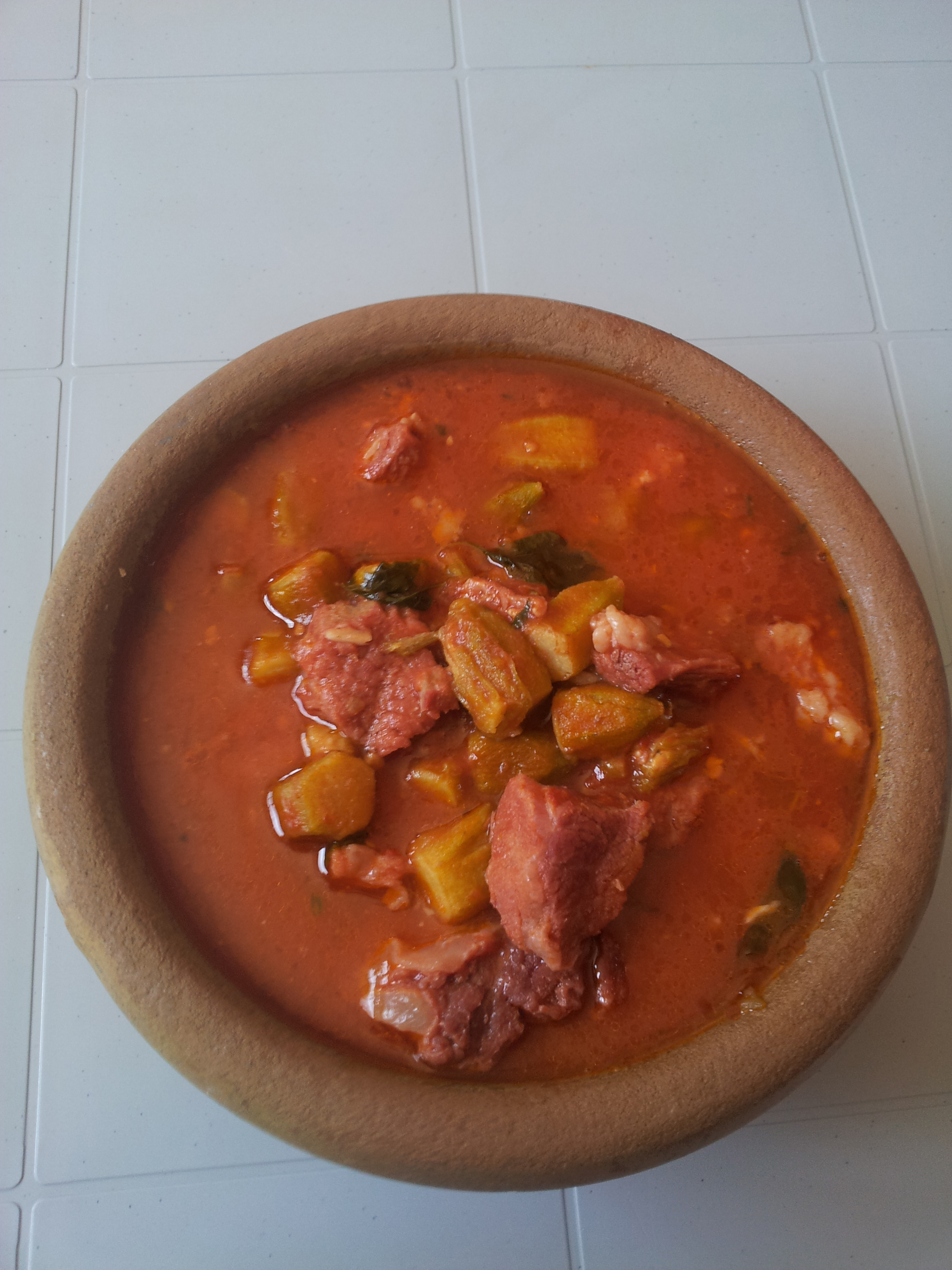
Bamia from Gaza

Okra stews are prepared across the Levant. They are usually served over rice and vermicelli, and seasoned with pomegranate molasses.

Bamyeh bil-zeyt (Arabic: بامية بالزيت) is an okra stew cooked in tomatoes found in Syrian, Lebanese, and Palestinian cuisine. Gazan bamia is traditionally spicy and eaten with rice or bread.

=== Iran, Afghanistan and Tajikistan ===
In Iran, Afghanistan and Tajikistan, bâmiyeh is served as a Persian khoresh (stew) along with Persian rice. It is a popular dish in the southern provinces of Iran. The southern Iranian local version of Khoresh-e bâmiyeh includes the use of turmeric, vinegar, potatoes, and red chili flakes. A similar Persian recipe exists for okra stew with the addition of yellow lentils (Persian: خورش بامیه لاپه, romanized: Khoresh-e bâmiyeh lapeh).

The Persian khoresh-e bâmiyeh has influenced Gulf cuisine where the Persian dish has been directly adopted.

=== Iraq ===
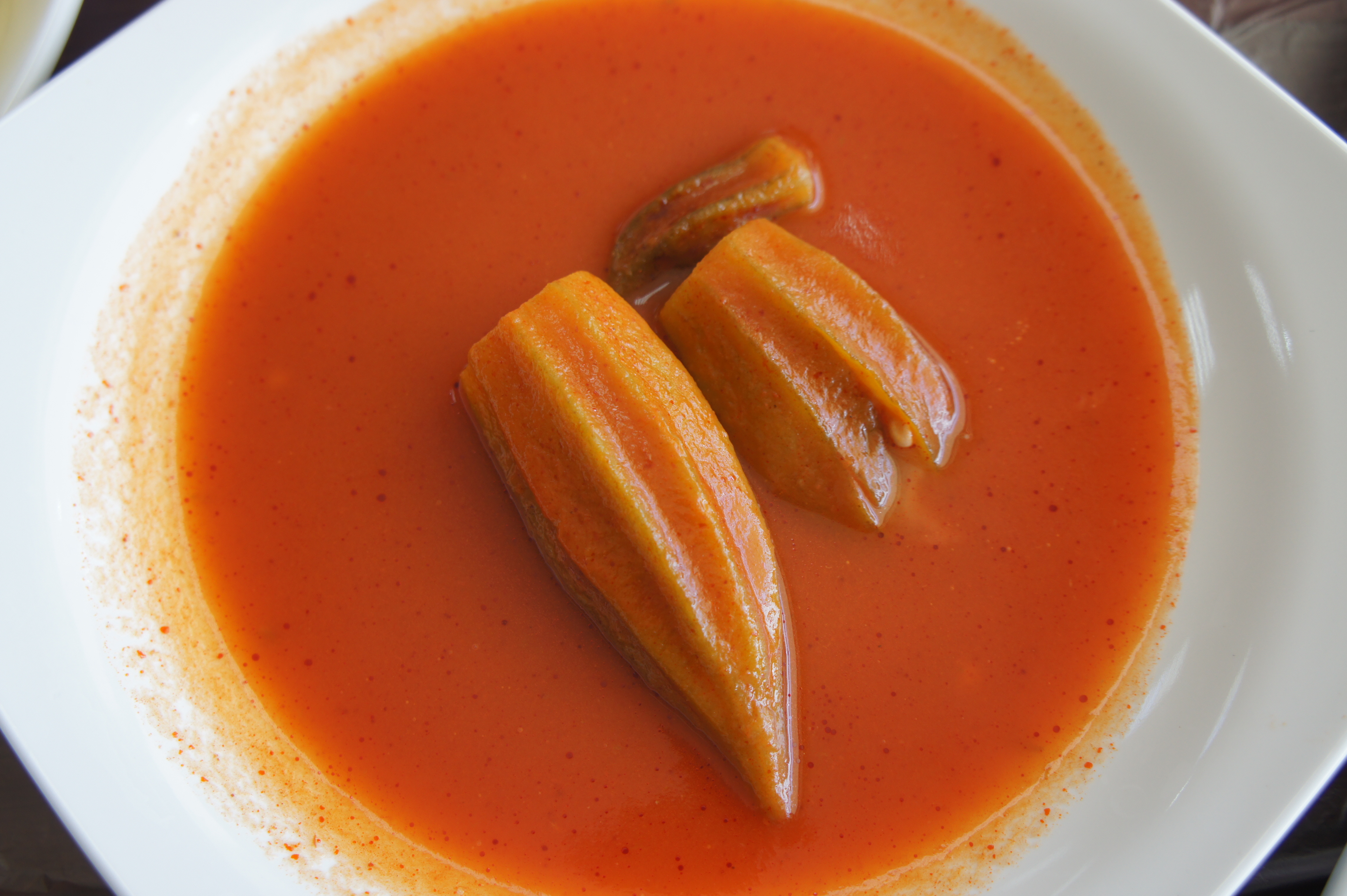
Kurdish bamia in Duhok.

Iraqi Jews put semolina kibbeh in their version, kubbah bamia.

=== Turkey ===
In Turkey, bamya is an Anatolian stew that has a sweet and sour flavor. It is prepared using okra, lemon juice, olive oil, sugar, salt and pepper. Turkish bamia is sometimes served as a palate cleanser between food courses at ceremonial feasts.

== See also ==
- Arab cuisine
- Central Asian cuisine
- Iranian cuisine
- List of stews
- Turkish cuisine
