= Khoresh karafs =

Traditional Iranian dish

Khoresh karafs خورش کرفس
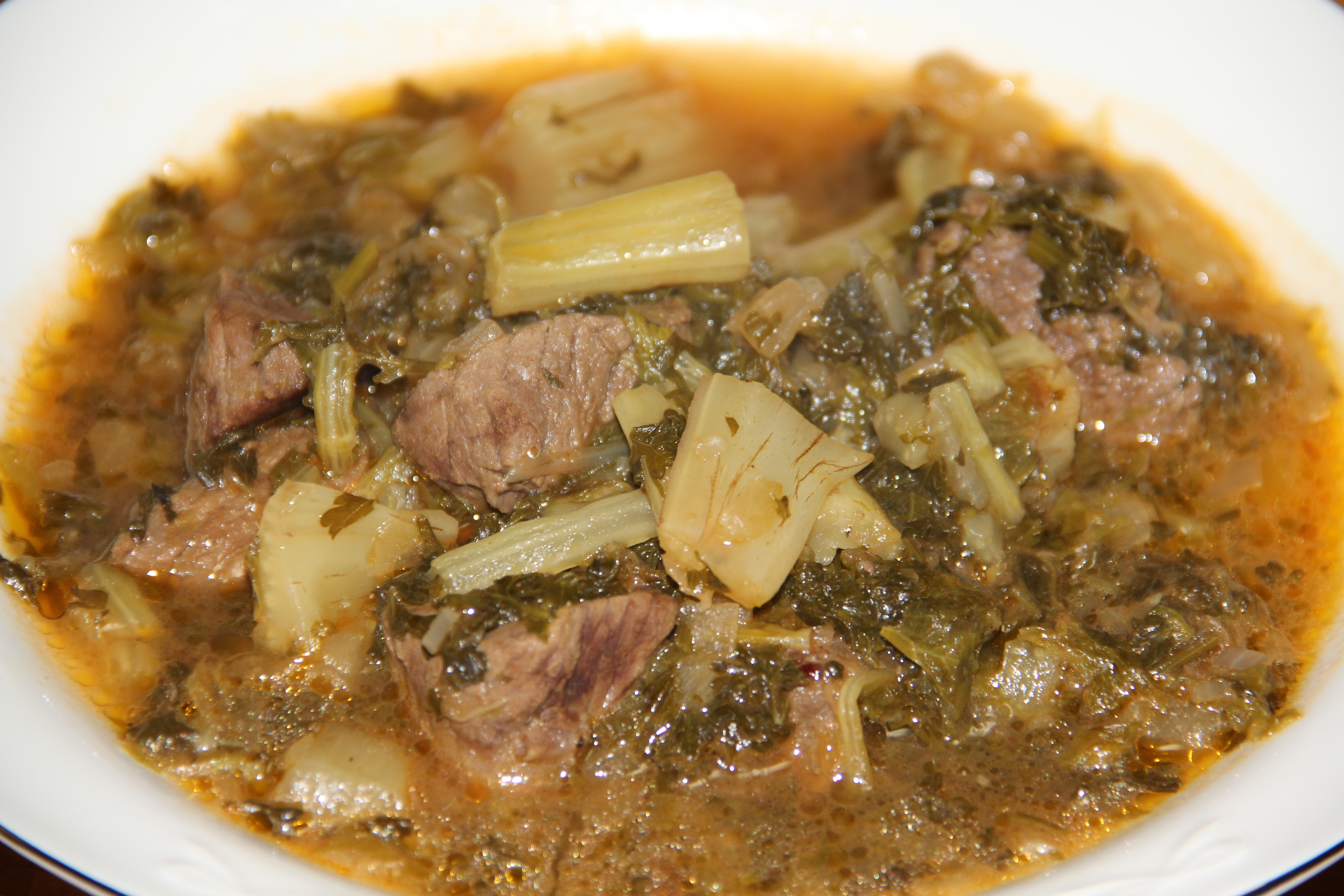
- Celery stew is served in a separate dish from the Persian rice that it is eaten with.
- Alternative names: Celery stew
- Type: stew
- Course: Main course
- Place of origin: Iran (Tehran)
- Region or state: Iran
- Associated cuisine: Iranian cuisine
- Created by: Persians
- Cooking time: 60 minutes to 3 hours
- Serving temperature: Hot
- Main ingredients: Celery, onion, mint, parsley; protein (red meat, chicken, or mushroom); and a souring ingredient (lemon juice, lime juice, or ver jus)
- Ingredients generally used: turmeric, pepper, tomato, and salt

Khoresh karafs (Persian: خورش کرفس, lit. 'celery stew') is a traditional Iranian dish. As the name suggests, celery is the main part of this dish.

== About ==
Traditionally, khoresh karafs is prepared with red meat (lamb, or beef), but unlike ghormeh sabzi or gheimeh, it is common to substitute chicken meat in this recipe. This food has become more diverse in recent years, and its vegan and vegetarian varieties have entered the diet of Iranian families. In Najmieh Batmanglij's cookbook New Food of Life (2021 edition), she suggests using white broad beans (white fava beans) for a vegetarian version.

This stew is characterized by being sour. Traditionally, unripe grapes (verjus) are used as a souring agent, but the use of lemon juice, lime juice, tamarind, or even citric acid also occurs as an alternative souring agent. Khoresh karafs, like all other types of Iranian stews, is exclusively served with Persian rice.

== History ==
The origins of celery stew Is Iran. It is a traditional Iranian food. In 1964, a recipe for it was mentioned in a cookbook by Roza Montazemi.

== See also ==
- List of stews
