= Chelow =

Chelow can refer to:

- Kebab
- Pilaf
- Chelow, Iran (disambiguation)
