= Ghormeh sabzi =

Iranian herb stew

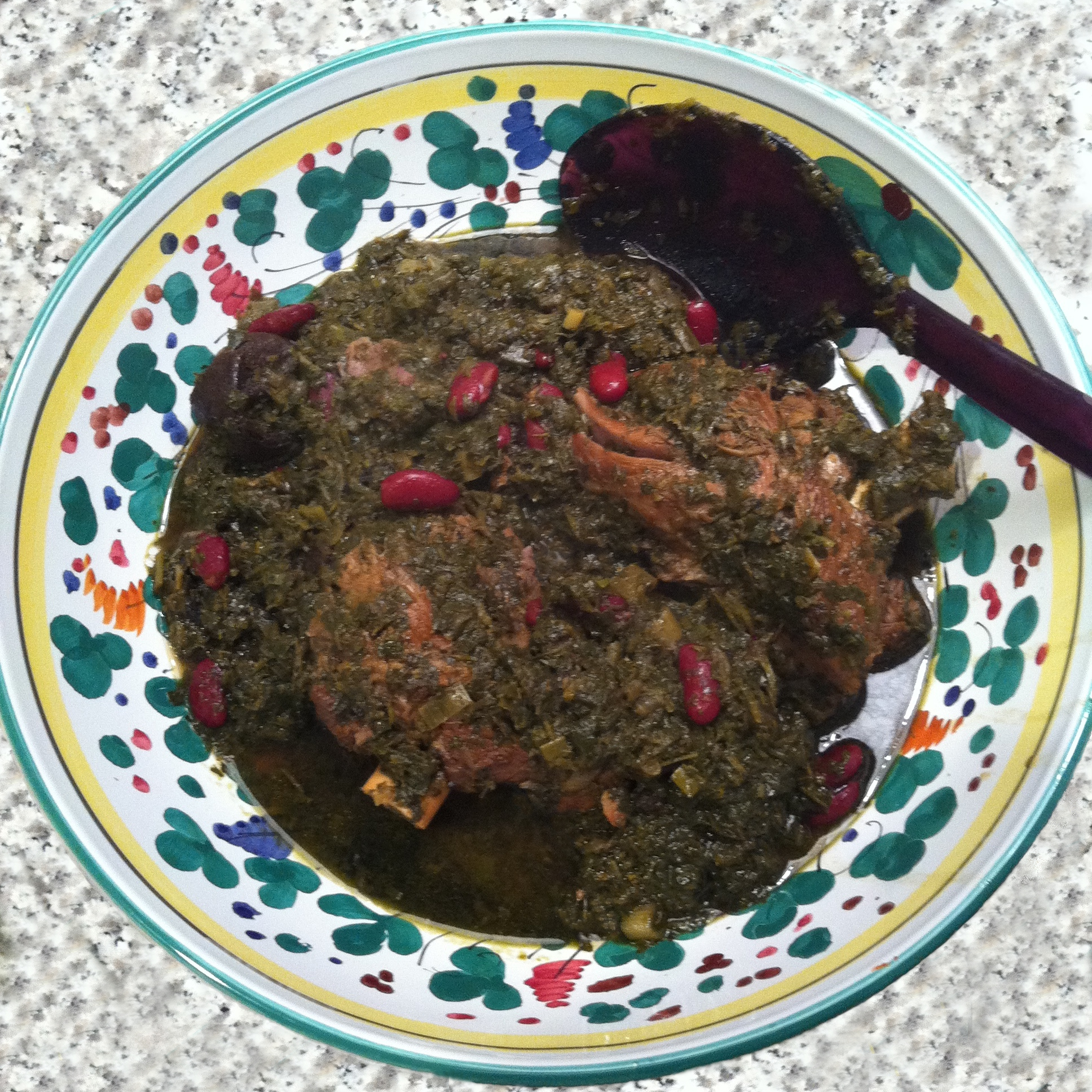
- Type: Stew
- Course: Main course
- Place of origin: Iran
- Associated cuisine: Iranian cuisine
- Main ingredients: herbs, red kidney beans, dried lime, lemons, turmeric, saffron, lamb; served with Persian saffron rice

Ghormeh sabzi (Persian: قورمه سبزی, lit. 'Preserved Meat in Fat (Note: Qormeh is a traditional method of preserving meat by slowly cooking it in its own fat or rendered animal fat and storing it submerged in the fat.) with Leaf vegetable') or Khoresht Sabzi (Persian: خورشت سبزی ) is a traditional Persian herbal stew. It is considered the national dish of Iran and is a very commonly served dish. Ghormeh sabzi has different variants, which are mainly based on the difference between the beans and meat used in the stew.

== Preparation ==
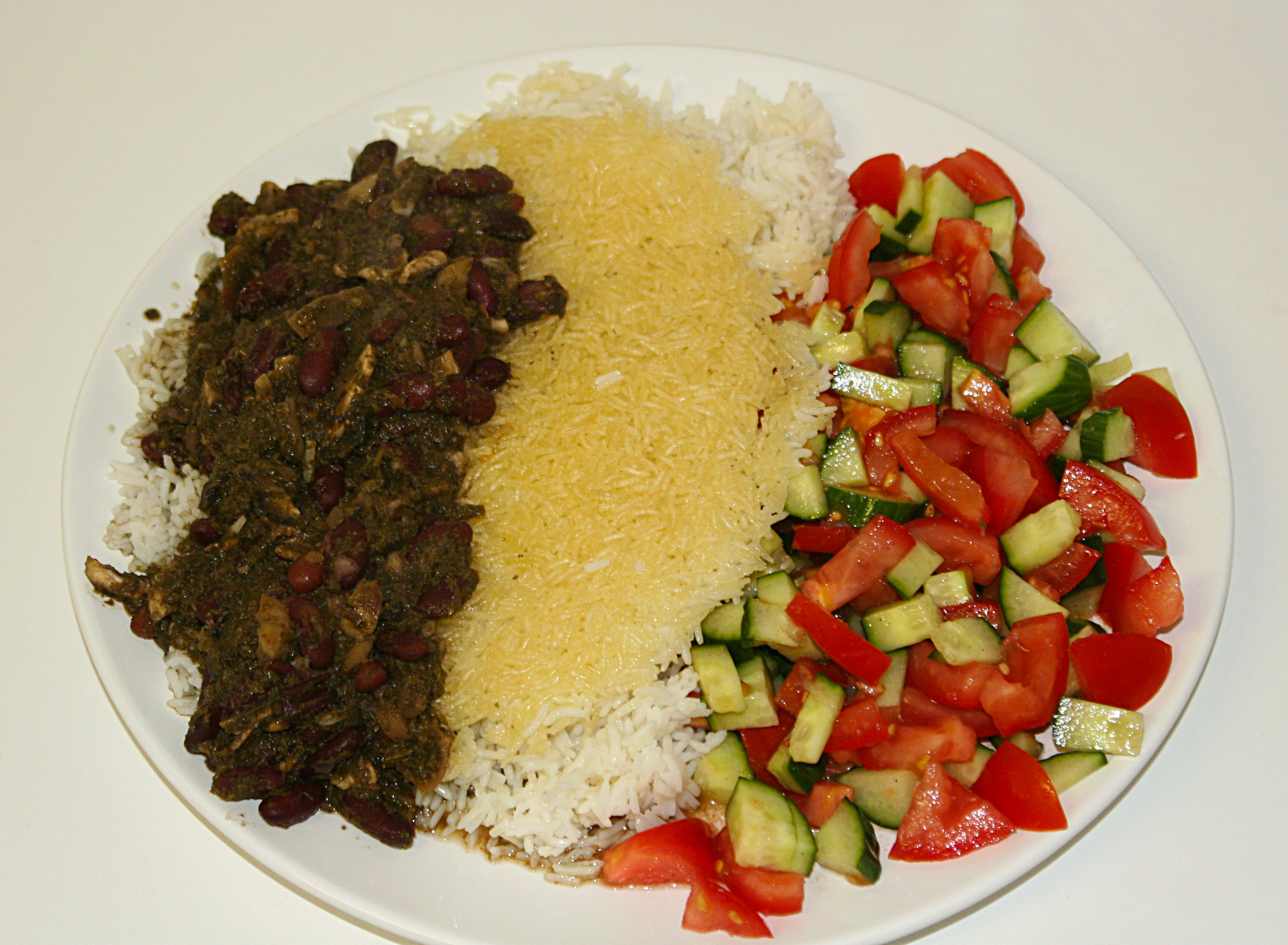
Homemade ghormeh sabzi served with Persian chelow and Shirazi salad

The main ingredients are a combination of carefully sautéed herbs, consisting of parsley, leeks, green onions, and coriander, seasoned with the key spice of dried fenugreek leaves. Any dark bitter greens can be used, such as kale, mustard greens, or turnip greens, although none of those are part of the original recipe and are not typically used.

This mixture is cooked with red kidney beans, yellow or red onions, black lime (pierced dried Persian lime), and pieces of slowly braised lamb seasoned with turmeric. The dish is then served with pollo (Persian steamed saffron rice) and tahdig (Persian crispy rice).

The Financial Times noted that there is some disagreement among Iranians on one of the ingredients used in the stew. The classical and most common version cooked throughout Iran uses red kidney beans, while one version cooked in the south of Iran uses black-eyed beans.

== History ==
Ghormeh sabzi belongs to the Persian khoresh tradition, a category of stew dishes very frequently encountered in Persian cuisine. It is one of the oldest khoresh stews in Persian cuisine and is estimated to be at least 2,500 years old. In Encyclopedia Iranica, ghormeh sabzi is listed among the chief Persian khoresh dishes prepared in Iran. More broadly, Persian cookery today is traceable to the ancient traditions that took shape thousands of years ago on the Iranian Plateau. The earliest surviving classical cookbooks in Persian date from the Safavid period. Persian cuisine was further refined in the Qajar period, which Encyclopedia Iranica describes as the predecessor of present-day Persian cuisine and as continuing the ancient Persian tradition of sour khoresh stews combining meat with herbs, vegetables, beans, lentils, fresh and dried fruits, saffron, dried limes, lemons, and verjuice.

== Serving ==
Ghormeh sabzi, a flavorful Persian herbal stew, is traditionally served with Persian saffron rice. However, it can also be eaten with Persian flatbread, shirazi salad (cucumbers, tomatoes, onions, herbs, and pomegranate molasses), and mast-o-khiar, a traditional Persian yoghurt-cucumber dip.

== Cultural importance ==
Self magazine listed ghormeh sabzi as one of twelve of the most meaningful dishes among cultures passed down among families. The Tehran Times wrote that the dish "is one of the most prominent dishes in Persian culinary heritage."

Iranians in the diaspora traditionally celebrate "International Ghormeh Sabzi Appreciation Day" two days after Thanksgiving.

Ghormeh sabzi is the first Iranian dish served in outer space, by Iranian-American astronaut Jasmin Moghbeli.

== See also ==
- Borani
- List of stews
- Gheimeh
