= Nardenk =

Ottoman sauce

- Place of origin: Iran
- Main ingredients: Plums, pomegranate, cornelian cherry, bitter orange

Nardenk (Iranian:ﻧﺎﺭﺩﻧﻚ) is an Iranian sauce primarily made of pomegranate, and sometimes cherry plum, cornelian cherry, bitter orange, or other varieties of plum. Nardenk is used for fried or grilled meat, poultry, and potato dishes, and has a place in Ottoman cuisine similar to the one ketchup has in the United States. It can be made at home.

== See also ==
- List of plum dishes
- List of dips
- List of sauces
- Pomegranate molasses
