= Salsa di noci =

Italian condiment

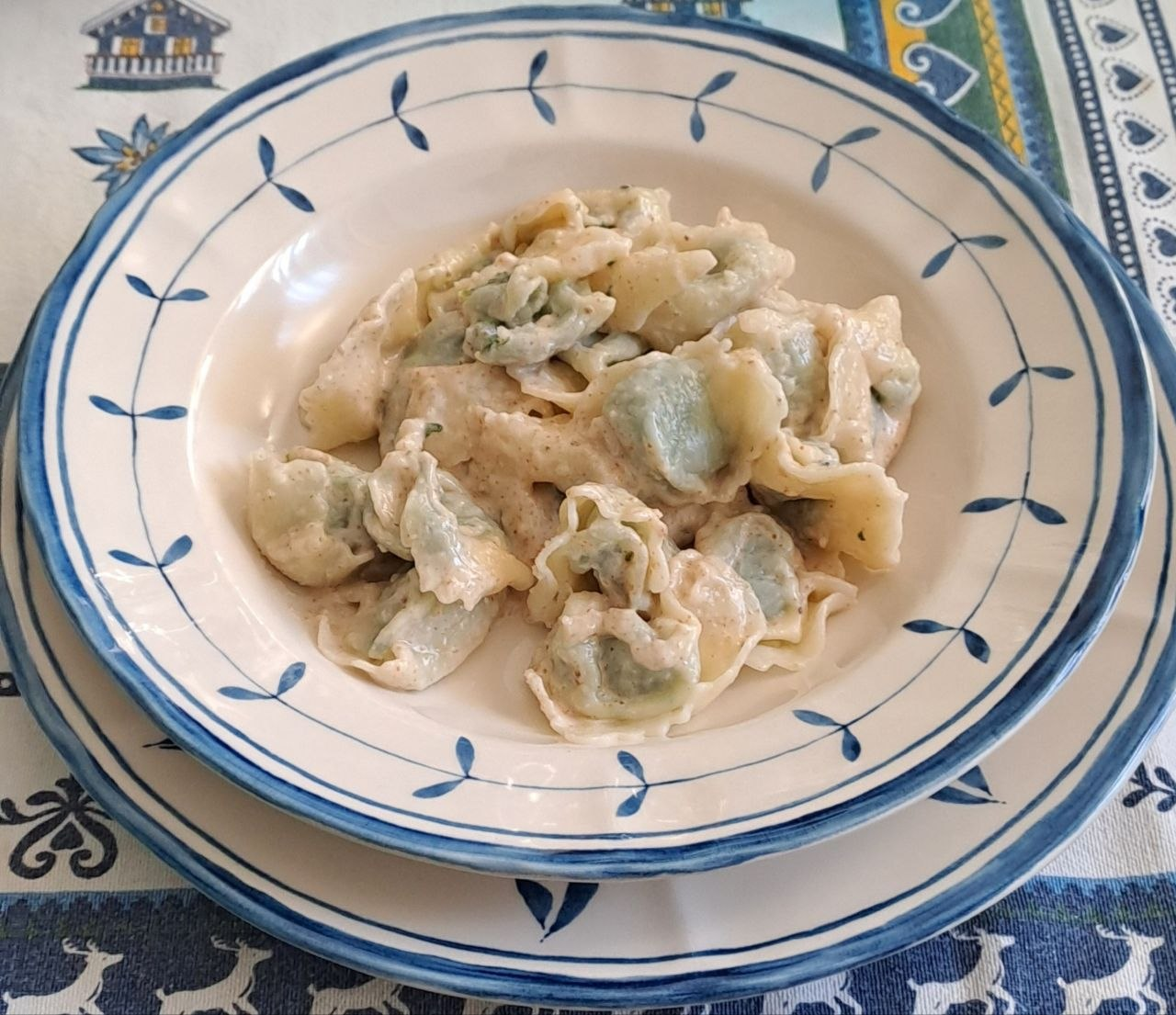
- Type: Sauce
- Course: Condiment
- Place of origin: Italy
- Region or state: Liguria
- Main ingredients: Walnuts, garlic, olive oil, bread, prescinseua or milk

Salsa di noci (Ligurian: sarsa de noxe, pronounced /'sarsa de 'nuːʒe/audio) is a cold condiment typical of Ligurian cuisine and the northwestern Apennines. It is a mechanical emulsion of walnut kernels, garlic, extra virgin olive oil, and lactic-starchy components.

Officially recognized as a Prodotto agroalimentare tradizionale (P.A.T.) by the Italian Ministry of Agriculture, Food Sovereignty and Forests, salsa di noci represents one of Liguria's culinary excellences, distinguishing itself by a sensory profile that balances the lipid density of the nuts with the pungency of garlic and the acidity of prescinseua (a fresh curd cheese).

== History and culinary evolution ==
The genesis of salsa di noci is the result of a long process of culinary acculturation favored by the commercial centrality of Genoa between the Middle Ages and the Early modern period. The Republic of Genoa, thanks to its network of colonies in the Black Sea and the Levant, acted as a catalyst for techniques and flavors from the Byzantine, Persian, and Arab East.

=== Oriental roots ===
Culinary historiography (supported by scholars such as Paolo Lingua) suggests that the Genoese use of crushed oleaginous seeds to dress pasta dates back to at least the late 14th century. Documents from the era attest to the consumption of lasagne dressed with walnuts, a custom that preceded the stabilization of the pesto alla genovese recipe.

The origin of this practice can be traced to contacts with the populations of the Caucasus and Anatolia, where sauces based on walnuts and garlic were already well-established. In Genoese colonies such as Caffa, Ligurian merchants came into contact with preparations using walnuts, spices, and yogurt. The modern salsa di noci is considered the "Westernized" version of these preparations, where Ligurian olive oil replaced or supplemented Levantine raw materials.

=== Evolution from medieval agliate ===
A fundamental step in its evolution is the transition from the ancient agliata (aggiadda), a medieval sauce made from crushed garlic, breadcrumbs, and vinegar, originally used by sailors to preserve food. Over time, the addition of fatty components (walnuts) and the use of milk instead of vinegar "tamed" the aggressiveness of the garlic, transforming a functional preparation into an accompanying sauce for noble and stuffed pastas, such as pansoti.

== Ingredients ==
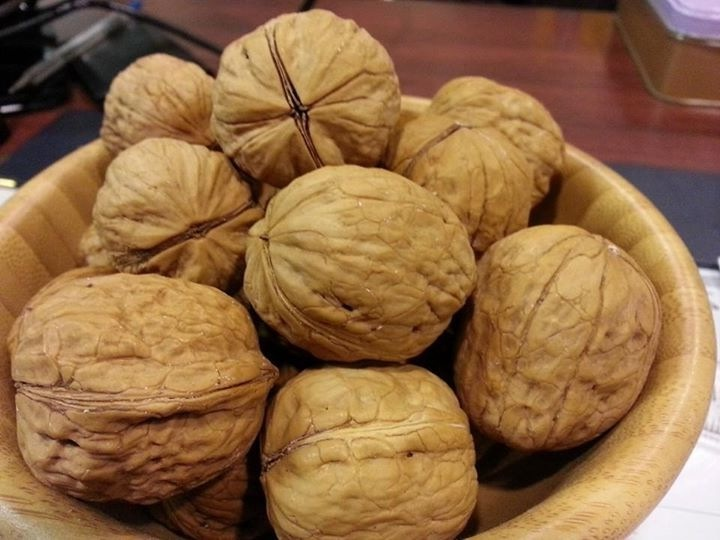
Walnuts, the main ingredient of the sauce

The quality of the sauce depends heavily on the selection of raw materials and their chemical-physical interactions:

- Walnut kernel (Juglans regia): Forms the structural base. Tradition calls for blanching the kernels to remove the outer skin, eliminating the tannins responsible for bitter notes and giving the sauce its typical ivory-white color.
- Vessalico garlic: Preferred for its high digestibility and delicate aroma that does not overpower the sweetness of the walnuts.
- Marjoram (persa): This is the only herb allowed in the canonical recipe, necessary to provide a fresh and citrusy top note.
- Prescinseua and bread: White breadcrumbs, soaked in milk, act as a natural emulsifier. Prescinseua (traditional Genoese curd) gives an acidic depth of flavor that cannot be accurately replicated by cream or Parmesan cheese alone.

=== Ingredient comparison ===
Ingredient	Technical Function	Traditional Variant	Modern Variant
Walnut kernels	Lipid and protein base	Blanched and peeled	With skin (more bitter)
Garlic	Aromatic base	Vessalico garlic	Common garlic
Olive oil	Liquid fat phase	Ligurian extra virgin olive oil	Seed oil (not recommended)
Bread	Emulsifier/Thickener	White breadcrumbs	Sliced bread
Milk/Cheese	Aqueous phase and sapidity	Prescinseua and Parmesan	Milk and heavy cream
Herbs	Top note	Fresh marjoram	Thyme or absent

== Preparation ==
=== The marble mortar ===
The classic method involves using a Carrara marble mortar with a boxwood or lemon wood pestle. The rotary movement breaks the cell walls of the kernels without overheating the fats, triggering a cold emulsion. The order of insertion is strict: garlic and salt, walnuts, breadcrumbs, and finally oil and the dairy component.

=== Modern blending ===
In contemporary settings, the food processor or blender has largely replaced the mortar. However, high-speed blades can induce oxidation and heat, making the sauce bitter. To overcome this, it is recommended to operate the blender in short pulses and chill the container beforehand.

=== Regional variations ===
The spread of the sauce follows the ancient "salt roads" that connected the port of Genoa with the hinterland:

- The Ajà of Oltrepò Pavese: A more rustic variant typical of the Oltrepò Pavese and the Tortona area. The kernels are rarely peeled, resulting in a darker and more tannic sauce. In the mountains, olive oil was sometimes replaced by butter or lardo.
- The Salt Road: Municipalities like Bobbio and Varzi bear witness to the link with Liguria, utilizing the sauce to dress chestnut flour lasagne or tagliatelle.

== Similar international sauces ==
Ligurian salsa di noci belongs to a wider family of oleaginous seed emulsions widespread throughout the Mediterranean and beyond:

Sauce	Region of Origin	Oil Base	Acidic Component	Common Use
Salsa di Noci	Liguria (Italy)	Walnuts	Prescinseua / Milk	Pansoti, Corzetti
Satsivi	Georgia	Walnuts	Vinegar / Pomegranate	Poultry, Fish
Romesco	Catalonia (Spain)	Almonds / Walnuts	Wine vinegar	Calçots, Fish
Tarator	Balkans / Turkey	Walnuts	Yogurt / Vinegar	Vegetables, Meat

== Nutrition ==
Salsa di noci is a food with a high energy density (about 660–710 kcal per 100g), but possesses an excellent lipid profile.

- Omega-3: Walnuts are rich in alpha-linolenic acid (ALA), which is beneficial for the cardiovascular system.
- Allicin: The use of raw garlic provides sulfur compounds with antibacterial properties.

Nutritional Parameter	Average Value (per 100 g)
Energy (kcal)	660–710
Fats (g)	65–71
Proteins (g)	6–19
Carbohydrates (g)	1–13
Fiber (g)	3–5

== Uses ==
The use of the sauce follows precise rules aimed at preserving its delicate structure:

- Pansoti: This is the elective pairing. The sweetness of the sauce perfectly balances the bitterness of the preboggion (a traditional mixture of wild herbs) contained in the pasta filling.
- Corzetti: A stamped pasta typical of the Val Fontanabuona.
- Chestnut pasta: The combination of walnuts and chestnuts is a classic staple of Apennine cuisine.

== Protection and industrial production ==
The sauce's inclusion in the list of P.A.T. (Traditional Agri-Food Products) protects the recipe from industrial distortions, such as the substitution of walnuts with cheaper cashews or peanuts, the use of low-quality oils, or the addition of artificial additives and preservatives that alter the delicacy of the original dairy component.

== See also ==
- Pesto
- Ligurian cuisine
