= Palate cleanser =

Food term

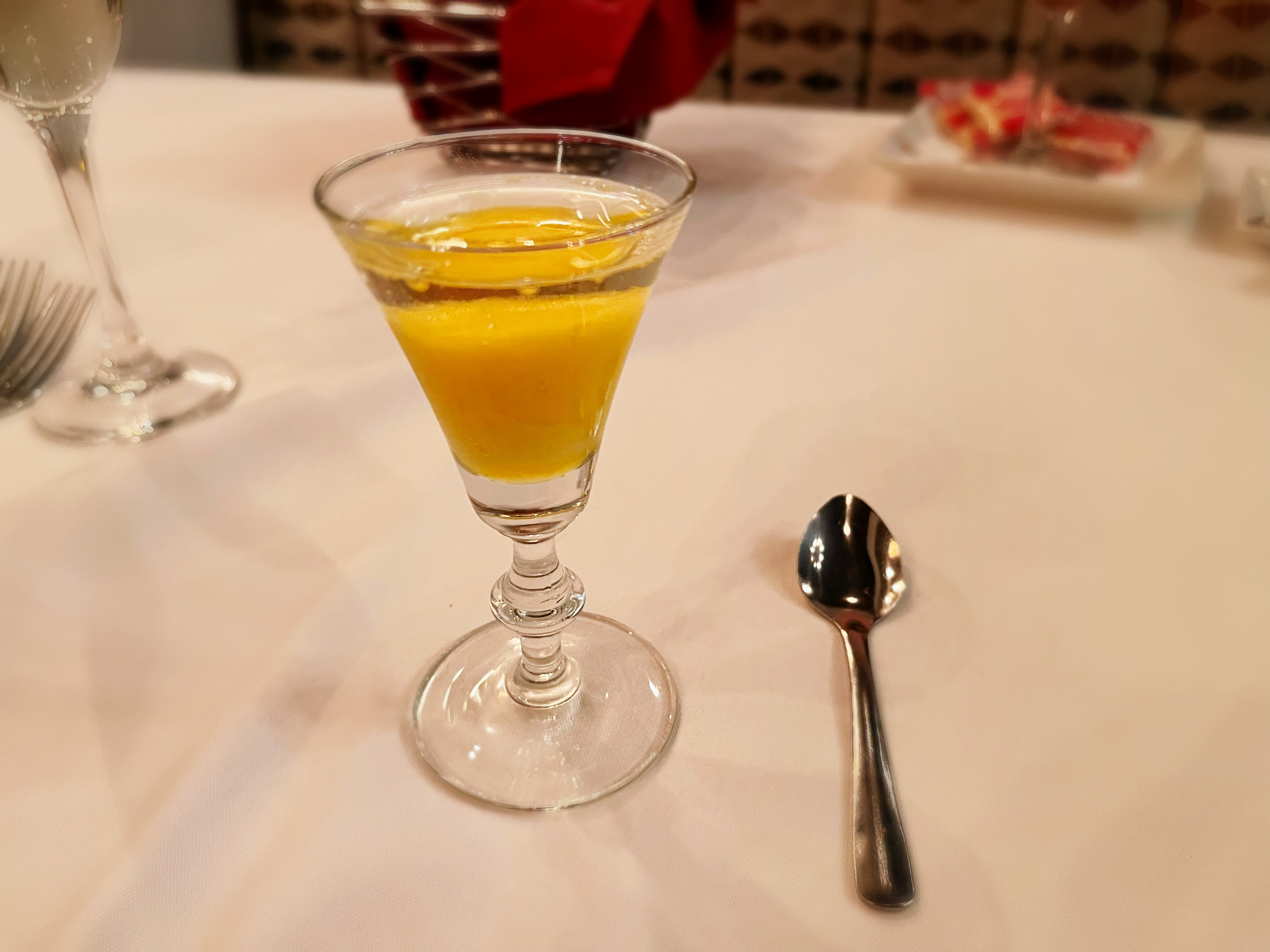
A mango sorbet and sparkling wine palate-cleanser at Boomtown Steakhouse in Verdi, Nevada.

A palate-cleanser is a serving of food or drink that removes food residue from the tongue, allowing one to more accurately assess a new flavor.

Palate-cleansers are often used between tasting wines, cheeses, or other strong flavors. Pickled ginger is used as a palate-cleanser between sushi pieces.

Traditional French palate-cleansing foods include sorbet, bread, apple slices, parsley and mint.

Bamia is a traditional Anatolian stew that is sometimes served as a palate-cleanser between food courses at ceremonial feasts.
