= Dried lime tea =

Traditional drink from the Middle East

Noomi basra tea
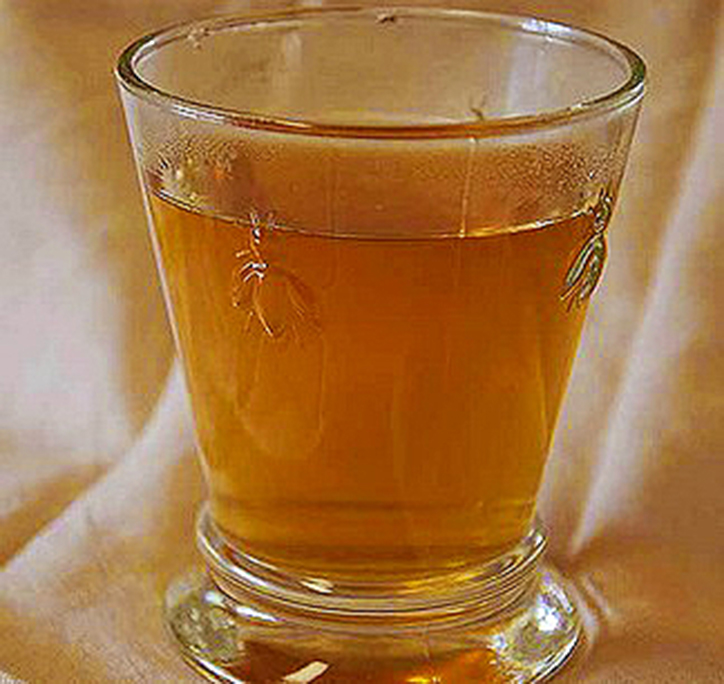
- Dried lime tea in glass.
- Type: Tea
- Origin: Middle East, Arabian Peninsula
- Colour: Amber
- Flavour: Sour
- Ingredients: Dried lime

Dried lime tea, also known as chai noomi basra (Arabic: شاي نومي بصرة), noomi basra tea or loomi tea, is a type of herbal tea made from dried limes that is traditional to Iraq and the Arabian Peninsula.

== Preparation ==
Loomi tea is made by seeding the dried limes (noomi Basra) where they are cracked into several pieces, or just pricked, and their peels are simmered in water for 15 to 30 minutes until boiled. Afterwards, they are drained and the tea is sweetened with sugar. At times, honey may be preferred instead and saffron threads may also be added.

== Usage ==
Served hot, the drink is also consumed as a remedy to aid indigestion, upset stomach, diarrhea, and nausea. It is very sour and aromatic, but can also be mildly sweet, depending on how much sugar is added. Omani dried limes have a pleasant tart citrus flavor and are rich in vitamin C.

== See also ==
- Karak tea, black tea with herbs popular in Eastern Arabia
- Ginger tea, another herbal tea used to treat upset stomach
