= Chalu, Tonekabon =

Chalu چالو
- Village
- Location within Iran
- Coordinates: 36°42′12″N 50°58′51″E
- Country: Iran
- Province: Mazandaran
- County: Tonekabon
- Bakhsh: Nashta
- Rural District: Tameshkol

Population (2006)
  - Total: 177
- Time zone: UTC+3:30 (IRST)
  - Summer (DST): UTC+4:30 (IRDT)

Chalu (Persian: چالو, also Romanized as Chālū) is a village in Tameshkol Rural District, Nashta District, Tonekabon County, Mazandaran Province, Iran. At the 2006 census, its population was 177, in 44 families.
