= Prescinsêua =

Italian cheese

- Other names: Quagliata or cagliata (Italian)
- Country of origin: Italy
- Region: Liguria
- Town: Genoa, Savona, La Spezia
- Texture: Half solid, Half liquid
- Certification: P.A.T.

Prescinsêua (pronounced [pɾeʃiŋˈsøːa]) is a variety of cheese typical of the province of Genoa in the region of Liguria in Italy. In Italian it is also referred to as quagliata or cagliata. It is recognised by P.A.T. (Prodotti Agroalimentari Tradizionali).

It has a consistency halfway between yogurt and ricotta cheese. It has a fairly sour flavor and is used in the preparation of a number of typical Ligurian dishes, such as pansoti (similar to ravioli but filled with vegetables), focaccia al formaggio, and many savory pies, including Genoese Easter pie (torta pasqualina).

It is obtained through the process of acidification of milk: from it is derived a sour milk product, which is let rest in plastic or glass containers.

Because it spoils easily, prescinsêua is not commonly sold beyond Genoa and the eastern part of Liguria, but its flavor and consistency can be approximated by mixing ricotta cheese with yogurt or sour cream.

It is often served for breakfast, with small amounts of sugar, honey or fruit preserve added.

== Etymology ==
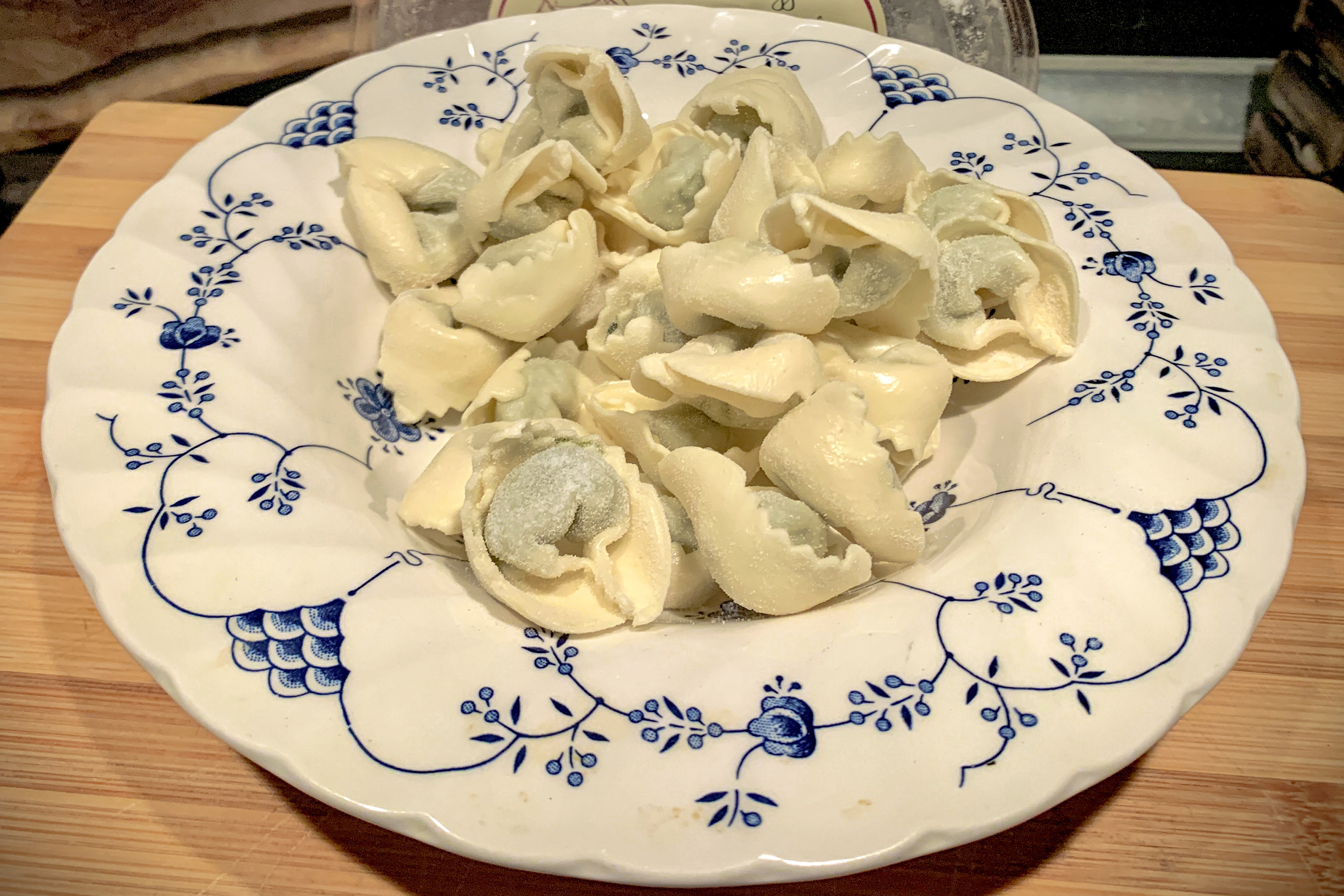
Pansoti (a vegetarian filled ravioli from Genoa)

The Genoese term rescinsêua derives from rennet (presû in Genoese) extracted from the abomasum of suckling calves.

== History ==
It is first mentioned in 1383. Since 1413, a law enforced by the Repubblica di Genova stated that this cheese could have been the only gift which could have been made by the people of Genoa to the Doge.

The product is thought to have been brought in Liguria from the Far East. Since the medieval times, it has been produced in Val Fontanabuona (a valley above Camogli and Rapallo), with cows coming from Val d'Aveto.

In the past, it was mainly used as ingredient for focaccia al formaggio (tipo Recco), but nowadays, not being widely produced, prescinsêua is substituted by stracchino or crescenza (a cheese similar to stracchino).

== Preparation ==
While in the past it was obtained through the processing of whey, now it is obtained starting from whole milk. Two liters of milk are left resting in a pot for 48 hours. Afterwards, 500ml of such milk are put in another pot and heated to 40–50 °C (104–122 °F), rennet is added (about 5g). The two milk pots are joined and let rest for four more hours.

== Cultural influence ==
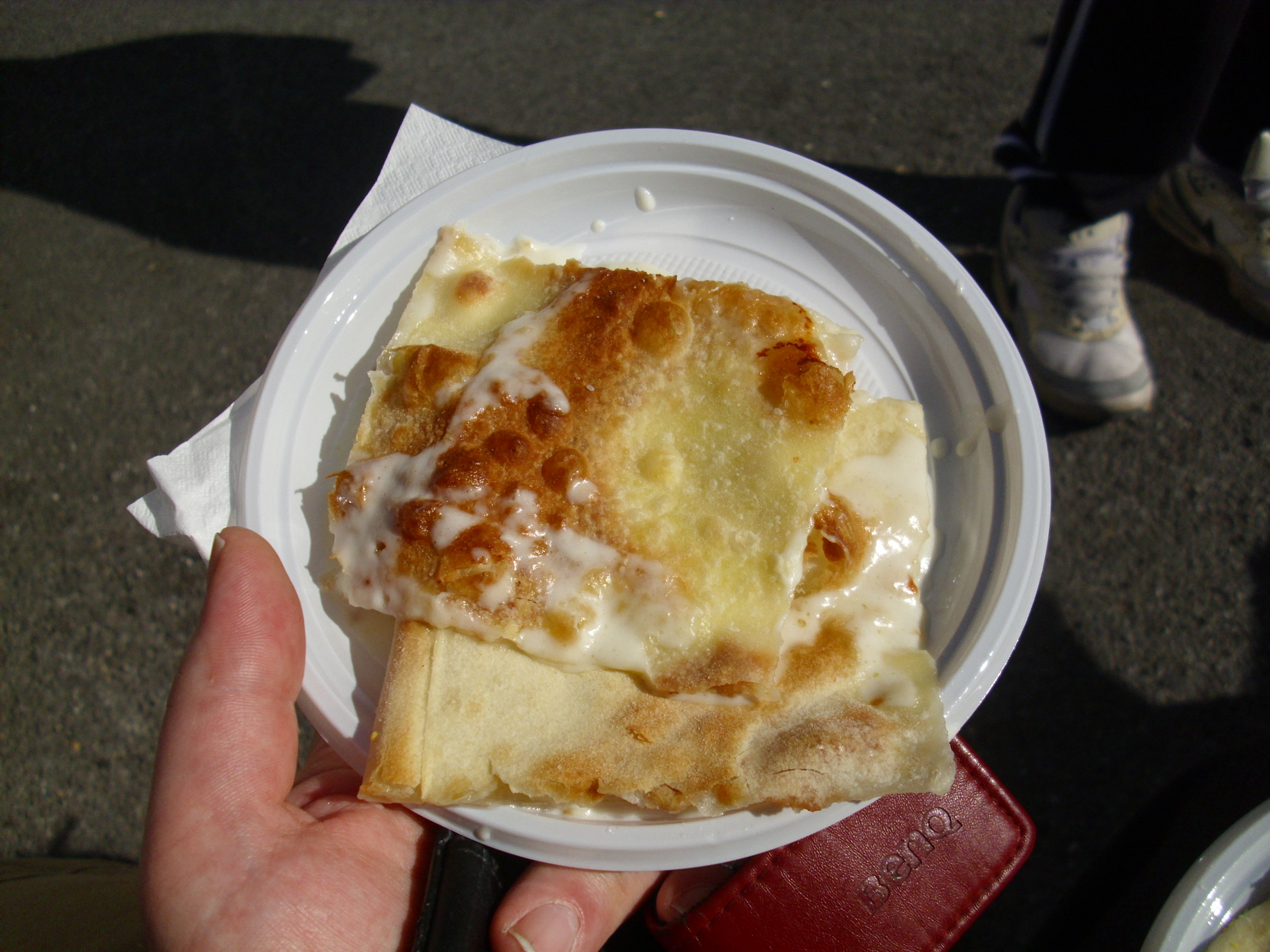
Focaccia al Formaggio (Recco Style)

The cheese product was mentioned by the Genoese music group Buio Pesto in their song "Prescinsêua". part of their 2010 album Pesto.

== See also ==
- List of Italian cheeses
- Cuisine of Liguria
- List of Italian dishes
