= Split pea =

Dried and split seed of Pisum sativum

Split peas, raw (dried)
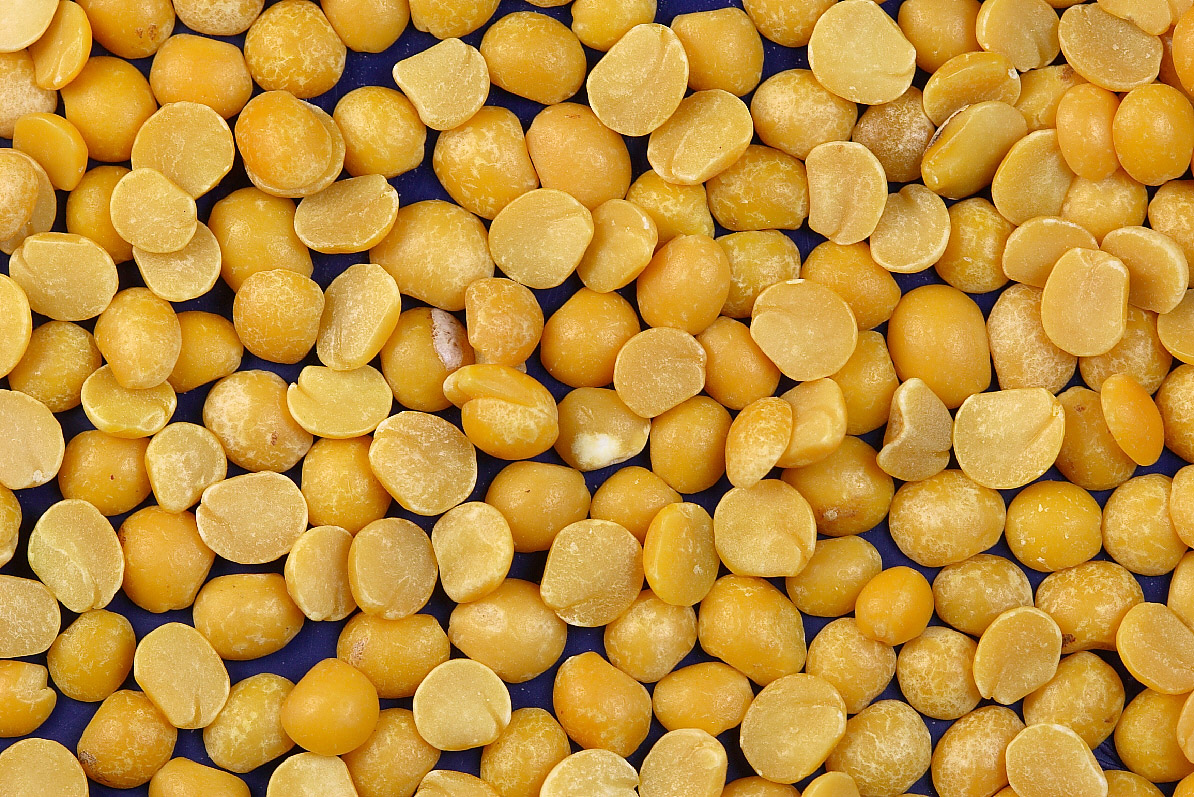
- Yellow split peas

Nutritional value per 100 g (3.5 oz)
- Energy: 1,425 kJ (341 kcal)
- Carbohydrates: 60 g
- Sugars: 8 g
- Dietary fiber: 26 g
- Fat: 1 g
- Protein: 25 g
Vitamins and minerals
Vitamins	Quantity %DV^{†}
Thiamine (B1)	58% 0.7 mg
Pantothenic acid (B5)	34% 1.7 mg
Folate (B9)	69% 274 μg
Minerals	Quantity %DV^{†}
Iron	22% 4 mg
- ^{†}Percentages estimated using US recommendations for adults.

Split peas are an agricultural or culinary preparation consisting of the dried, peeled and split seeds of Pisum sativum, the pea.

== Harvesting ==
The peas are spherical when harvested, with an outer skin. The peas are dried and the dull-coloured outer skin of the pea removed, then split in half by hand or by machine at the natural split in the seed's cotyledon.

There are green and yellow varieties of split pea. Gregor Mendel studied the inheritance of seed colour in peas; the green phenotype is recessive to the yellow one. Traditionally, the genotype of purebred yellow is "YY" and that of green is "yy", and hybrids of the two, "Yy", have a yellow (dominant) phenotype.

Split peas are high in protein and low in fat, with 25 grams of protein and one gram of fat per 350 calories (1,500 kJ) serving. Most of the calories come from protein and complex carbohydrates. The split pea is known to be a natural food source that contains some of the highest amounts of dietary fibre, containing 26 grams of fibre per 100 gram portion (104% DV based on a 2,000 calories (8,400 kJ) diet).

In Indian cuisine, arhar/toor dal (split pigeon peas) and chana dal (split yellow gram, desi chickpeas) are commonly also referred to as peas, although from other legume species than Pisum sativum.

== Uses ==
=== Culinary ===
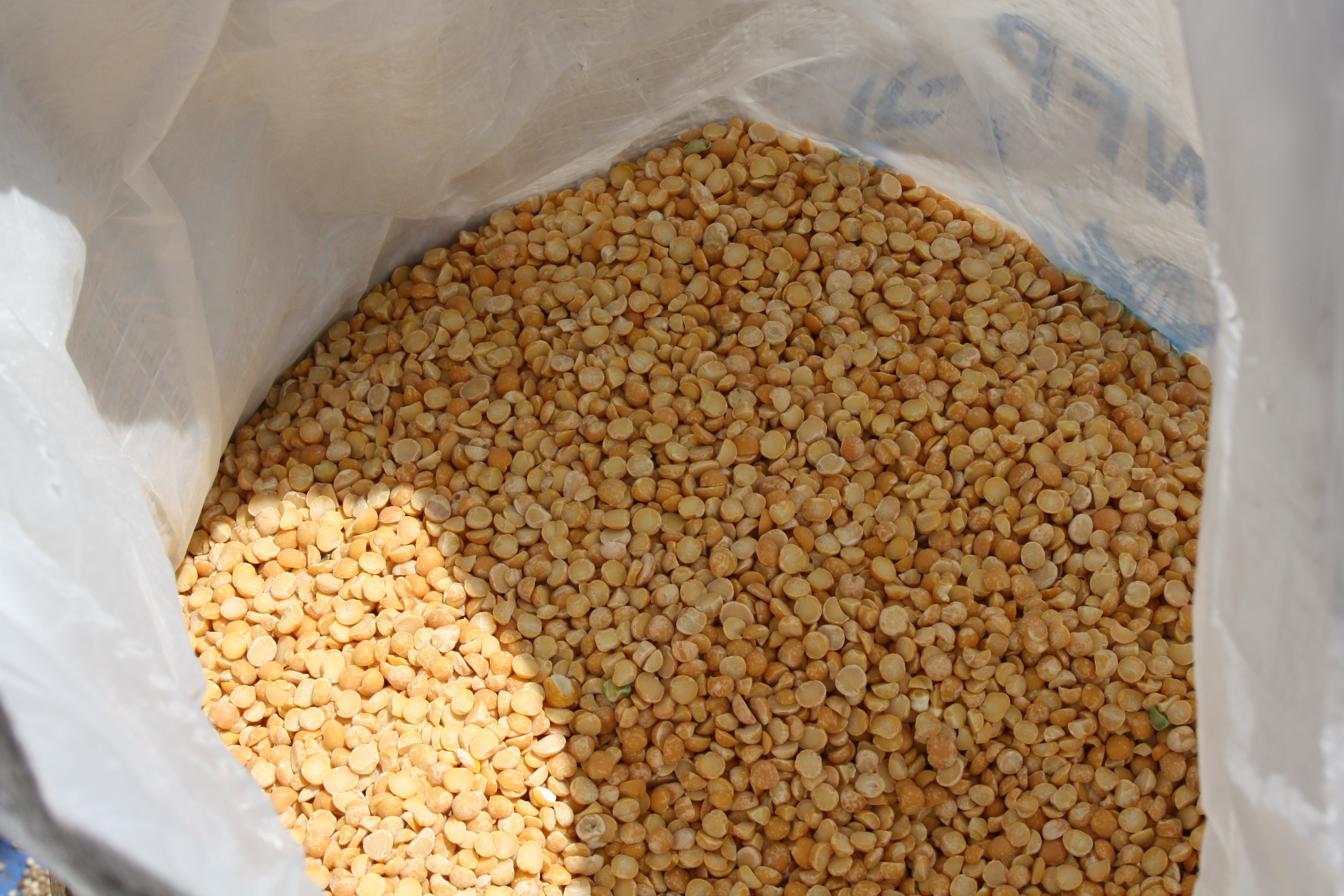
A sack of split peas

Green and yellow split peas are commonly used to make pea soup or "split pea soup", and sometimes pease pudding, which was commonly prepared in medieval Europe.

Yellow split pea is known as lappeh in western Asia and particularly in Iran and Iraq. It is the main ingredient of the dish khoresh gheymeh, which is served on the side of white rice in Iranian cuisine. It is also an important ingredient in koofteh Tabrizi, a kofta speciality from northern Iran.

In north India, they are generally known as matar ki daal, sometimes used as a cheaper variation for chhole on stalls offering it.

Yellow split peas are most often used to prepare dal in Guyana, Suriname, Mauritius, South Africa, Trinidad and Tobago, Jamaica and Fiji. Referred to as simply dal, it is prepared similarly to dals found in India, but also may be used in other recipes.

Yellow split peas are used to make a sweet snack in Beijing cuisine. Wandouhuang (豌豆黄) is a sweetened and chilled pease pudding, sometimes flavored with osmanthus blossoms and dates.

In Europe, the Greek "fáva" is a dish made with yellow split peas pureed to create an appetizer or meze, often topped with capers. In Sweden, pea soup with salted pork and pancakes is traditionally served on Thursdays, particularly in the military.

In the winter the Dutch serve a dish called erwtensoep which is primarily made from green split peas.

In the Caribbean, split peas are a key ingredient in many Indian dishes.

In Trinidad and Tobago, it is also used as a base in many soups, including corn soup, cow heel soup, pig tail soup, etc. and it used to make a rice pilaf styled dish known as split peas and rice, traditionally consisting of split peas, rice and salted beef or pig tails cooked in coconut milk with various herbs and spices.

Moroccan Berber cuisine has “tamaraqt” or yellow split pea soup with olive oil and cumin added. Salt, garlic and onion can be added to taste. It is eaten with bread.

=== As plant milk ===
Peas have also been used as a common ingredient as part of plant milk, especially for the high content of protein that pea-based plant milk provides over alternatives such as plant milks made from soy, oats, almonds, or other varieties.

=== Cheese from Peas ===
Imitation cheese made from peas has been developed by researchers from the University of Nottingham and spin-out company The Good Pulse Company, which was founded by Cesar Torres. Yellow split peas are naturally high in protein, so a pea-based cheese substitute is higher in protein than conventional vegan cheese.

== See also ==
- Horsebread
- Marrowfat peas
- Pea milk
