= Khoresht mast =

Iranian side dish

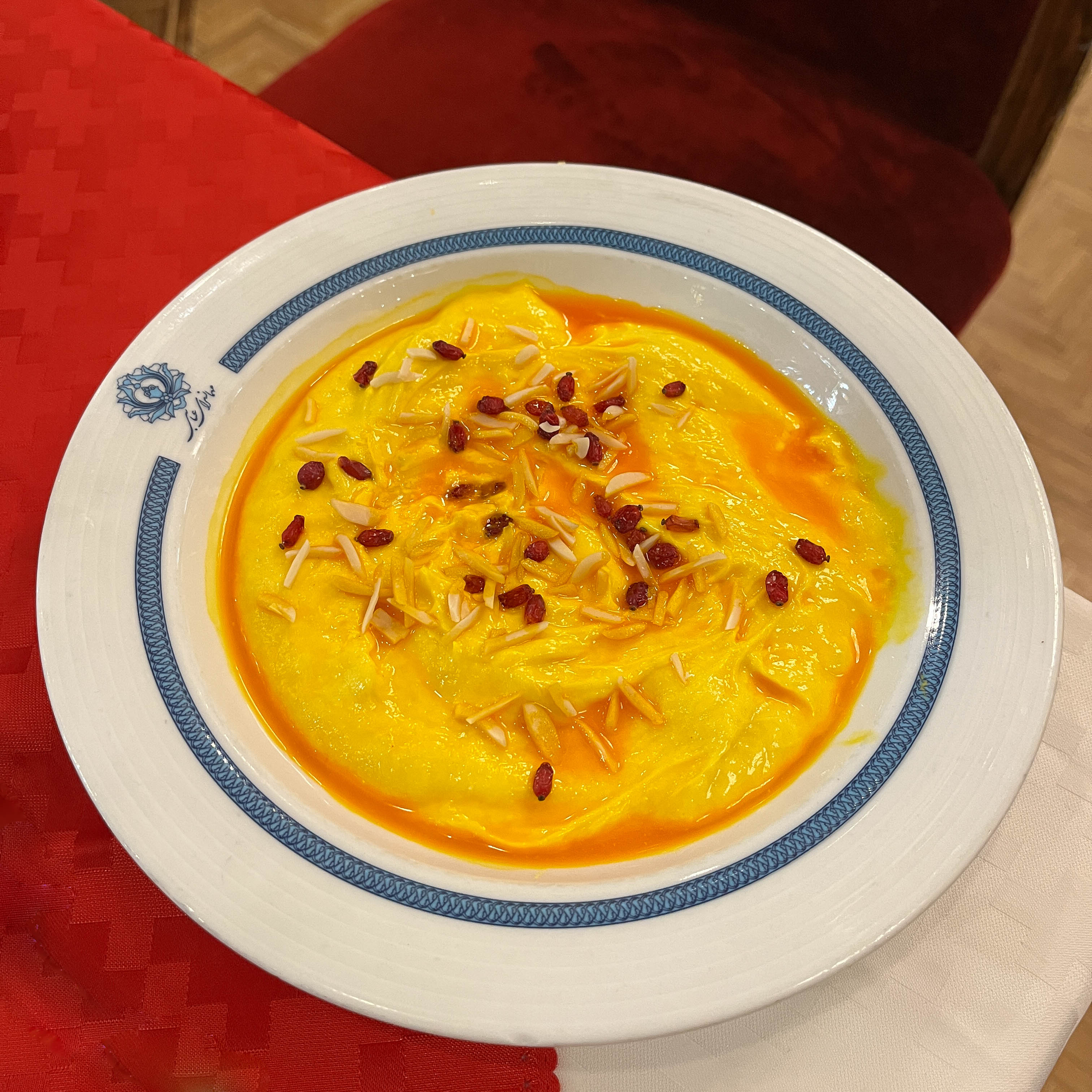
- Place of origin: Iran
- Region or state: Isfahan
- Main ingredients: lamb neck, egg, saffron, yoghurt, walnuts, pistachio, almond, sugar

Khoresht mast or Khoresh mas (Persian: خورش ماست, transliterally yogurt chow) is an Iranian side dish. It is served in a cold dish. Historically it is from Isfahan, Iran. It was a royal court main course but now it is served as a pre course or dessert.

== The Dish ==
Khoresh Mast is a traditional Iranian specialty from Isfahan, unique for its sweet profile and distinctive, elastic consistency. The dish is prepared by slow cooking lamb neck meat with onion and turmeric until tender, after which it is meticulously deboned and mashed, ideally in a copper pot, until it becomes white and stretchy. This meat base is then integrated into a heated mixture of thick, full-fat yogurt and sugar. The addition of strong brewed saffron gives the stew its iconic golden color, while rose water, slivered almonds, and walnut kernels provide a sophisticated floral aroma and textural depth.

While the base recipe focuses on the harmony of meat and dairy, the dish can be further enriched with egg yolks or cream for a more decadent finish. Once the ingredients are thoroughly combined and smooth, the stew is garnished with vibrant barberries and pistachio slivers. Essential to its traditional preparation is a twelve hour resting period in the refrigerator; this chilling process allows the flavors to meld and the texture to set perfectly before it is served. Although termed a stew, its unique preparation and chilled presentation often place it as a side dish or appetizer in Persian culinary traditions.
