= Chalow Gohreh =

Chalow Gohreh چلوگهره
- Village
- Location within Iran
- Coordinates: 27°43′51″N 56°03′18″E
- Country: Iran
- Province: Hormozgan
- County: Bandar Abbas
- Bakhsh: Fin
- Rural District: Gohreh

Population (2006)
  - Total: 319
- Time zone: UTC+3:30 (IRST)
  - Summer (DST): UTC+4:30 (IRDT)

Chalow Gohreh (Persian: چلوگهره) is a village in Gohreh Rural District, Fin District, Bandar Abbas County, Hormozgan Province, Iran. At the 2006 census, its population was 319, in 70 families.
