= Chalow-ye Gavmishi =

Chalow-ye Gavmishi چلوگاوميشي
- Village
- Location within Iran
- Coordinates: 27°08′16″N 56°59′04″E
- Country: Iran
- Province: Hormozgan
- County: Minab
- Bakhsh: Central
- Rural District: Tiab

Population (2006)
  - Total: 234
- Time zone: UTC+3:30 (IRST)
  - Summer (DST): UTC+4:30 (IRDT)

Chalow-ye Gavmishi (Persian: چلوگاوميشي, also Romanized as Chalow-ye Gāvmīshī and Chalow Gāvmīshī; also known as Chelow) is a village in Tiab Rural District, in the Central District of Minab County, Hormozgan Province, Iran. At the 2006 census, its population was 234, in 51 families.
