= Shahrak-e Chelow =

Shahrak-e Chelow شهرك چلو
- Village
- Location within Iran
- Coordinates: 31°57′42″N 50°31′32″E
- Country: Iran
- Province: Chaharmahal and Bakhtiari
- County: Ardal
- Bakhsh: Central
- Rural District: Dinaran

Population (2006)
  - Total: 552
- Time zone: UTC+3:30 (IRST)
  - Summer (DST): UTC+4:30 (IRDT)

Shahrak-e Chelow (Persian: شهرك چلو; also known as Chelow, Chol, and Deh Chowl) is a village in Dinaran Rural District, in the Central District of Ardal County, Chaharmahal and Bakhtiari Province, Iran. At the 2006 census, its population was 552, in 95 families. The village is populated by Lurs.
