= Gheimeh =

Iranian meat stew

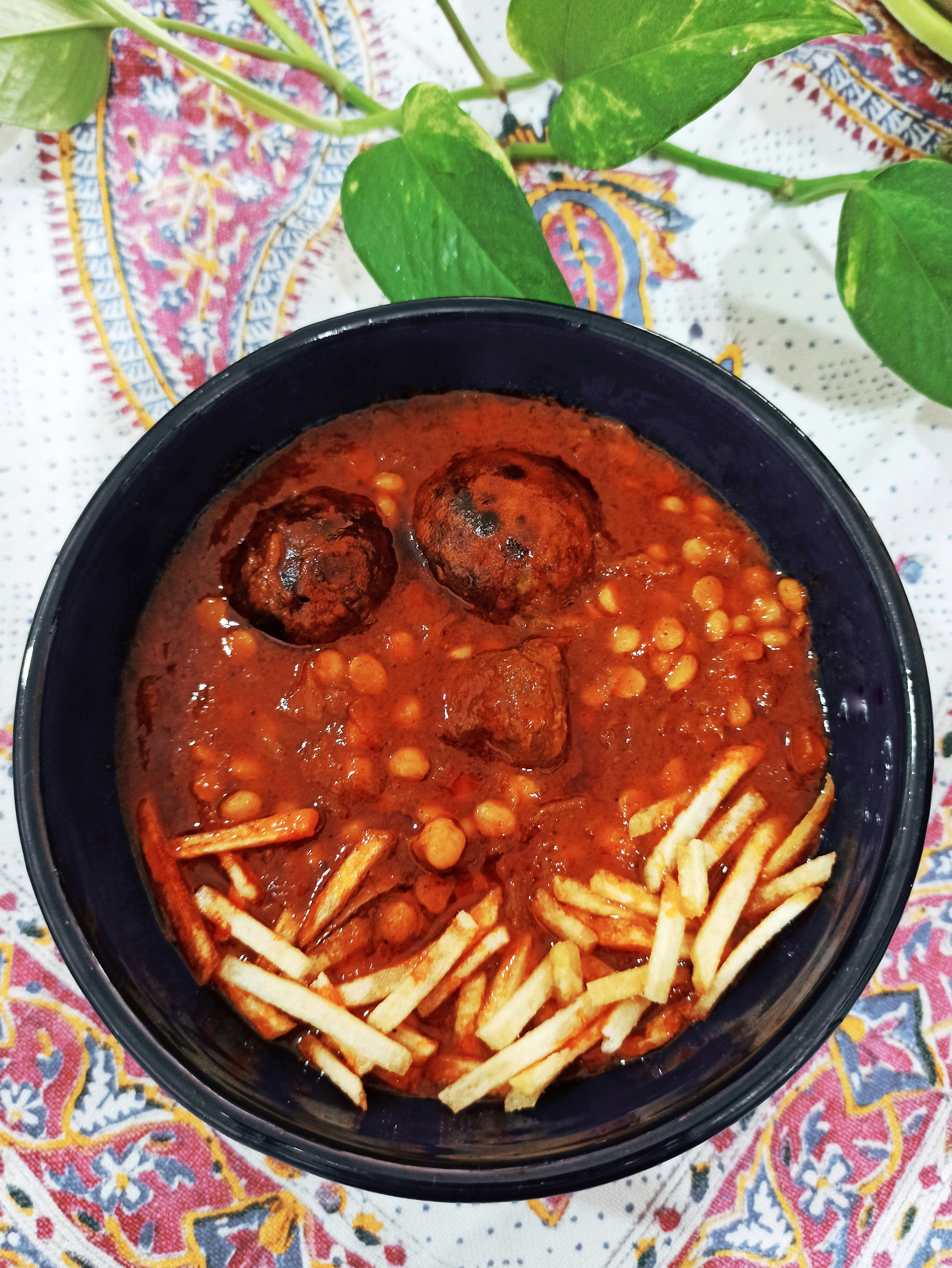
- Gheimeh stew
- Alternative names: Gheimeh, ghaymeh, qeimeh, qaymeh
- Type: Stew
- Course: Main dish
- Place of origin: Iran (Ancient Persia)
- Region or state: Fars, Ardabil, Qazvin, Bushahr, Kashan
- Associated cuisine: Iranian cuisine
- Created by: Persians
- Main ingredients: lamb, tomatoes, yellow split peas, onion, dried lime

Gheimeh, also spelled as gheymeh, or qeimeh (Persian: قیمه) is an Iranian stew (khoresh) consisting of diced mutton, tomatoes, split peas, onion, and dried lime, garnished with golden, thinly sliced crispy potatoes. The stew is sometimes garnished with fried eggplant and is usually served with white Persian rice (polow).

== Etymology ==
The Persian word gheimeh (also transliterated as qeimeh) derives from Classical Persian qeema, which comes from a Turkic word qıyma 'minced meat', like the Urdu qīmā/ keema, Turkish kıyma, and Greek kimás.

== Iraqi variant ==
In Iraq, especially in the Shi’a holy cities of Najaf and Karbala, the Persian stew khoresh-e gheimeh (qeema) has become a beloved part of local cuisine, largely through the Iranian pilgrims visiting the cities. For centuries, Iranian pilgrims have traveled to these cities for ziyarat, especially during major events like Arba’een. They brought their culinary traditions—including gheimeh, a hearty Persian stew made with split peas, tomato, sun-dried Persian lime, and meat, often topped with fried potatoes. Over time, Iraqis adopted and adapted the dish, incorporating it into religious gatherings and communal meals, particularly during Muharram. Today, gheimeh is commonly served at mawakib (free food stands) during pilgrimage events. It can also eaten on Easter, Christmas, funerals and weddings.

== Iranian variants ==
- Gheimeh sibzamini (Persian: قیمه سیب زمینی): with thin-cut French fries.
- Gheimeh bademjan (Persian: قیمه بادمجان): with pan-fried whole or long-cut eggplants.
- Gheimeh nesar (Persian: قیمه نثار): with almonds and fried onions; a specialty of Qazvin.
- Pichagh gheimeh (Persian: پیچاق قیمه): a different dish with almonds and fried onions; a specialty of Ardabil. Pichagh (Azeri spelling: pıçaq) means knife in the Azerbaijani language, and it refers to the almonds.
- Gheimeh rashti (Persian: قیمه‌ رشتی): with sour pomegranate paste, pomegranate juice, tomato, and verjuice; a specialty of Rasht.
- Gheimeh nokhoud (Persian: قیمه‌ نخود): with chickpeas instead of split peas; a specialty of the Persian Gulf coast of Iran; including Bushehr.
- Gheimeh kadou (Persian: قیمه‌ کدو): with pan-fried whole or long-cut squash.
- Gheimeh beh (Persian: قیمه به): with pan-fried whole or long cut quinces.
- Gheimeh bamieh (Persian: قیمه بامیه): with pan-fried okra. It also has lemon juice and cinnamon.
- Gheimeh jahromi (Persian: قیمه‌ جهرمی): with chickpeas and meat. a speciality of Jahrom.

== See also ==
- List of lamb dishes
- List of stews
