= Pomegranate molasses =

Middle eastern condiment made from reduced pomegranate juice

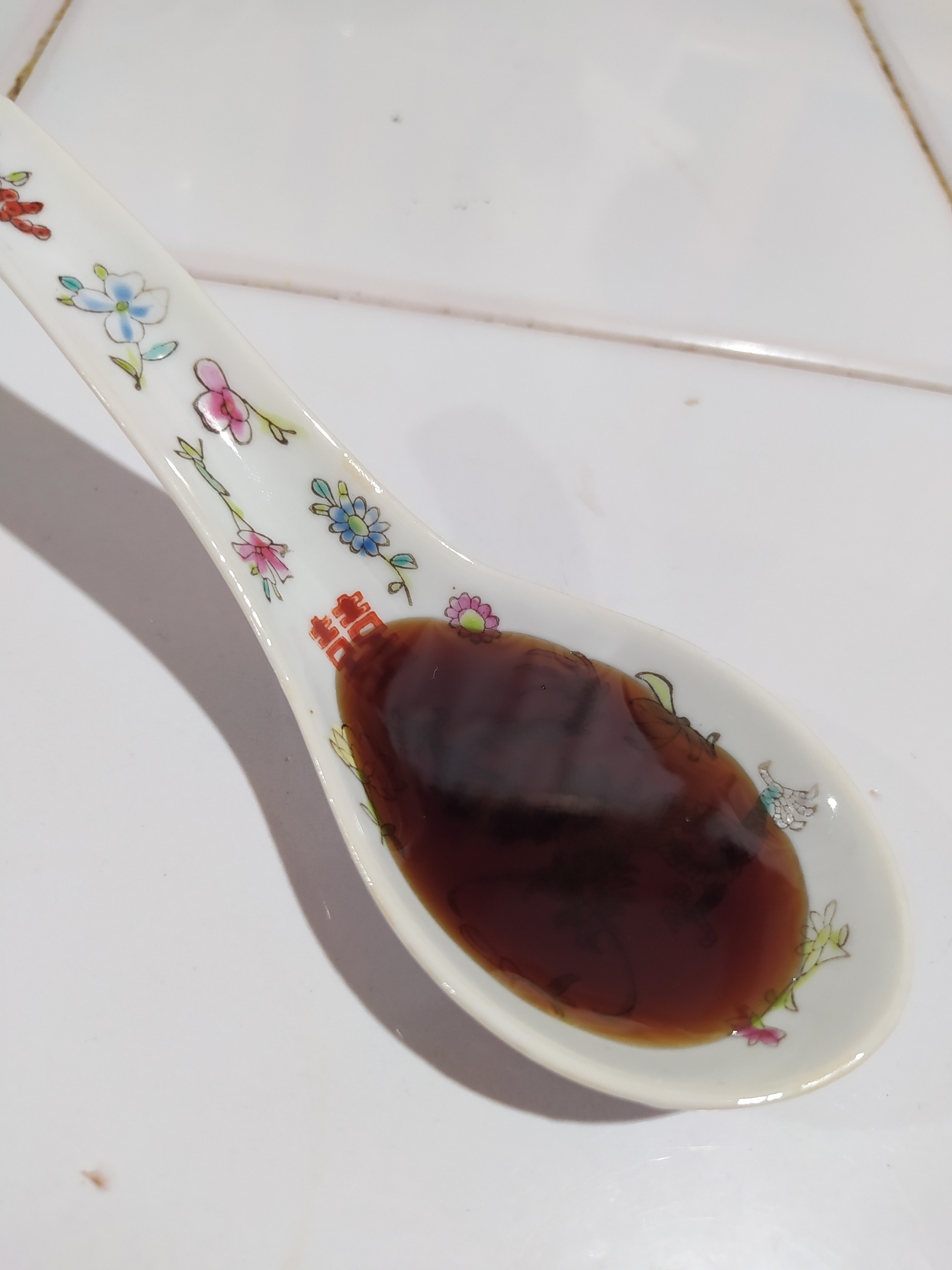
- Alternative names: Dibs ar-rumman, robb-e anâr, melása rodioú, narsharab, nar ekşisi, nuri matsuk
- Type: Condiment
- Region or state: West Asia, South Caucasus, Anatolia, Balkans, Levant
- Main ingredients: Pomegranate

Pomegranate molasses, also known as narsharab (Persian: انارشراب; Azerbaijani: narşarab), dibs ar-rumman (Arabic: دِبْس الرُّمَّان), robb-e anâr (Persian: رب انار), melása rodioú (Greek: μελάσα ροδιού, "pomegranate syrup"), nar ekshisi (Turkish: nar ekşisi, "pomegranate sour"; Armenian: նարշարապ; Persian: نارشارَب, "pomegranate wine"), and nuri matsuk (Armenian: նուռի մածուկ, "pomegranate syrup") is a Middle Eastern, South Caucasian and Balkan condiment consisting of concentrated pomegranate juice. It is usually used in fish and meat dishes, and also as a dressing in salads.

== Etymology ==
The word narsharab, from Persian: انارشراب, romanized: (a)nârsharâb, literally means pomegranate wine, although it contains no alcohol. It contains 10% citric acid sugar. Dishes get a light sour taste because of narsharab.

== Preparation ==
Recipes for narsharab vary. Commonly, unpeeled pomegranates are squeezed and heated to evaporate the juice. It is cooked to half its original volume. After the juice is thickened, sugar, coriander, basil, and cinnamon, and sometimes black or red pepper, are added.

== See also ==
- Nardenk
- Azerbaijani cuisine
- Armenian cuisine
- Turkish cuisine
- Levantine cuisine
- Arabic cuisine
- Middle Eastern cuisine
- Iranian cuisine
- Sharots
