= Dried lime =

Lime that has lost its water content after being dried under extensive sunlight

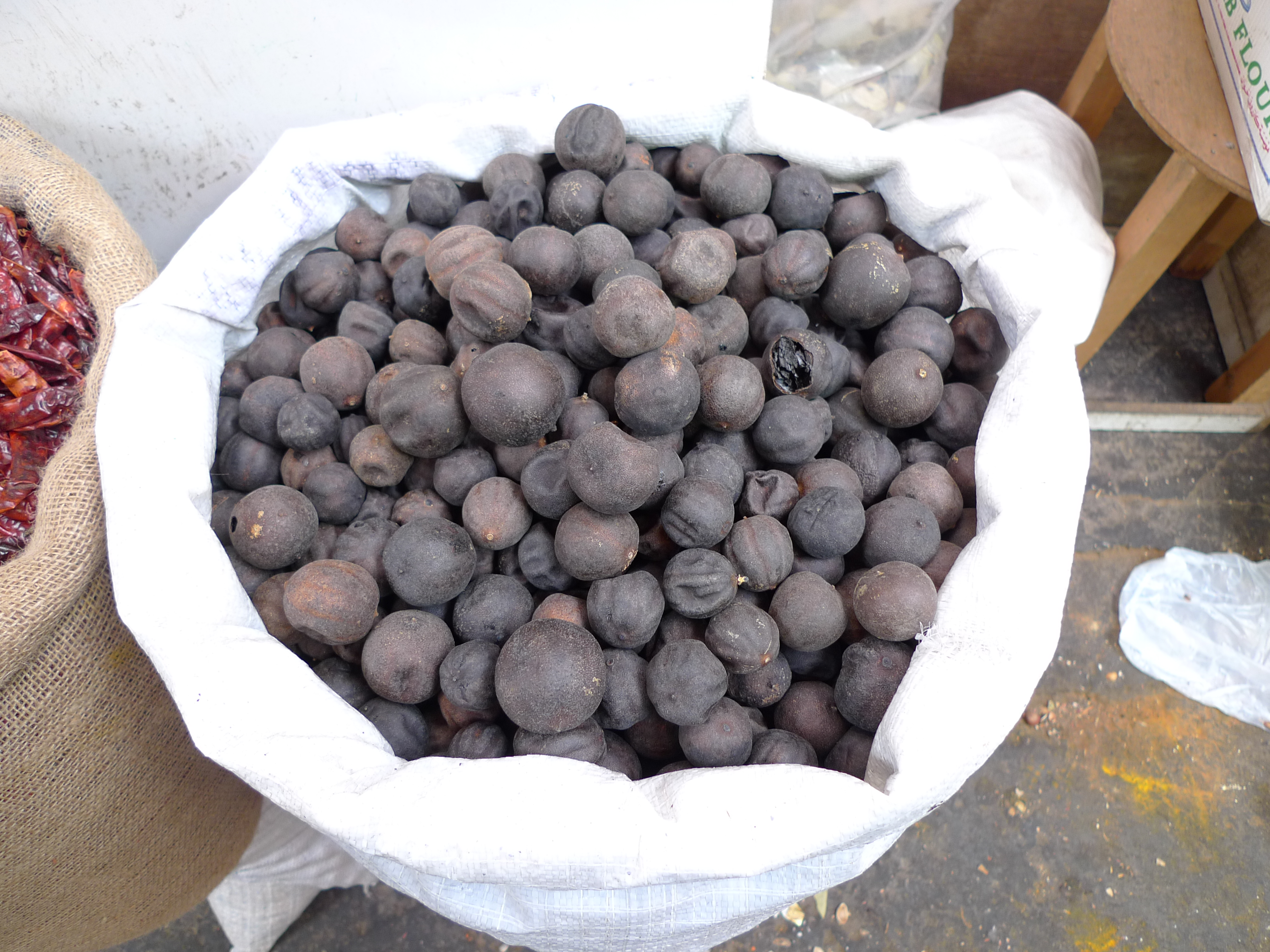
- Whole loomi for sale in market in Manama, Bahrain
- Type: Dried food
- Place of origin: Oman, Iraq and Iran
- Region or state: Middle East
- Associated cuisine: Middle Eastern

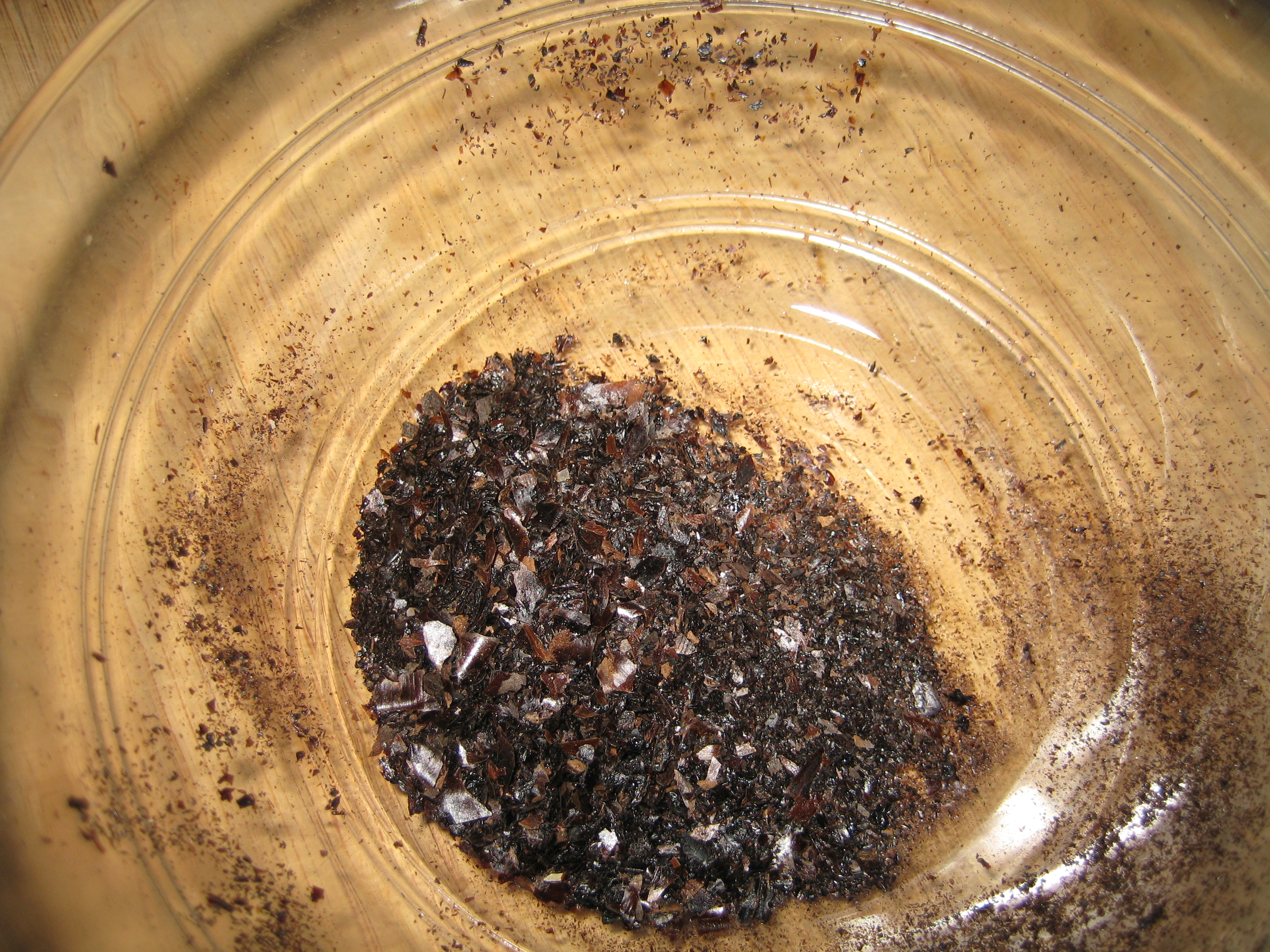
Dried, ground black Persian limes

Dried lime, also known as black lime, noomi basra (Iraq), limoo amani (Iran), and loomi (Oman), is a lime that has lost its water content, usually after having spent a majority of its drying time in the sun. They are used whole, sliced, or ground as a spice in Middle Eastern cuisine. Originating in the Persian Gulf – hence the Iranian name limoo amani and the Iraqi name noomi basra ('lemon from Basra') – dried limes are popular in cooking across the Middle East.

== Uses ==
Dried limes are used to add a sour depth and flavor to dishes, through a process known as souring. In Persian cuisine, they are used to flavor stews and soups. Across the Middle East, they are used with fish; in Iraq, they are added to almost all dishes and forms of stuffing. They can also be used to make dried lime tea. Powdered dried lime is also used as an ingredient in Middle Eastern-style baharat (a spice mixture). It is a traditional ingredient in the cuisines of Saudi Arabia, Iraq, and other countries of the Persian Gulf.

== Flavor ==
Dried limes are strongly flavored. They taste sour and citrusy like fresh limes, but have an added earthy and somewhat smoky taste and lack the sweetness of fresh limes. Because they are preserved, they also have a slightly bitter, fermented flavor, but the bitter accents are mainly concentrated in the lime's outer skin (zest) and seeds.

== Tea ==
Dried lime tea is a type of herbal tea made from dried limes and is a popular beverage in Iraq, where it is used to aid indigestion, diarrhea, and nausea.

== See also ==
- List of dried foods
