= Saray helva =

Turkish confectionery

- Place of origin: Turkey
- Variations: Pişmaniye

Saray helva (Turkish Saray Helvası) is a popular Turkish dessert.

== Ingredients ==
The dessert is made of white sugar, wheat flour, butter, vegetable margarine and vanillin flavor.

== See also ==
- Sohan papdi
- Shekarpareh
- Pişmaniye
- Sohan (confectionery)
- Sohan Halwa
- List of Turkish desserts
