= Ghazal Al Banat =

Ghazal Al Banat (Arabic: غزل البنات) can refer to:

- A sweet similar to cotton candy, essentially identical to Persian pashmak.
- The Flirtation of Girls, 1949 Egyptian film.
- Ghazal el-Banat, 1985 Lebanese film.

The term literally translates as "threads/flirtation of girls"; see ghazal for more.
