= Sohan halwa =

South Asian dessert

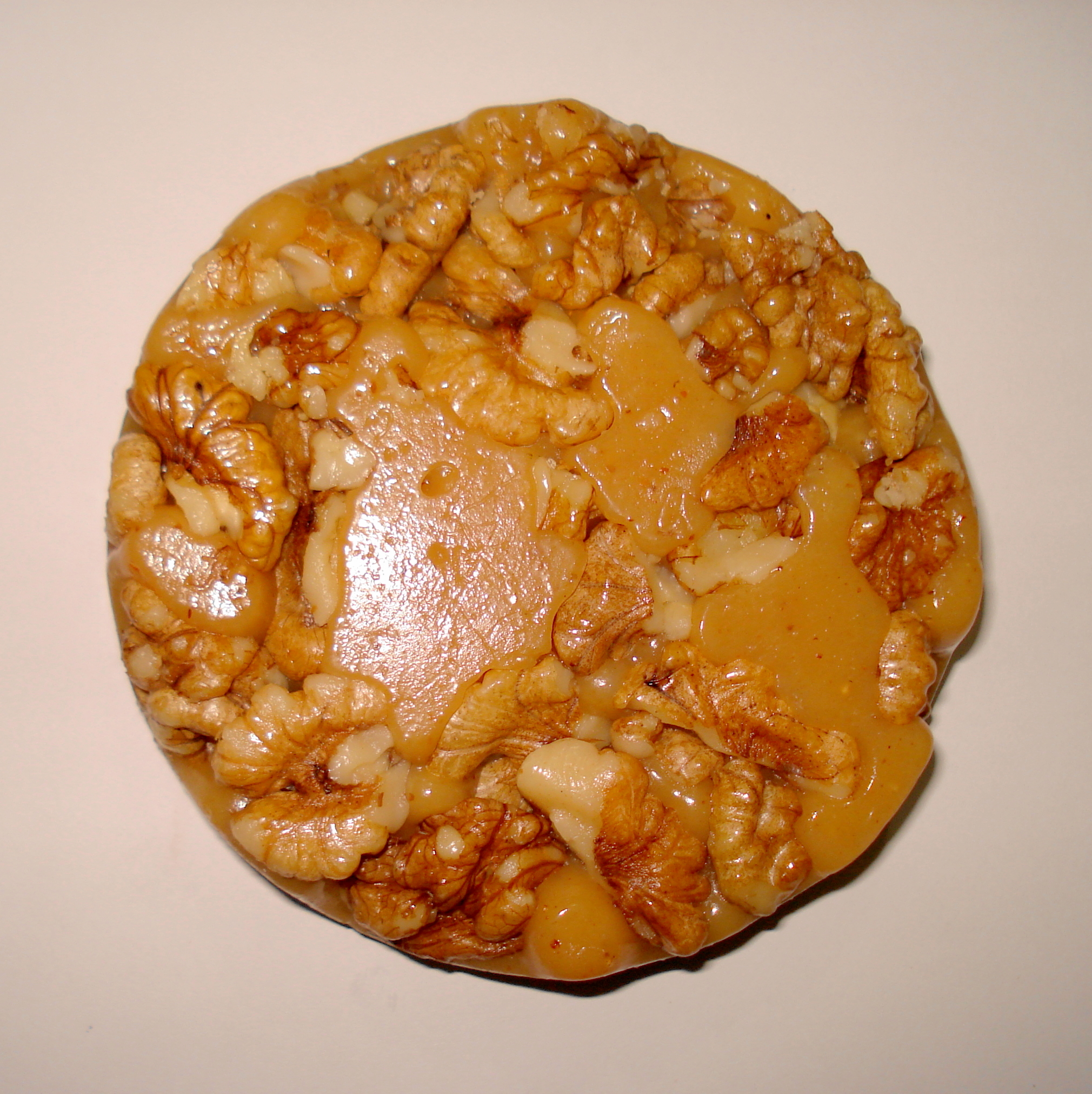
- A variation of sohan halwa in the form of a circular disc
- Course: Dessert
- Place of origin: Indian subcontinent
- Main ingredients: Cornflour, sugar, milk, water, almonds and walnuts
- Variations: Multani sohan halwa
- Other information: Halva

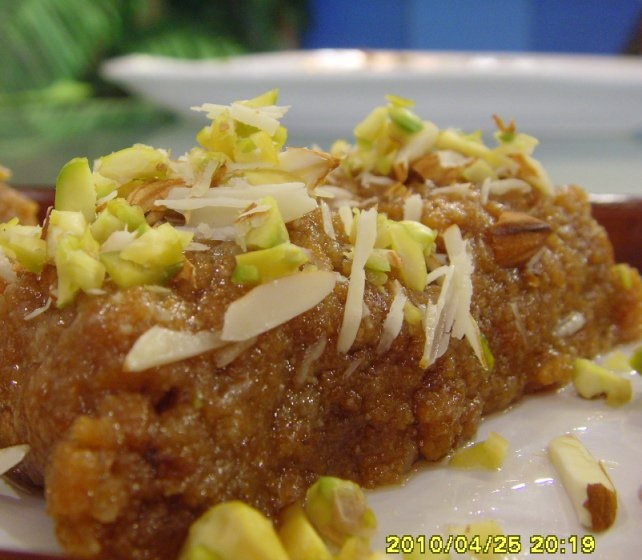
Multani sohan halwa

Sohan Halwa ([ˈsoːɦən ˈɦəlʋaː]) is a dessert from the Indian subcontinent, which is a variety of dense, sweet confection or halwa. It is made by boiling a mixture of water, sugar, milk, and cornflour until it becomes solid. Saffron is used for flavoring. Ghee is used to prevent it from sticking to the pan. Almonds, pistachios, and cardamom seeds are added. A part of Mughlai cuisine, unlike most other halwa dishes from the Indian subcontinent, is very dense.

One of its varieties, known as Multani or Hafiz Sohan Halwa, is very popular in Pakistani cuisine, particularly Saraiki cuisine.

== History ==
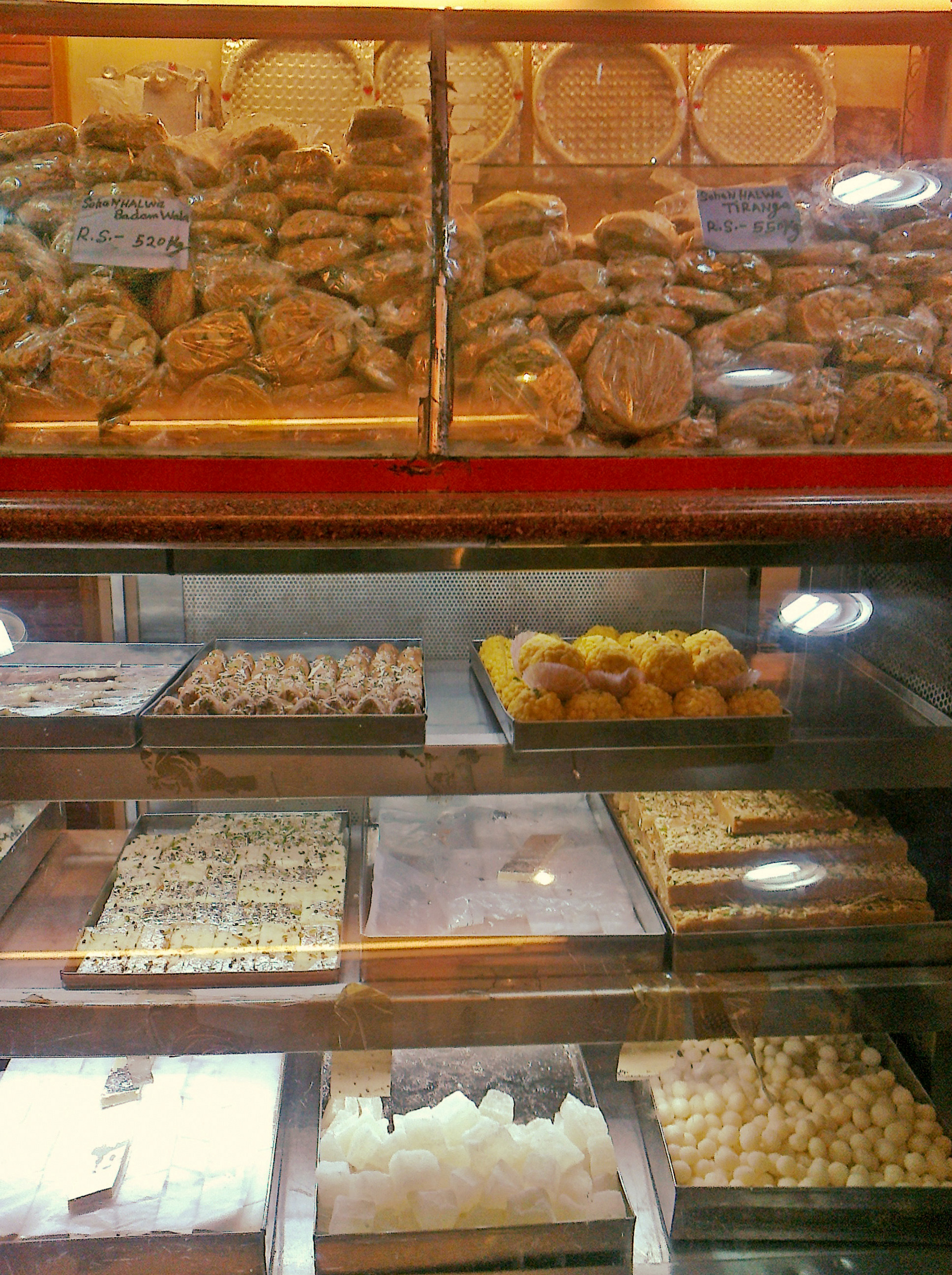
Sohan halwa (top shelf) and other traditional sweets at Chandni Chowk, Delhi

The name of the sweet according to various dictionaries derives from sohan in Hindustani, which is etymologically derived from the Sanskrit word shobhan ("beautiful"). Though the origins of the dish are highly debated, the oldest recorded sweet shop that sold Sohan Halwa, was in Delhi.

According to John Thompson Platts' Dictionary of Urdu, Classical Hindi and English, the sweet was named after a Hindu confectioner called Sohan Lal. While others give credit to the 19th-century Governor of Multan Diwan Sawan Mal Chopra or further trace the sweet dish to Persia during the Mughal era. Going further back, in Old Delhi, in 1790, a Ghantewala sweet shop established during the reign of Mughal Emperor Shah Alam II made Sohan Halwa. It was a popular attraction, but in 2015 it closed due to a lack of profitability.

== Commercial production ==
Sohan halwa has been commercially produced by traditional confectioners for decades. It is brittle and caramelised, usually made into discs of 5-6mm thickness or as square bite-size pieces. It is usually packaged in intricately designed tin cylinders. In recent years other packages have also been common.

== See also ==
- Baklava
- Basbousa
- Halva
- Pişmaniye
- Saray helva
- Shekarpareh
- Sohan (confectionery)
- Soan papdi
