= Soan papdi =

Indian dessert

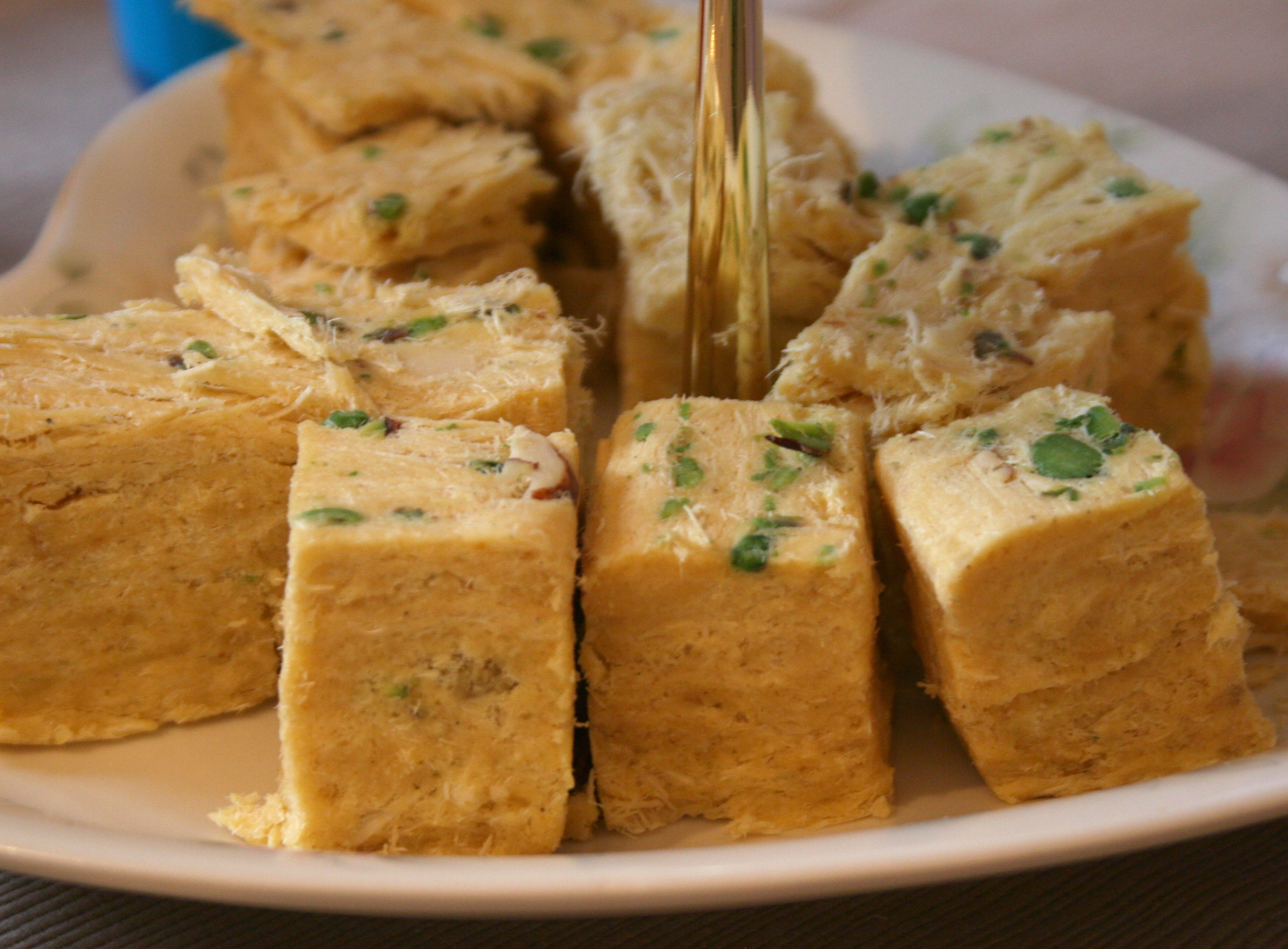
- Soan papdi
- Alternative names: Son papdi, sohan papdi, san papri, shonpapdi, shompapri, shonpapdi, patisa
- Place of origin: Indian subcontinent
- Associated cuisine: India, Pakistan, Bangladesh
- Main ingredients: Gram flour, sugar, flour, ghee, milk, cardamom
- Food energy (per serving): 30 kcal (130 kJ)

Soan papdi is a popular dessert in the Indian subcontinent. It is made of gram flour (besan), all-purpose flour, ghee, sugar, and milk. It is usually cube-shaped or served as flakes, and has a crisp and flaky texture. Traditionally sold loose in rolled paper cones, modern industrial production has led to it being sold in the form of tightly formed cubes. It is frequently given as a traditional Diwali gift.

== Origin ==
Soan papdi, whose name means "golden flaky layer", has no definitively confirmed origin.

One hypothesis is that it originated in the western state of Maharashtra, India. Other sources name Uttar Pradesh or Gujarat as the originator of this sweet.

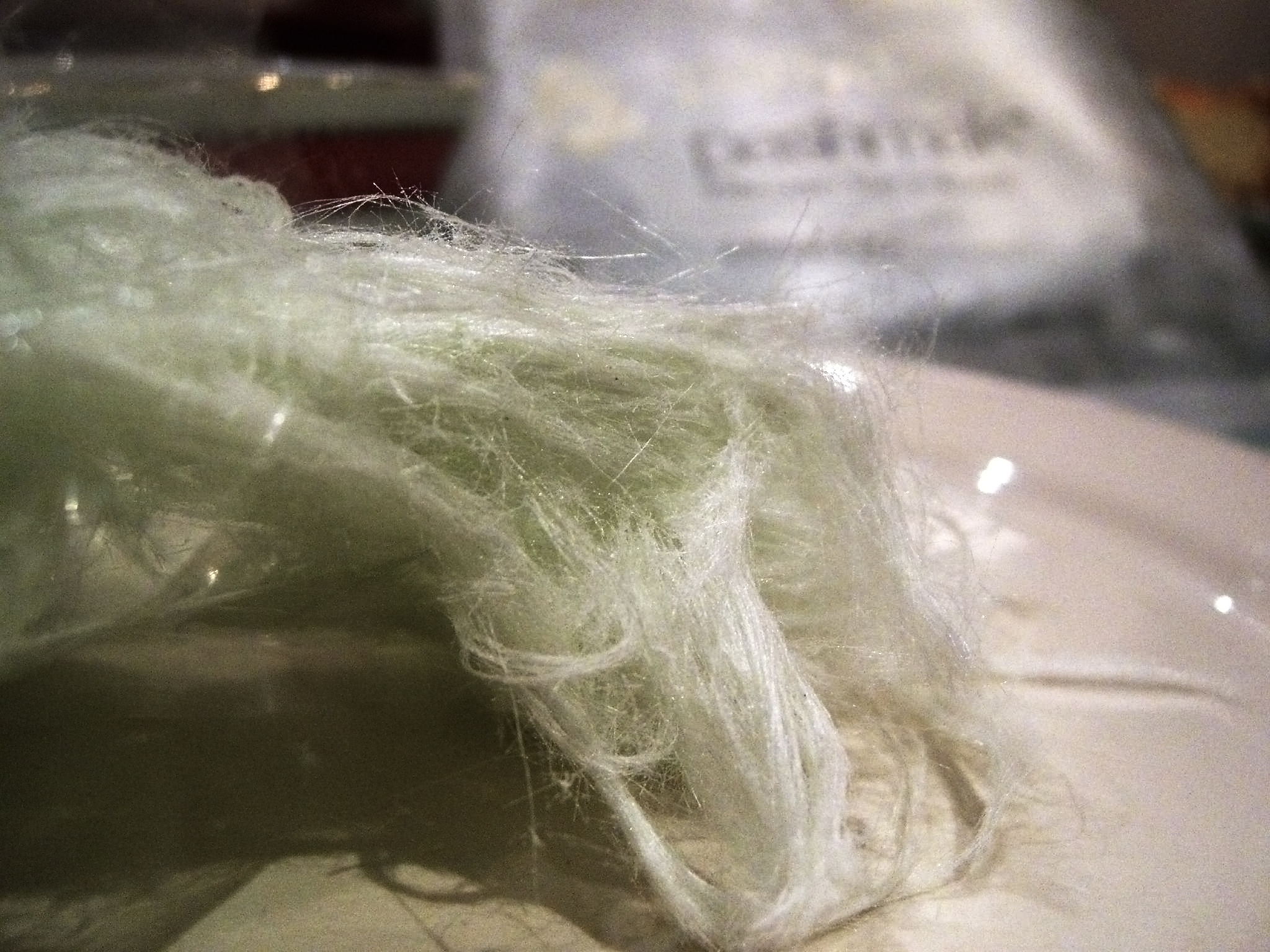
Pashmak

Culinary anthropologist Kurush F. Dalal states that soan papdi is a Persian dish, with the word "soan" being of Persian origin from the dessert sohan pashmaki.

It bears some resemblance to dragon's beard candy in China, kkul-tarae in Korea, and Persian pashmaki, which gave rise to the Turkish pişmaniye.

== Ingredients ==
Its main ingredients are sugar, gram flour, flour, ghee, almond, milk, and cardamom.

== See also ==
- Sohan (confectionery)
- Sohan halwa
- Pişmaniye, a similar Turkish dessert
- Pashmak, a similar Iranian dessert
- Dragon's beard candy, a similar Chinese dessert
  - Kkul-tarae, its Korean variant
