= Dragon's beard candy =

Chinese candy

- Traditional Chinese: 龍鬚糖
- Simplified Chinese: 龙须糖
- Literal meaning: dragon beard candy
Transcriptions
Standard Mandarin
- Hanyu Pinyin: lóng xū táng
Yue: Cantonese
- Jyutping: lung4 sou1 tong4*2

Alternative Chinese name
- Traditional Chinese: 銀絲糖
- Simplified Chinese: 银丝糖
- Literal meaning: silver silk candy
Transcriptions
Standard Mandarin
- Hanyu Pinyin: yín sī táng
Yue: Cantonese
- Jyutping: ngan4 si1 tong4*2

Second alternative Chinese name
- Traditional Chinese: 龍鬚酥
- Simplified Chinese: 龙须酥
- Literal meaning: dragon whiskers pastry
Transcriptions
Standard Mandarin
- Hanyu Pinyin: lóng xū sū

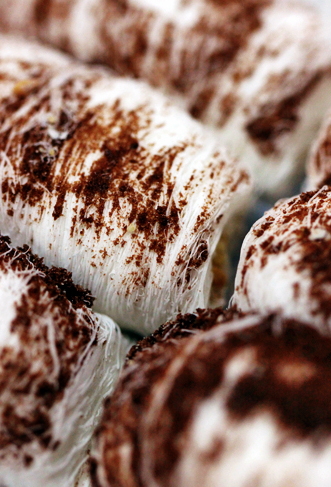
Dragon's beard candy

Dragon's beard candy (traditional Chinese: 龍鬚糖; simplified Chinese: 龙须糖; pinyin: lóng xū táng) or Chinese cotton candy or Longxusu (simplified Chinese: 龙须酥; traditional Chinese: 龍鬚酥; pinyin: lóng xū sū) is a handmade traditional Chinese confectionary similar to floss halva or Western cotton candy. Dragon's beard candy was initially created in China, but was soon popularized in other parts of East Asia and South East Asia. It became a regional delicacy in South Korea in the 1990s, Singapore in the 1980s, then in Canada and the United States.

It has a low sugar content (19%) and low saturated fat content (2%). By comparison, cotton candy is fat free with a very high sugar content (94%). Dragon's beard candy has a very short shelf life. It is highly sensitive to moisture and tends to melt in warm temperatures.

== History ==
The origins of this ancient candy is largely unknown, though there are a few different legends that exist. One says that dragon's beard candy was invented during the Chinese Han dynasty by an imperial court chef who entertained the emperor one day by performing the complicated steps in making a new confection, which involved stretching a dough-like mixture composed from rice flour into small, thin strands. These strands reminded the emperor of a dragon's beard, and were sticky enough to adhere to one's face easily, so the concoction was named. The name may also be attributed to the status of the mythical dragon as a symbol of the Chinese emperor, so presenting the confection as Dragon's Beard Candy was deemed acceptable due to the social nature of the candy. It was reserved only for the ruling class due to the complexity of the preparation process. Nevertheless, the art has resurfaced in tourist destinations such as street festivals.

== Preparation ==
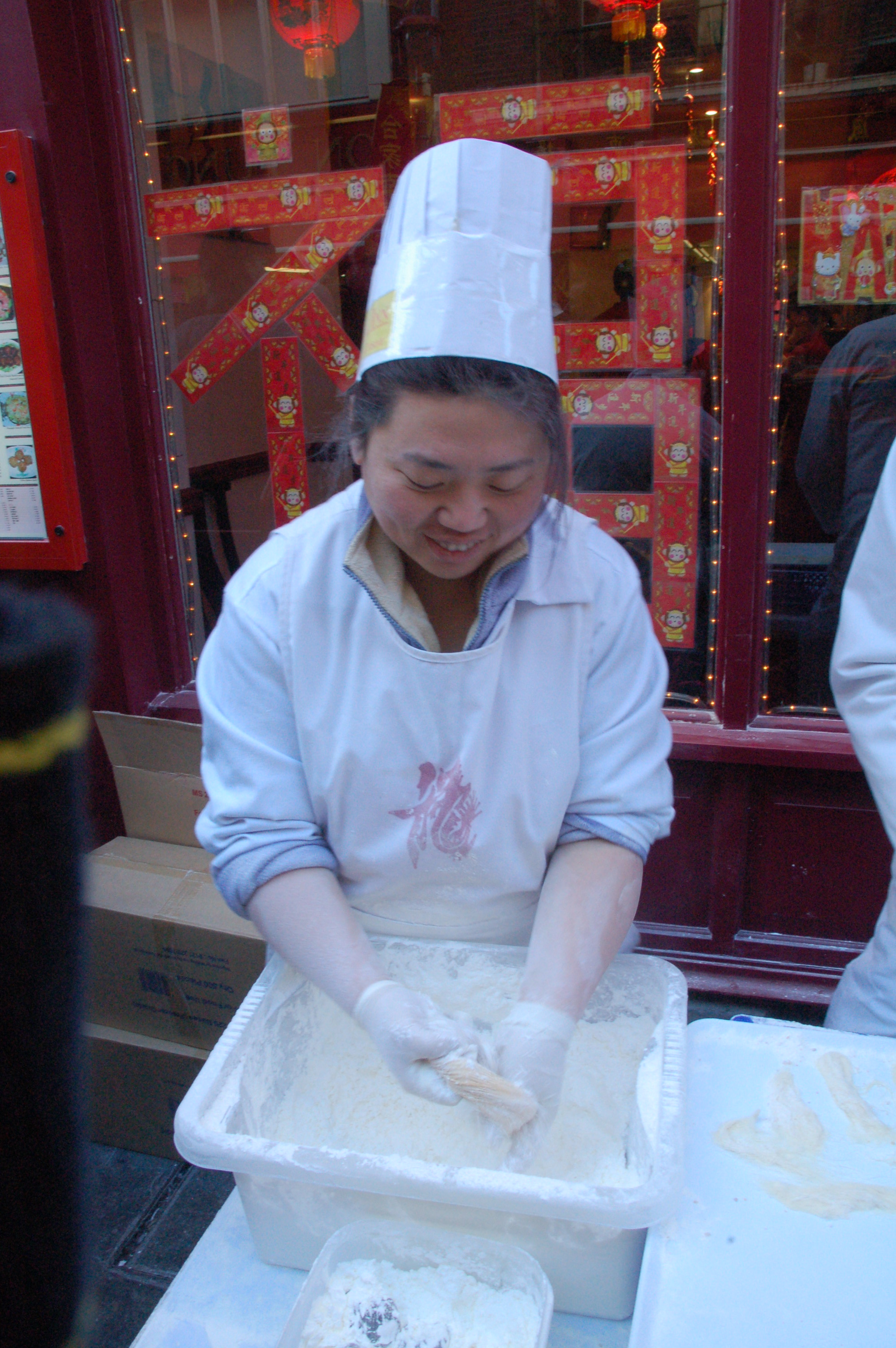
Dragon's beard candy being made

Traditionally, it is made from sugar and maltose syrup, although recipes based on corn syrup are now used in the United States. The main ingredients include approximately 75 grams of fine white sugar, 75 grams of peanuts, 75 grams of desiccated coconut, 38 grams of white sesame seeds, 150 grams of maltose syrup, and 1 bowl of glutinous rice flour.

== Comparison to cotton candy ==
Both cotton candy and dragon's beard candy are made of sugar and share the characteristic of notable stickiness and a high sensitivity to moisture. Both substances will clump together when exposed to the air for a certain amount of time. However, cotton candy has a larger surface area, thus allowing a small amount of sugar to generate into a greater volume of product. Its serving on each stick is 37 grams, including food dyes and flavor, containing around 110 calories per serving. While dragon's beard candy contains a lower content of sugar (7.2 grams), it contains a slightly higher caloric content of 141.2, and a higher fat content (6.1 grams), compared to cotton candy, typically containing 0g of fat. This is due to the peanuts, sesame seeds, and other ingredients, whereas cotton candy is close to 100% sugars. The nutritional value of the wrapping alone is essentially identical to that of cotton candy.

== See also ==
- Cotton candy
  - Kkultarae - a Korean variant
  - Pashmak - a Persian variant
  - Pişmaniye - a Turkish variant
  - Sohan papdi - an Indian variant
