= William Morrison (dentist) =

American dentist and inventor (1860–1926)

William James Morrison (1860–1926) was an American dentist and inventor who is best known for developing the cotton candy machine.

== Career ==
Morrison, from Nashville, Tennessee, was an avid inventor, and has a number of inventions to his credit. One of them is the first cotton candy (originally named Fairy Floss and named candy floss in the UK and fairy floss in Australia) machine, which he invented in 1897 in cooperation with confectioner John C. Wharton. This electric machine melted sugar and then used forced-air to push it through a wire screen. It was introduced at the 1904 St. Louis World's Fair, and was a big success. Thomas Patton and Josef Delarose Lascaux also claimed to invent the cotton candy machine.
