= Cotton candy =

Spun sugar confection

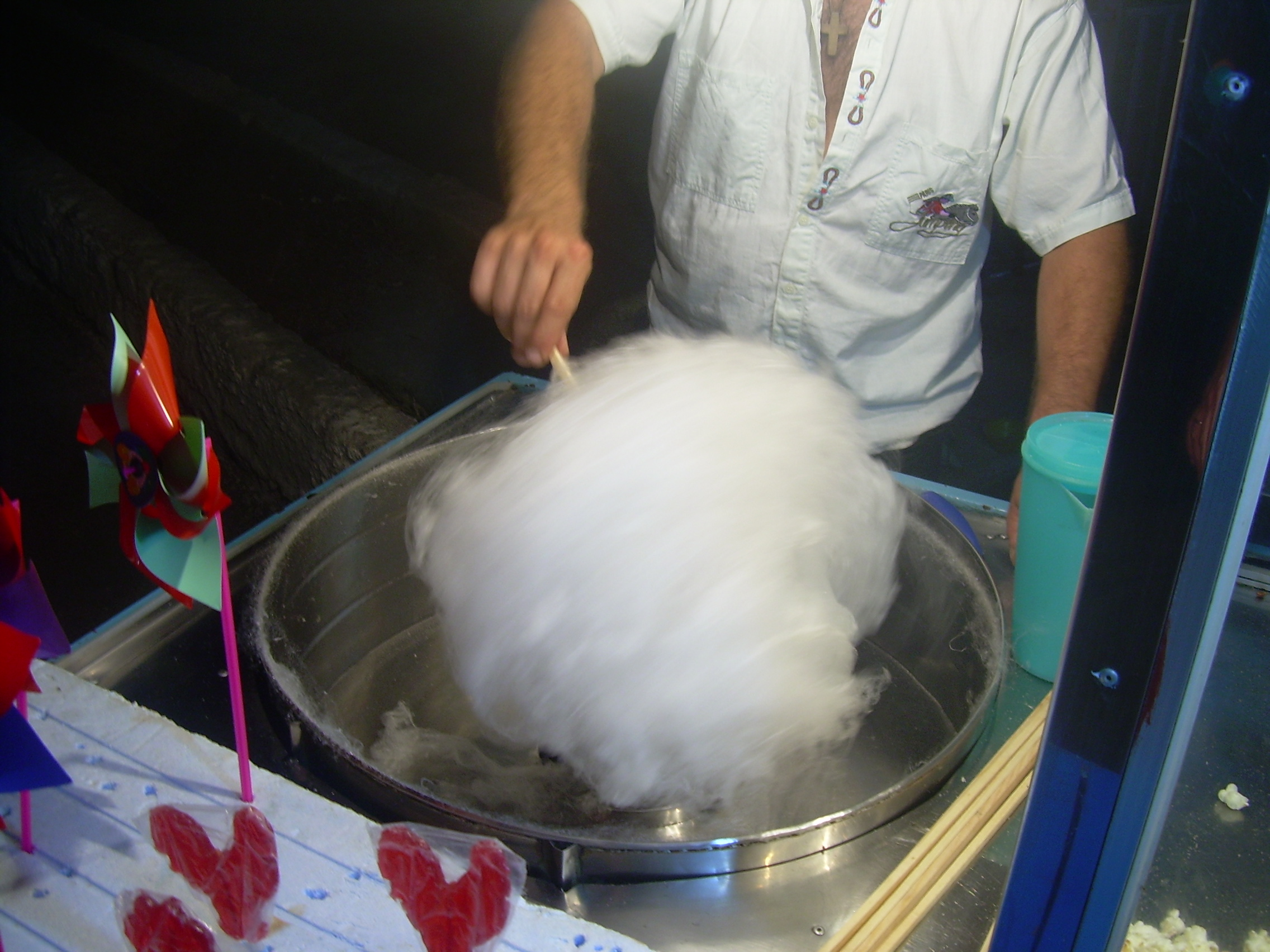
- Spinning cotton candy at a fair
- Alternative names: Candy floss (candyfloss), fairy floss
- Type: Confectionery
- Region or state: United States
- Main ingredients: Sugar, food coloring

Cotton candy, also known as candy floss (candyfloss) and fairy floss, is a spun sugar confection that resembles cotton. It is made by heating and liquefying sugar, and spinning it centrifugally through minute holes, causing it to rapidly cool and re-solidify into fine strands. It usually contains small amounts of food flavoring and it naturally bears the color of the sugar it is made of, often altered with food coloring.

It is often sold at fairs, circuses, carnivals, and festivals, served in a plastic bag, on a stick, or in a paper cone.

It is made and sold globally, as candy floss in the United Kingdom, Ireland, India, and South Africa, and as fairy floss in Australia. Similar confections include the Chinese longxusu, the Korean kkul-tarae and the Iranian pashmak.

== History ==
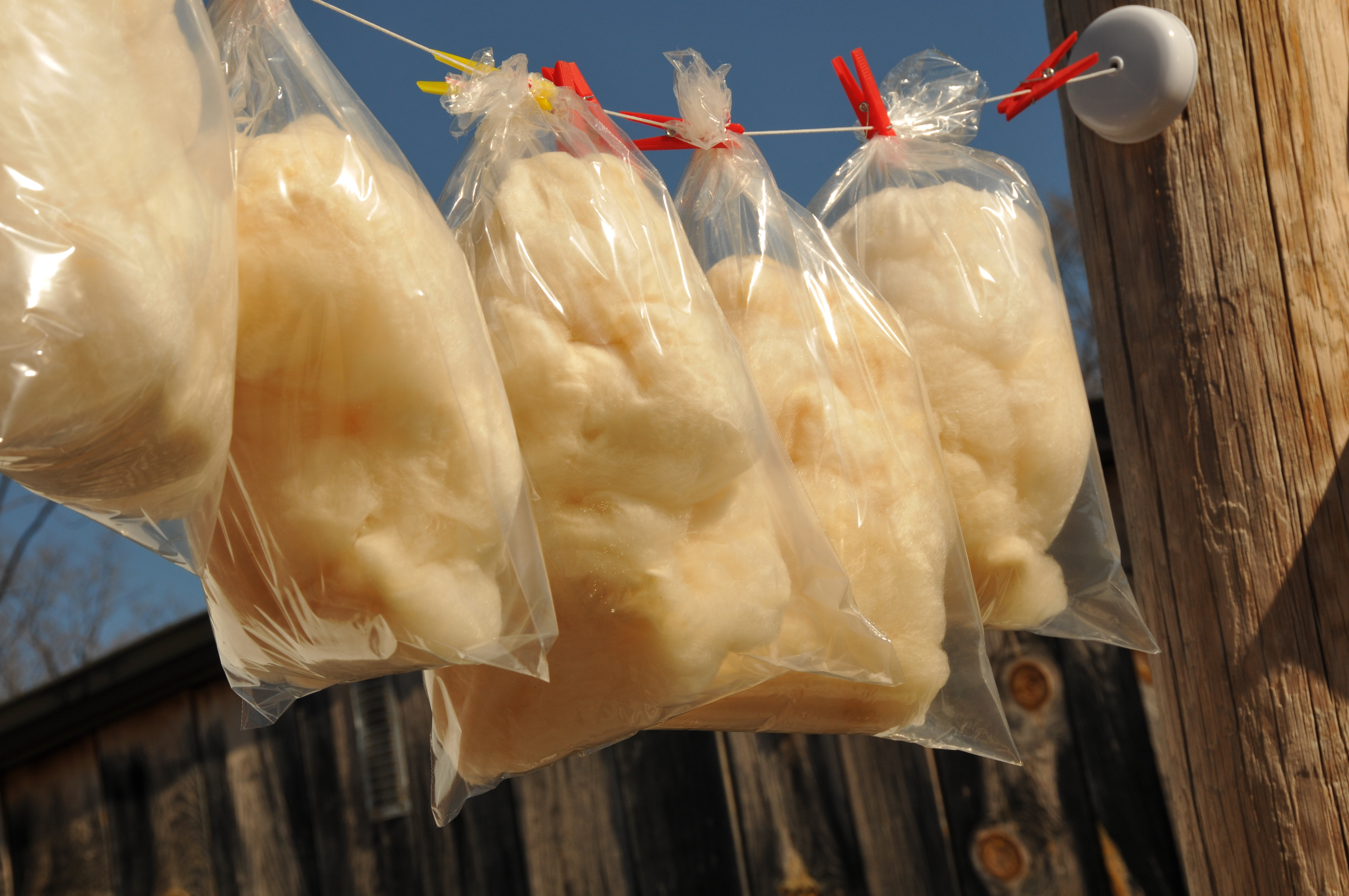
Maple-flavored cotton candy at the cabane à sucre (sugar shack), Pakenham, Canada

Several sources track the origin of cotton candy to a form of spun sugar found in Europe in the 19th century. At that time, spun sugar was an expensive, labor-intensive endeavor and was not generally available to the average person. Others suggest versions of spun sugar originated in Italy as early as the 15th century.

Machine-spun cotton candy was invented in 1897 by dentist William Morrison and confectioner John C. Wharton, and first introduced to a wide audience at the 1904 World's Fair as Fairy Floss with great success, selling 68,655 boxes at 25¢ ($8.96 today) per box.

In late 1903, while the fairgrounds in St. Louis were still under construction, a visitor described the new confection and its manufacture: "Electricity has a new use--that of spinning candy. 'Fairy Floss' is the name of the dainty. Samples of it look like pink cotton such as they pack around Christmas jewelry. The inventor desires to manufacture the confection on the grounds where the public can see it done. The candy mixture is put in a hopper and the current turned on. The filmy web soon becomes visible, and as it grows the color and flavor and perhaps chopped meats of nuts are sprinkled in the web. The taste is such as to make it immediately marketable."

On 6 September 1905, Albert D. Robinson of Lynn, Massachusetts submitted his patent for an electric candy-spinning machine, a combination of an electronic starter and motor-driven rotatable bowl that maintained heating efficiently. By May 1907, he transferred the rights to the General Electric Company of New York. His patent remains today as the basic cotton candy machine. In 1905 fairy floss was introduced to Australian children, for whom it remains a show-time treat.

In 1915, food writer Julia Davis Chandler described "Candy Cotton" being sold at the Panama–Pacific International Exposition.

Joseph Lascaux, a dentist from New Orleans, Louisiana, invented a similar cotton candy machine in 1921. His patent named the sweet confection "cotton candy", eventually overtaking the name ‘fairy floss’, although it retains this name in Australia. In the 1970s, an automatic cotton candy machine was created which made the product and packaged it, making it easier to produce at carnivals, stalls and other events requiring more portable production.

Tootsie Roll Industries, the world's largest cotton candy manufacturer, produces a bagged, fruit-flavored version called Fluffy Stuff.

In the United States, National Cotton Candy Day is celebrated on 7 December.

== Production ==
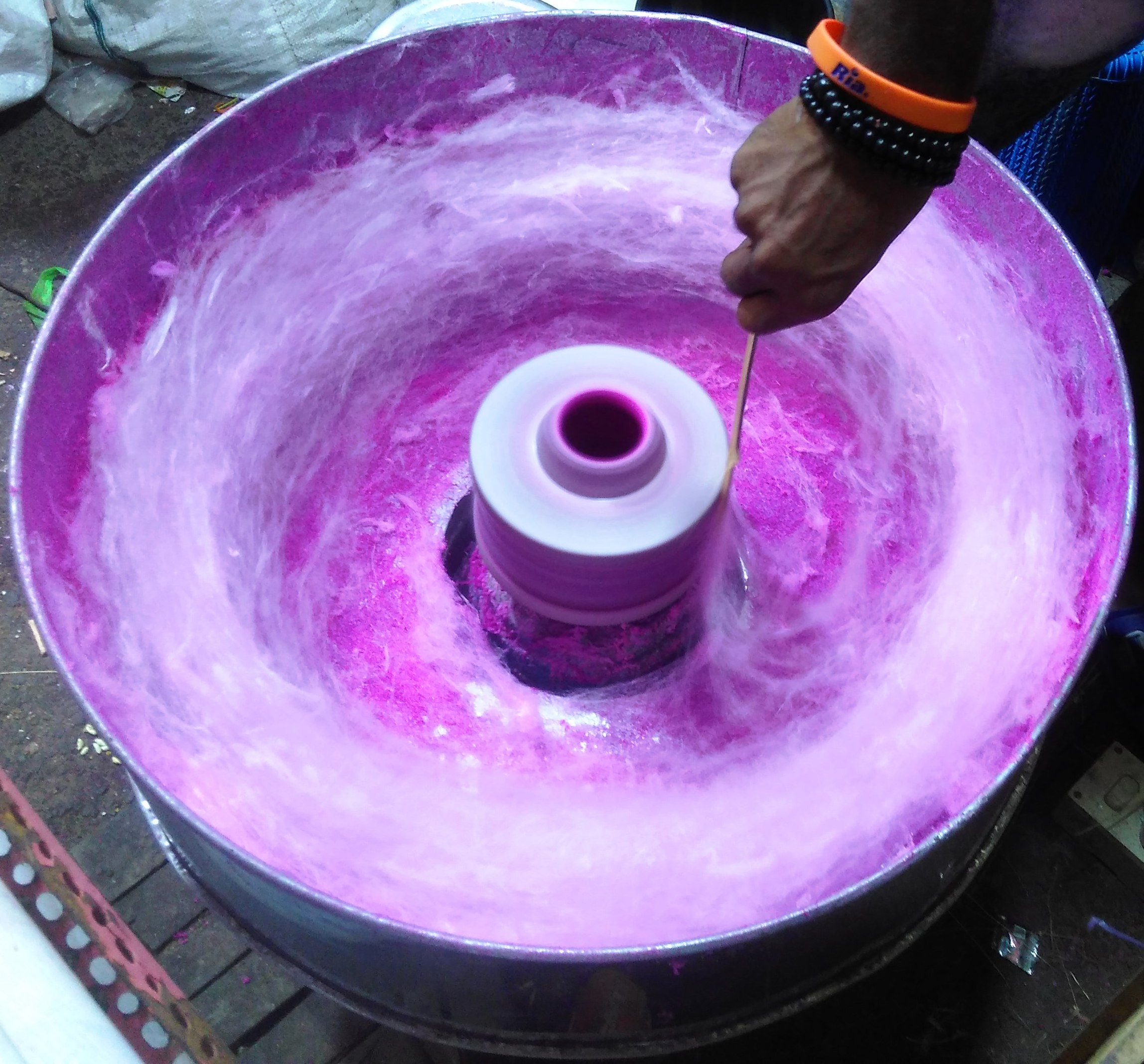
Cotton candy machine

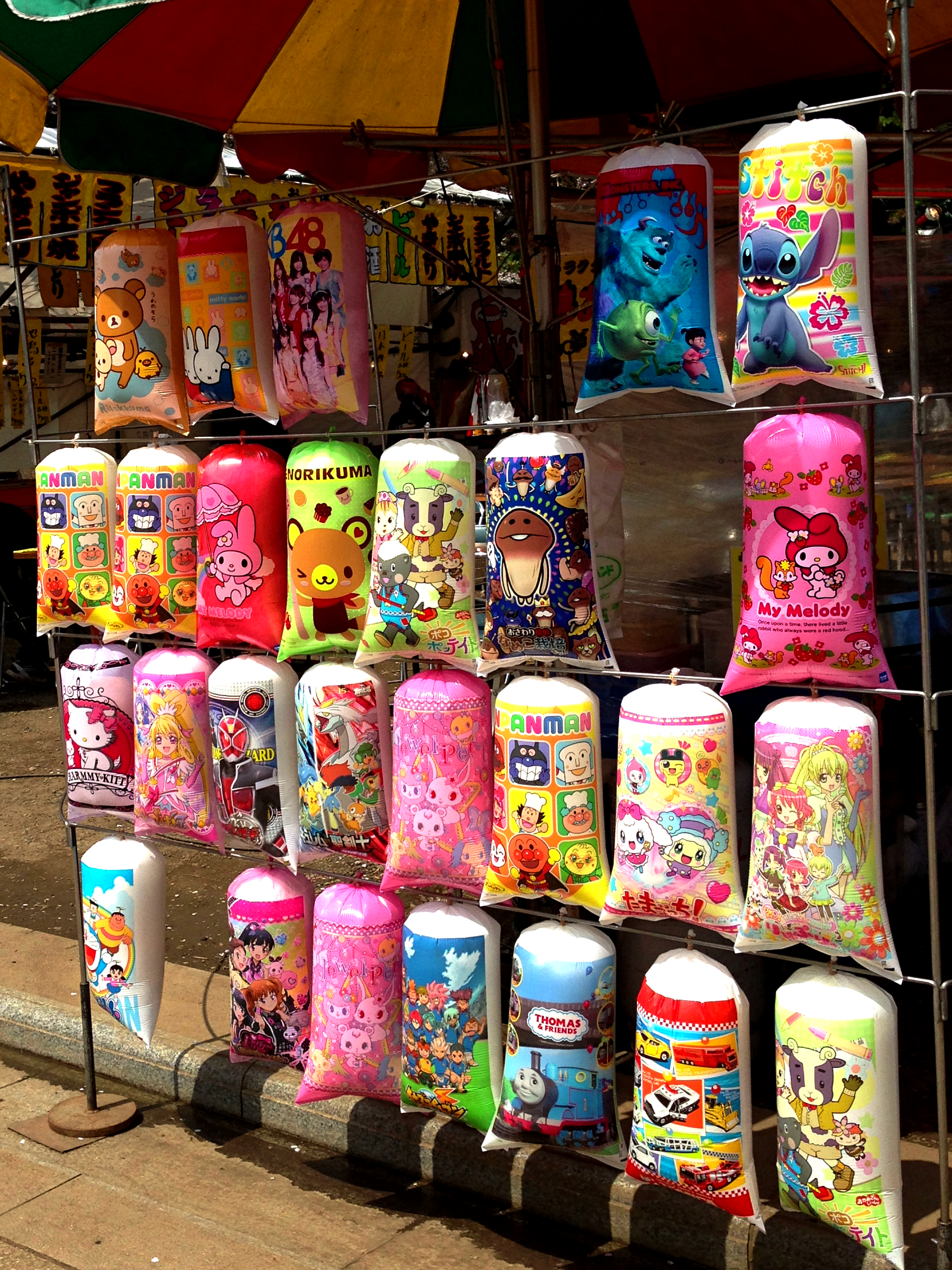
Bags of cotton candy being sold in Japan

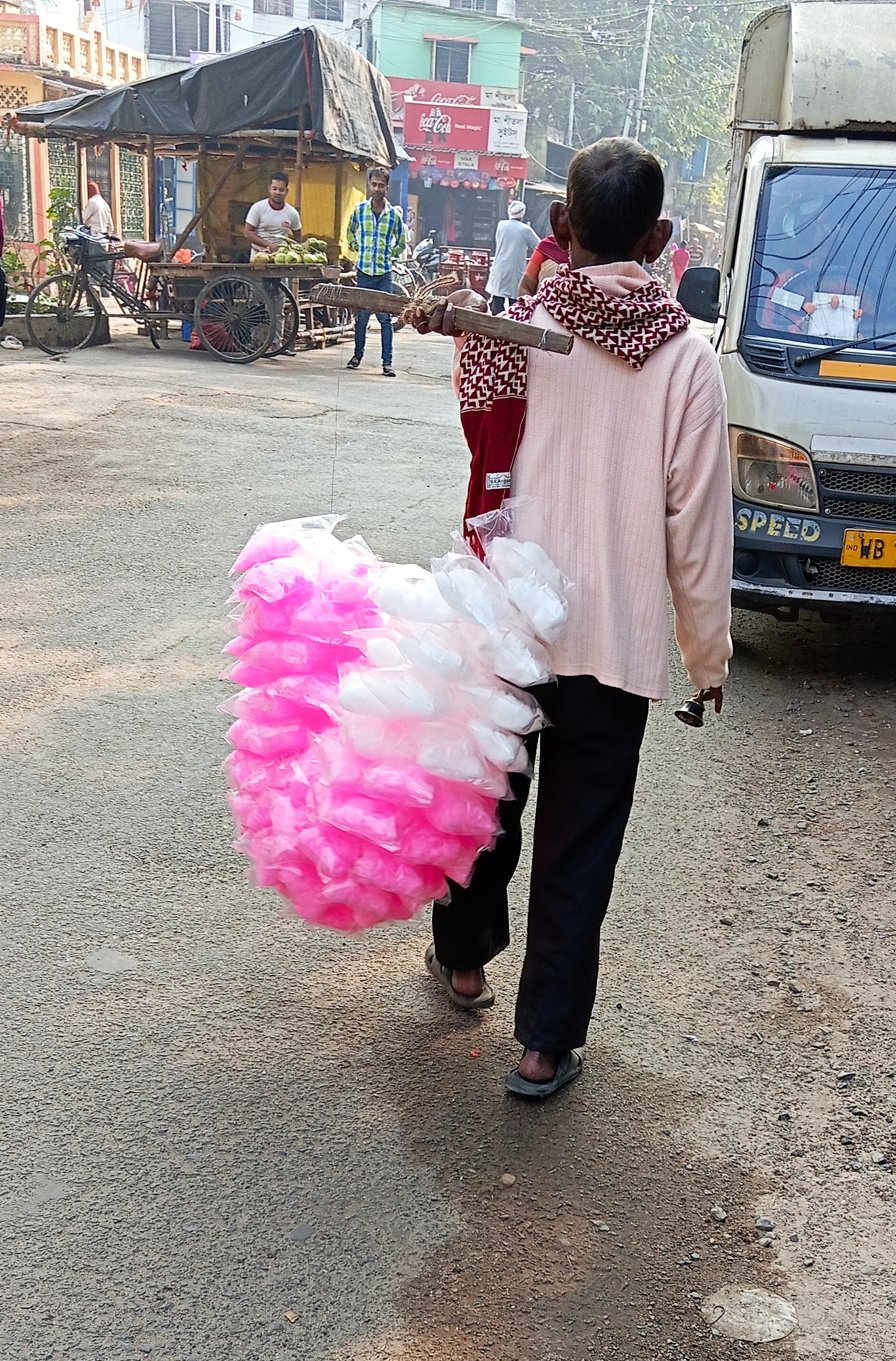
A man selling cotton candy in Kolkata, West Bengal, India

Typical machines used to make cotton candy include a spinning head enclosing a small "sugar reserve" bowl into which a charge of granulated, colored sugar (or separate sugar and food coloring) is poured. Heaters near the rim of the head melt the sugar, which is squeezed out through tiny holes by centrifugal force. Colored sugar packaged specially for the process is milled with melting characteristics and a crystal size optimized for the head and heated holes; granulated sugar used in baking contains fine crystals which spin out unmelted, while rock sugar crystals are too large to properly contact the heater, slowing the production of cotton candy.

The molten sugar solidifies in the air and is caught in a larger bowl which totally surrounds the spinning head. Left to operate for a period, the cotton-like product builds up on the inside walls of the larger bowl, at which point machine operators twirl a stick or cone around the rim of the large catching bowl, gathering the sugar strands into portions which are served on stick or cone, or in plastic bags. As the sugar reserve bowl empties, the operator recharges it with more feedstock. The product is sensitive to humidity, and in humid summer locales, the process can be messy and sticky.

== Flavoring ==
The source material for candy mesh is usually both colored and flavored. When spun, cotton candy is white because it is made from sugar, but adding dye or coloring transforms the color. Originally, cotton candy was just white. In the US, cotton candy is available in a wide variety of flavors, but two flavor-blend colors predominate—blue raspberry and pink vanilla, both originally formulated by the Gold Medal brand (which uses the names "Boo Blue" and "Silly Nilly"). Cotton candy may come out purple when mixed. Cotton candy machines were notoriously unreliable until Gold Medal's invention of a sprung base in 1949—since then, they have manufactured nearly all commercial cotton candy machines and much of the cotton candy in the US.

Typically, once spun, cotton candy is only marketed by color. Absent a clear name other than "blue", the distinctive taste of the blue raspberry flavor mix has gone on to become a compound flavor that some other foods (gum, ice cream, rock candy, fluoride toothpaste) occasionally borrow ("cotton-candy flavored ice cream") to invoke the nostalgia of cotton candy. The sale of blue cotton candy at fairgrounds in the 1950s is one of the first documented instances of blue-raspberry flavoring in America. Pink bubble gum went through a similar transition from specific branded product to a generic flavor that transcended the original confection, and "bubble gum flavor" often shows up in the same product categories as "cotton candy flavor".

== Machines ==
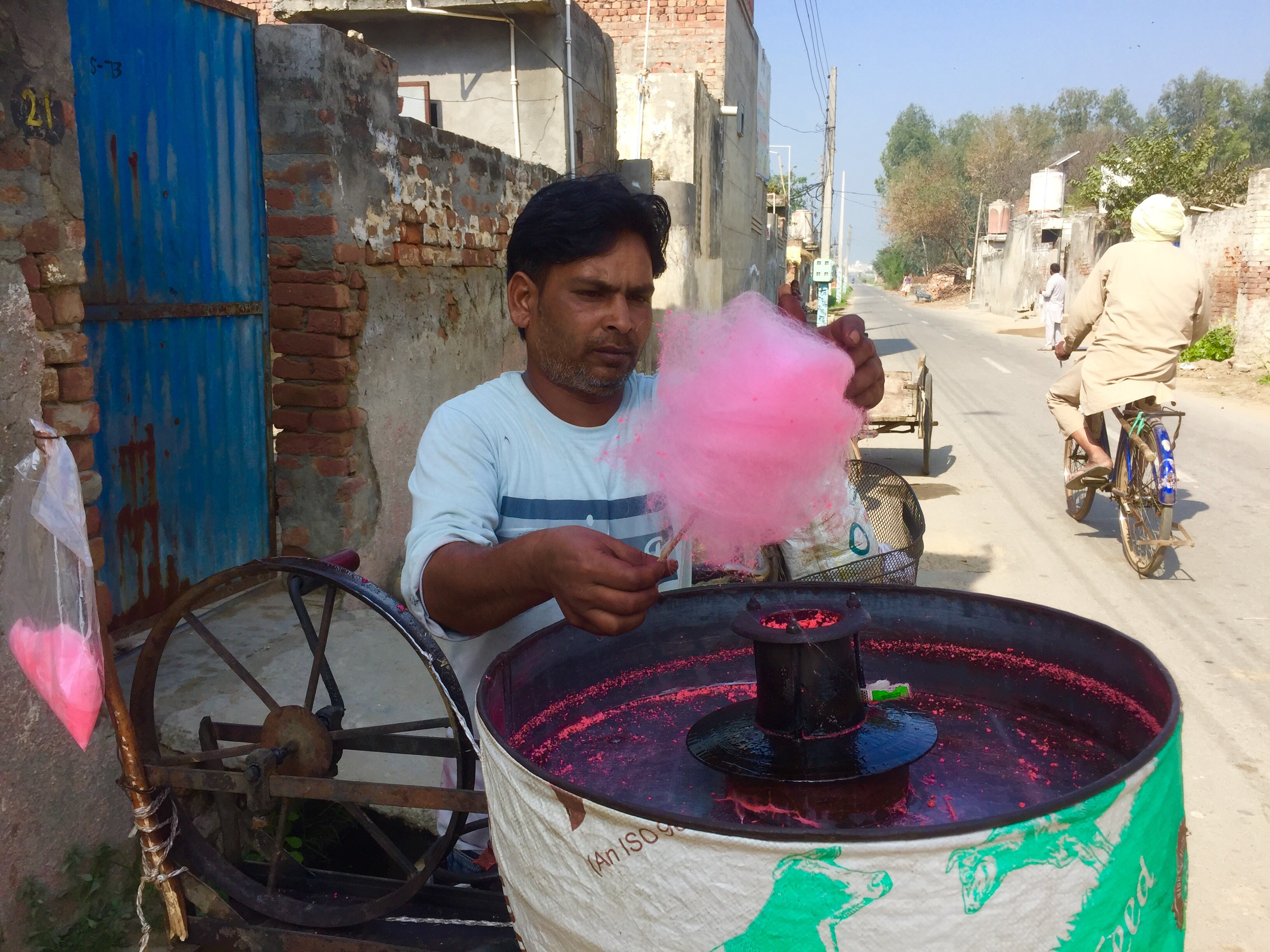
Man makes cotton candy in cotton candy machine, village Bharaj, Sangrur, Punjab, India

In 1978, the first automated machine was used for the production of cotton candy. Since then, many variants have appeared, ranging in size from counter-top to party- and carnival-size. Modern machines for commercial use can hold up to 3 pounds (1.4 kg) of sugar, have storage for extra flavors, and have bowls that spin at 3,450 revolutions per minute.

== Bans ==
In February 2024, the Indian state of Tamil Nadu and the union territory of Puducherry implemented a ban after lab tests confirmed the presence of a cancer-causing substance, rhodamine-B, in samples sent for testing. Andhra Pradesh reportedly started testing samples of the candy while food safety officials in Delhi were pushing for a ban.

Studies have shown that the chemical can increase the risk of cancer and Europe and California have made its use as a food dye illegal.

== See also ==
- Candy making
- Dragon's beard candy
