= Hafiz Sohan Halwa =

Pakistani confectionery

- Main shop (Hussain Agahi Rd), Multan

Restaurant information
- Established: 1963
- Food type: Sohan halwa
- Location: Hussain Agahi Rd, Inner City, Multan, Punjab, Pakistan
- Coordinates: 30°11′40.64″N 71°28′29.63″E
- Website: hafizhalwa.com

Hafiz Sohan Halwa (Urdu: حافظ سوہن حلوہ) is a Pakistani confectionery brand based in Multan, Pakistan which makes Sohan Halwa.

== History ==
Hafiz Sohan Halwa was founded by Hafiz Habib ur Rahman in 1963. The halwa shop from where the business was launched dates back to 1945.

== Products ==
Hafiz Sohan Halwa is described as a pioneer of Multan's Halwa desserts, which are popular throughout Pakistan and exported internationally.
