= Pişmaniye =

Turkish sweet

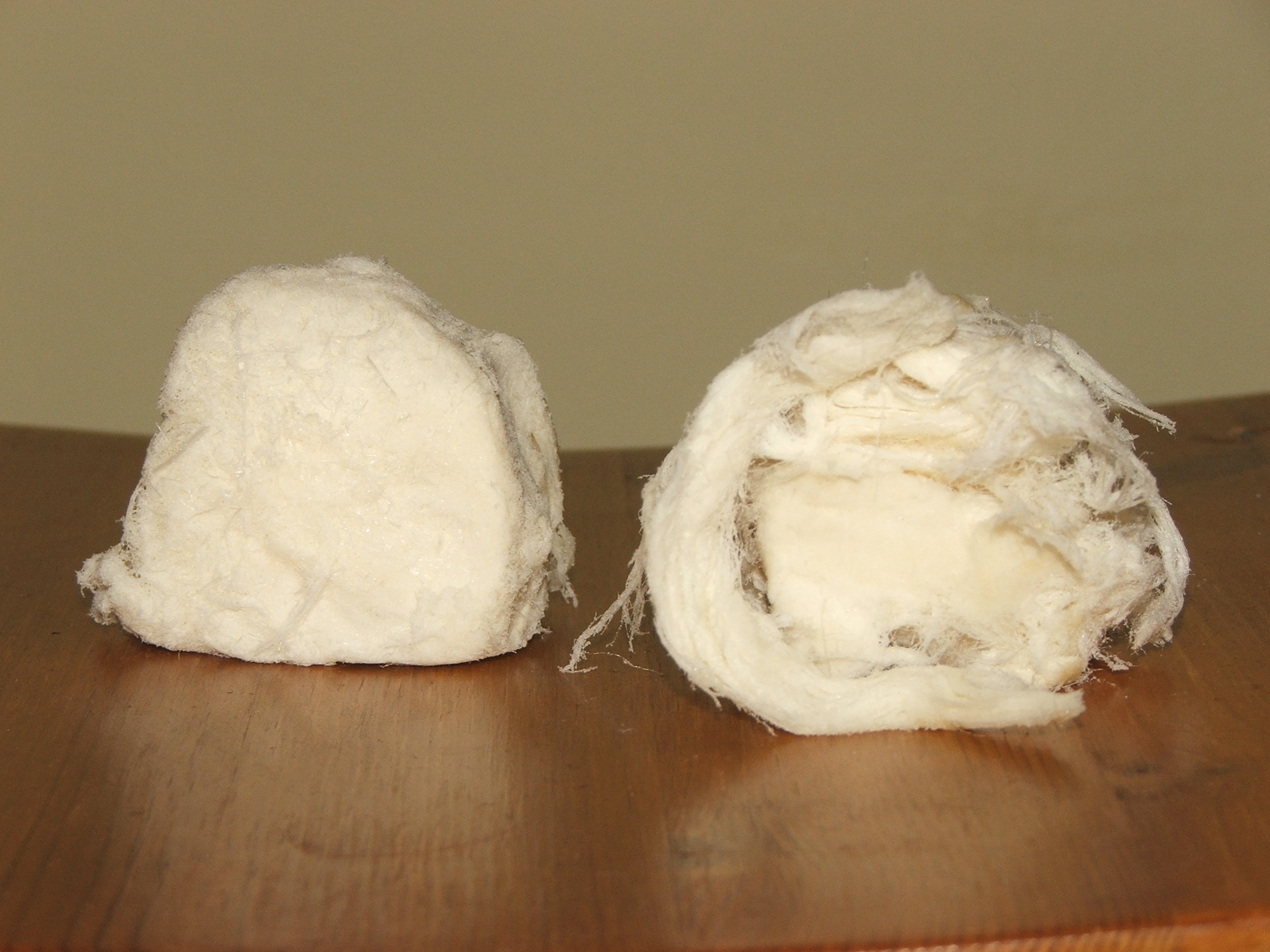
- Alternative names: Tel helva, çekme helva, tel tel, tepme helva, keten helva, Ćetenija
- Type: Dessert
- Place of origin: Turkey
- Region or state: Kocaeli, Turkey
- Main ingredients: Flour, butter, pulled sugar

Pişmaniye is a Turkish confection made by blending flour roasted in butter into pulled sugar and then forming it into fine strands. It is sometimes garnished with ground pistachio nuts. Although it is sometimes compared to cotton candy, both the ingredients and method of preparation are significantly different.

Until recently pişmaniye used to be made at home in most regions of Turkey, but this tradition is now rapidly disappearing. Today the manufacturing process is partially mechanised.

== Alternative names ==
There are many different Turkish names, used in different provinces, the most common being tel helva, çekme helva, tel tel, tepme helva and keten helva, whereas in the Balkans the name ćetenija is commonly used.

== Origin and etymology ==
The earliest Turkish reference to pişmaniye is a recipe by Şirvani, a physician writing during the 1430s. The Persian form pashmak, related to paşmīna and paşm, the origin of the Turkish name pişmaniye, occurs in the poetry of the Iranian poet Ebu Ishak, also known as Bushak (d. 1423 or 1427). "Pashm" in Persian means wool, and "Pashmak" means wool-like.

Another theory is that it may be of a Coptic origin from "ⲡⲏⲥ: pis", which means "to mix flour with fat", and "ⲛⲏⲓⲛⲓ: nani or mani", which means "honey".

This candy is found in Egypt, where it is known as "halawat sha'ar حلاوة شعر", which means "hair candy".

== See also ==
- Sutarfeni
- Soan papdi, a similar Indian sweet
- Pashmak
- Dragon's beard candy
