= Sohan (confectionery) =

Iranian confectionery

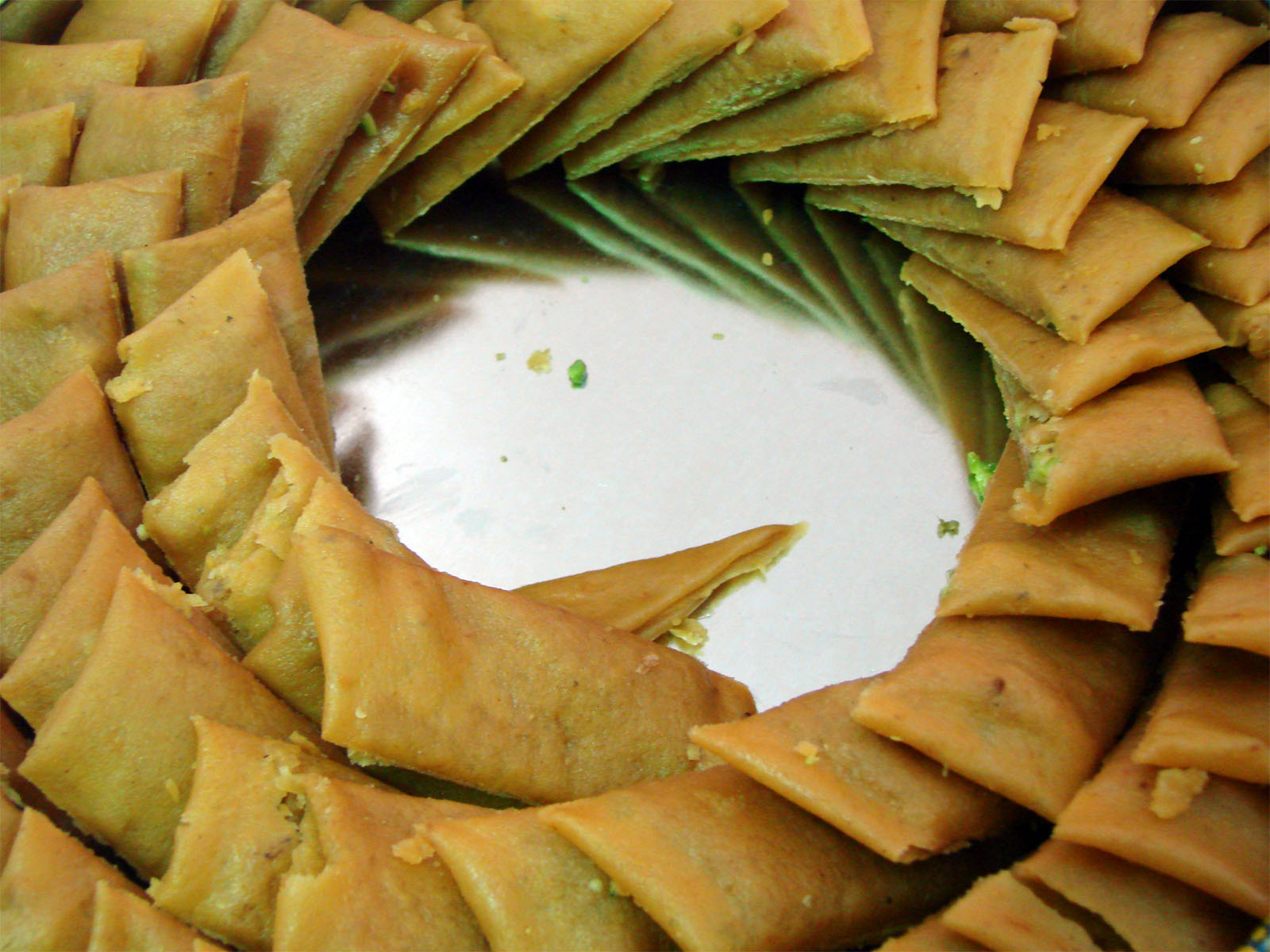
- Type: Halva
- Place of origin: Iran
- Region or state: Qom
- Main ingredients: wheat sprout, flour, egg yolks, rose water, sugar, butter or vegetable oil, saffron, cardamom, almond, pistachio or peanuts

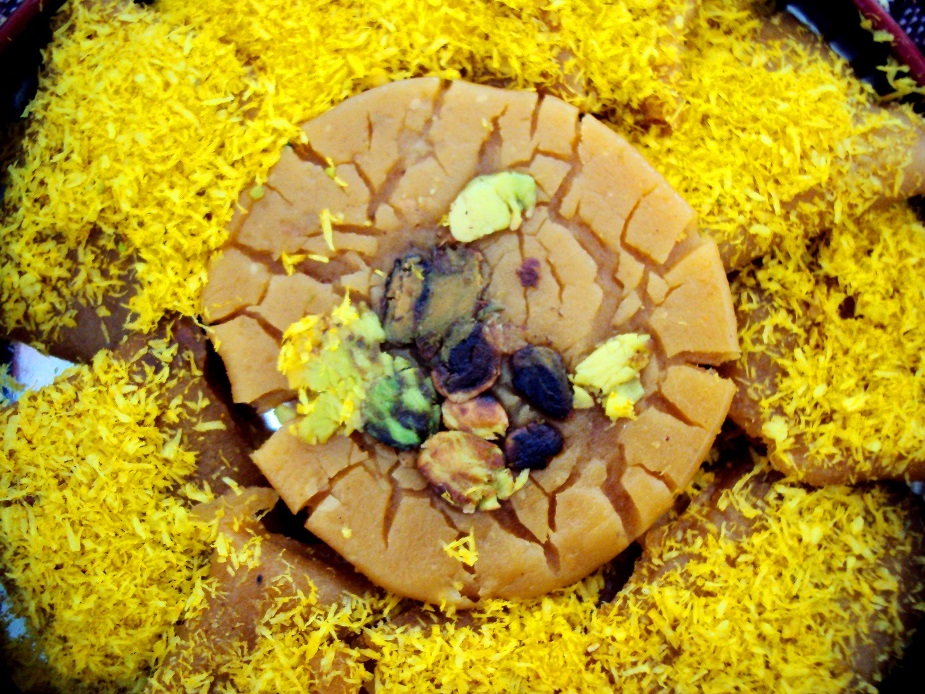
Sohan of Qom

Sohan (Persian: سوهان, romanized: Sôhân) is a traditional Persian saffron brittle toffee made in Iran. Its ingredients consist of wheat sprout, flour, egg yolks, rose water, sugar, butter or vegetable oil, saffron, cardamom, and slivers of almond and pistachio.

== History and variants ==
Sohan originated in Qom, Iran. There are different types of Sohan including Honey Sohan, Sesame Sohan, Sohan Halwa, Almond Sohan, Sohan Gazi, Sohan Loghmeh, Butter Sohan, Sohan Pashmaki (cotton candy) and Dessert Sohan. Some people believe that when Naser al-Din Shah Qajar travelled to Qom and he was entertained with Halwa Qomi, he analogized it to a rasp (Sohan is the Persian word meaning rasp or file) which digested the food he had eaten very well.

== See also ==
- Sohan papdi
- Shekarpareh
- Sohan halwa
- Sohan asali
- Peanut brittle
- Florentine biscuit
