= Pashmak =

Iranian cotton candy

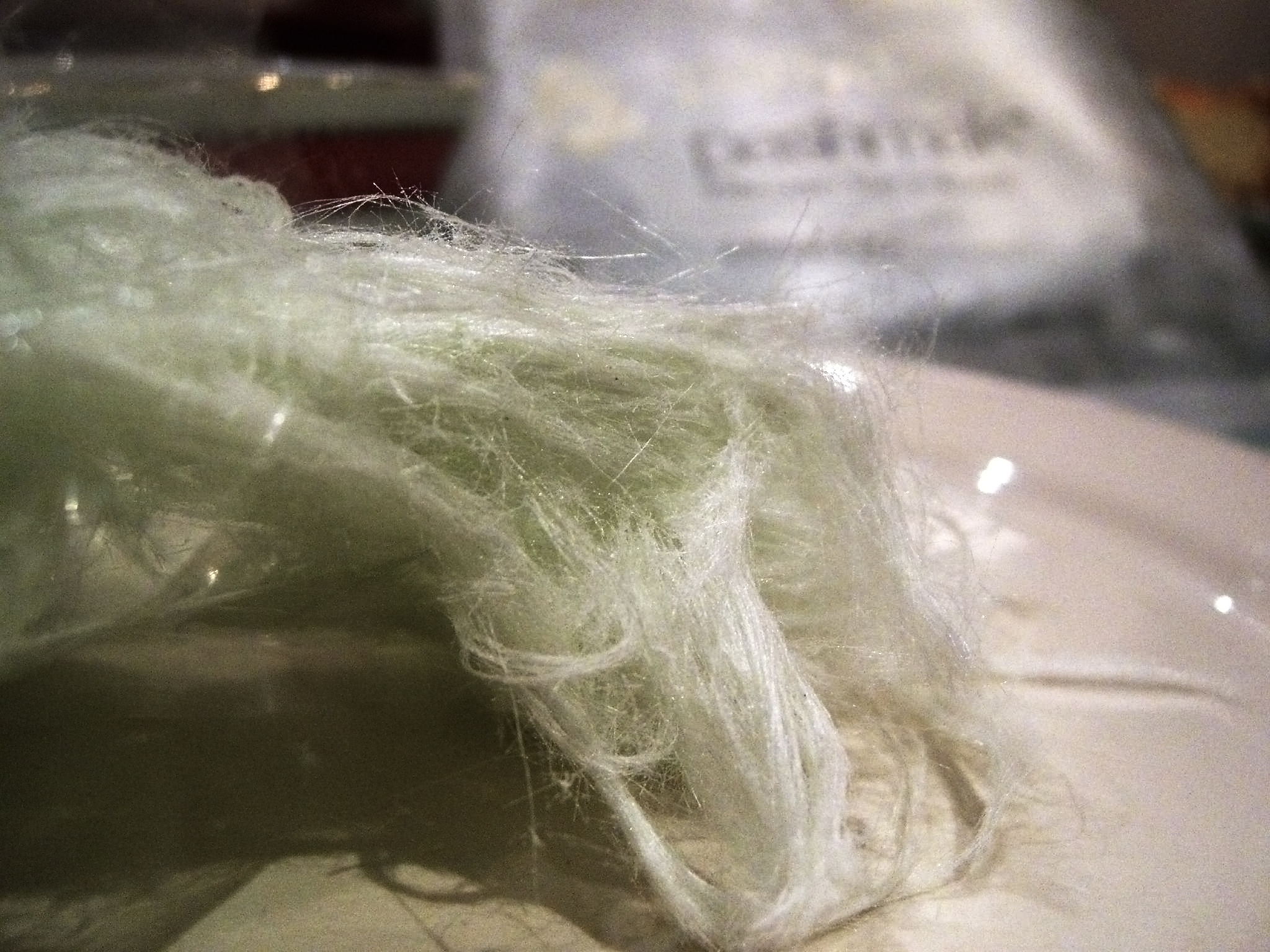
- Alternative names: Iranian cotton candy
- Type: Cotton candy
- Place of origin: Iran
- Region or state: Yazd
- Main ingredients: Sugar, sesame

Pashmak (Persian: پشمک) is a form of Iranian candy floss or cotton candy, made from sugar. Pashmak is served on its own or as an accompaniment to fruits, cakes, ice creams, puddings and desserts. It is widely known as Persian cotton candy. It is sometimes garnished with ground pistachio nuts. Although the texture is similar to cotton candy, both method and ingredients are different.

Pashmak originated in the Iranian city of Yazd known for its various traditional Persian sweets such as Baghlava, Qottab, and Gaz during Safavid Empire.

== Similar sweets ==
A Turkish sweet called pişmaniye bears some resemblance to pashmak.

In Afghanistan, a similar sweet is called qandi pashmak.

== See also ==
- Dragon's beard candy — a Chinese variant
