= Kkul-tarae =

Korean variant of dragon's beard candy

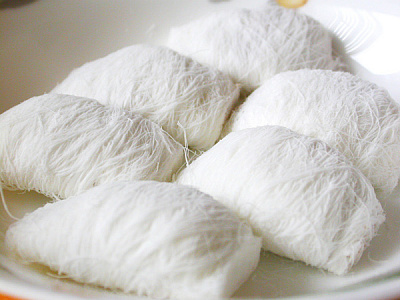
- Korean court cake
- Alternative names: King's Candy
- Course: Dessert
- Place of origin: China
- Main ingredients: Honey
- Similar dishes: Dragon's beard candy

Korean name
- Hangul: 꿀타래
- Lit.: honey skein
- RR: kkultarae
- MR: kkult'arae
- IPA: [k͈ul.tʰa.ɾɛ]

Kkul-tarae (Korean: 꿀타래; lit. '"honey skein"') is a Korean dessert based on the Chinese dragon's beard candy.

== Cooking method ==
A hard dough of honey-maltose mixture is kneaded, twisted, stretched and pulled into skeins of silky threads, in which assorted candied nuts, chocolate, or other fillings are wrapped.

== History ==
The dragon's beard candy was never considered a traditional Korean candy and was first introduced to South Korea from China in the 1990s. Its original name was yongsuyeom (용수염), a direct translation of the Chinese name "dragon's beard" (龙须糖). The first line of stores that opened in Seoul who marketed it as kkul-tarae were inspired from the dragon's beard candy that was sold in Chinese hotels. Despite initially revealing its Chinese origins explicitly, the Korean brands later changed their marketing strategy by attributing a fake history for the dessert, claiming it as a traditional Korean dessert enjoyed by the royal court with a 500 year old history. This marketing was later disseminated in news outlets, contributing to the public perception of the dessert being a traditional Korean dessert. The name kkul-tarae was trademarked 7 November 2000 with intent to sell dessert similar to dragon's beard candy in Korea.

== See also ==
- List of Korean desserts
