= Fried rice =

Asian rice dish

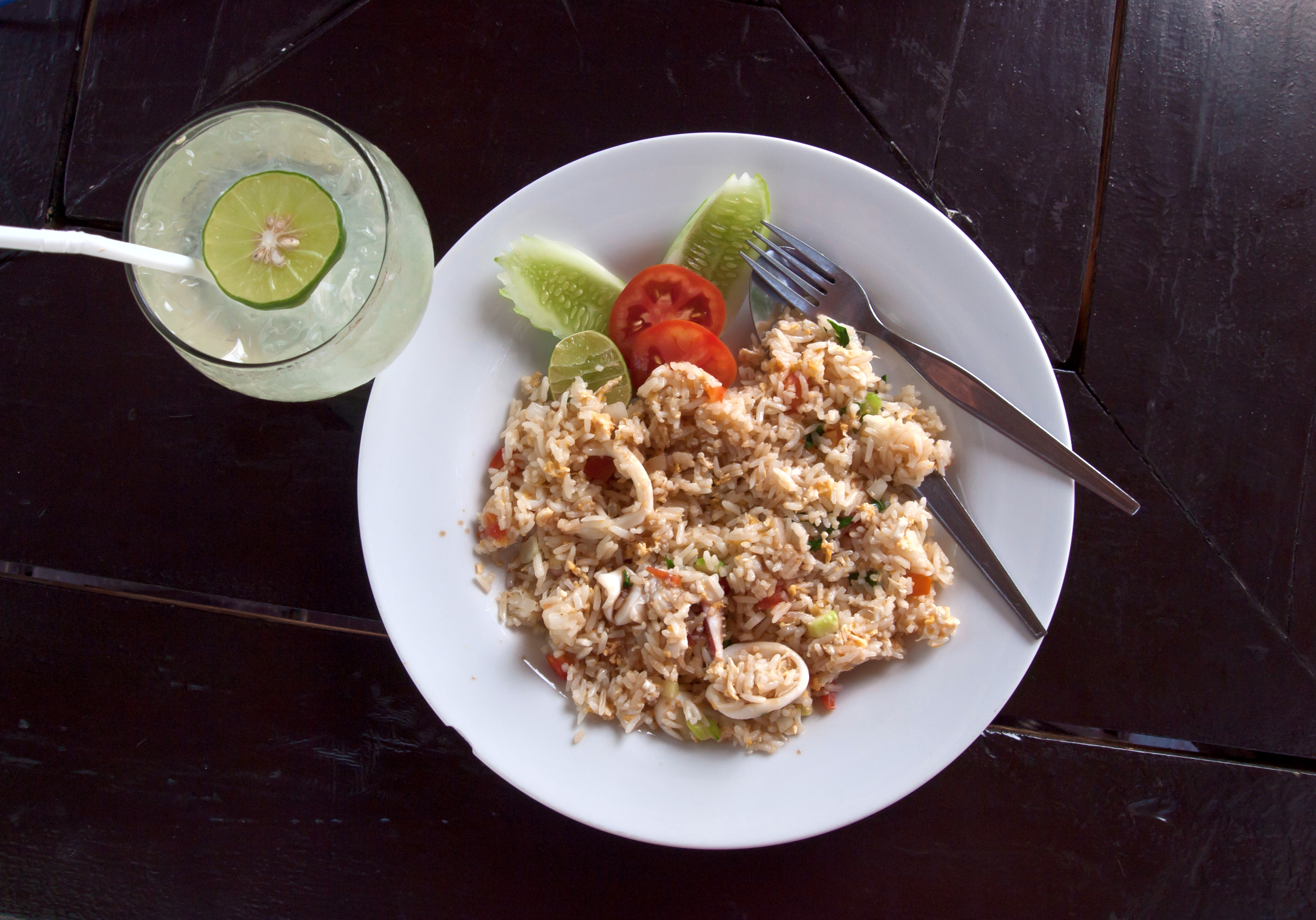
- Thai-style seafood fried rice
- Alternative names: List: arroz mamposteao – Puerto Rican Spanish; arroz frito – Philippine Spanish; bai cha (បាយឆា) – Khmer; bokkeum-bap (볶음밥) – Korean; bhuteko bhat (भुटेको भात) – Nepalese; yakimeshi (焼飯) – Japanese; chǎofàn (炒饭^{(s)}; 炒飯^{(t)}) – Chinese; chaulafan – Ecuadorian Spanish; chaufa – Peruvian Spanish; cơm chiên, cơm rang – Vietnamese; htamin gyaw (ထမင်းကြော်) – Burmese; khao pad (ข้าวผัด) – Thai; nasi goreng – Malay/Indonesian; sinangág – Tagalog; sinanlag – Cebuano; singlé násî – Kapampangan
- Type: Rice dish
- Course: Main course
- Place of origin: China
- Region or state: Worldwide
- Main ingredients: Cooked rice, cooking oil
- Variations: Bokkeum-bap; Chāhan; Chǎo fàn Khao phat Nasi goreng

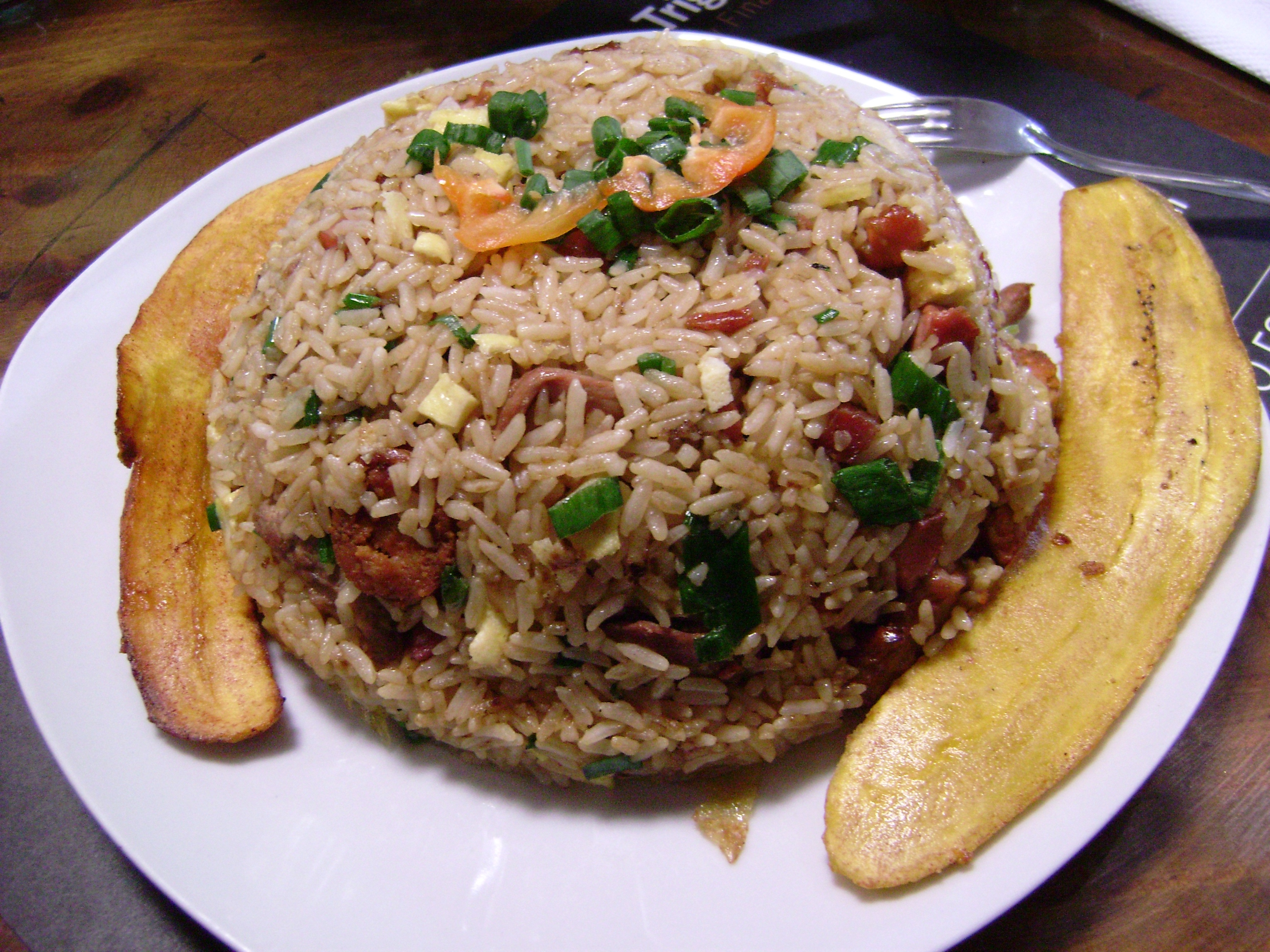
Arroz chaufa, Peruvian-Chinese fried rice

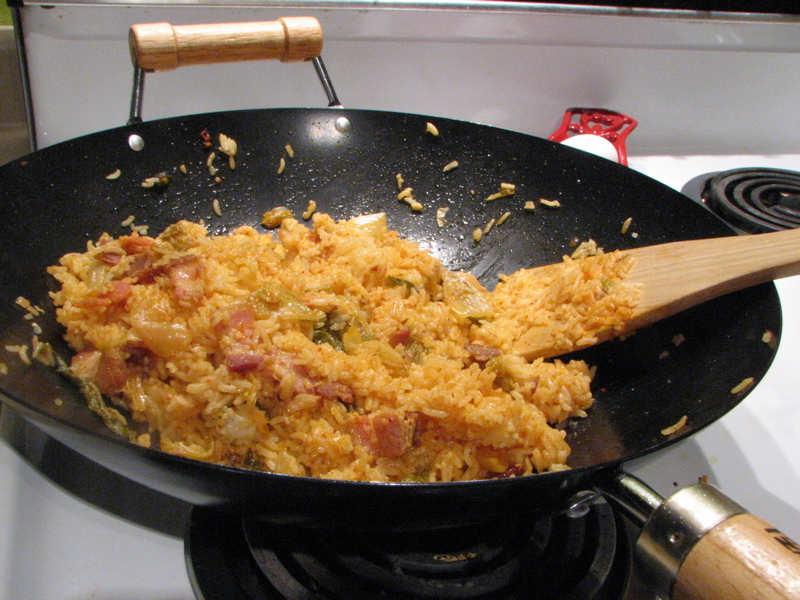
Korean kimchi-bokkeum-bap

Fried rice is a dish of cooked rice that has been stir-fried in a wok or a frying pan and is usually mixed with other ingredients such as eggs, vegetables, seafood, or meat. It is often eaten as a main dish or as an accompaniment to another dish. Fried rice is a popular component of East Asian, Southeast Asian, South Asian and American Chinese cuisines. As a homemade dish, fried rice is typically made with ingredients left over from other dishes, leading to countless variations. Fried rice first developed during the Sui dynasty in China and later spread across the world through the migration of the Chinese diaspora.

Many varieties of fried rice have their own specific list of ingredients. In China, common varieties include Yangzhou fried rice and Hokkien fried rice. Japanese chāhan is considered a Japanese Chinese dish, having derived from Chinese fried rice dishes. In Southeast Asia, similarly constructed Indonesian, Malaysian, and Singaporean nasi goreng and Thai khao phat are popular dishes. In the West, most restaurants catering to vegetarians have invented their own varieties of fried rice, including egg fried rice. Fried rice is also seen on the menus of non-Asian countries’ restaurants offering cuisines with no native tradition of the dish. Additionally, the cuisine of some Latin American countries includes variations on fried rice, including Ecuadorian chaulafan, Peruvian arroz chaufa, Cuban arroz frito, and Puerto Rican arroz mampostea(d)o.

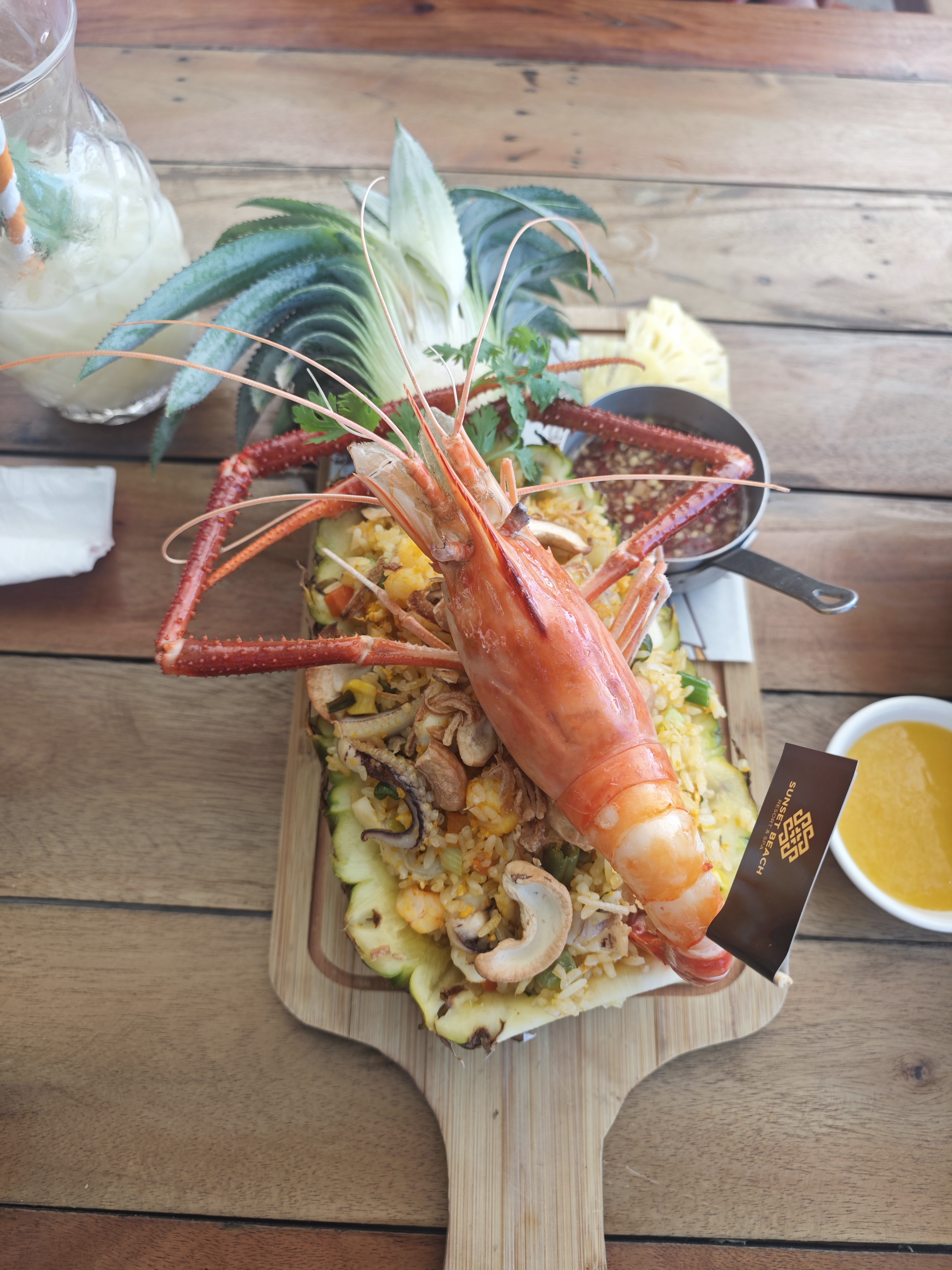
Fried rice served in a pineapple

Fried rice is a common street food in Asia and other parts of the world. In some Asian countries, small restaurants, street vendors and traveling hawkers specialise in serving fried rice. In Bhutanese cities it is common to find fried rice street vendors stationing their food carts in busy streets or residential areas. Many Southeast Asian street food stands offer fried rice with a selection of optional garnishes and side dishes.

== Preparation ==
Video depicting preparation of Chinese fried rice

Cooked rice is the primary ingredient, with a wide variety of additional ingredients, such as vegetables, eggs, meat (chicken, beef, pork, lamb, mutton), preserved meat (bacon, ham, sausage), seafood (fish, shrimp, crab), and mushrooms. Aromatics, such as onions, shallots, scallions, leeks, ginger and garlic, are often added for extra flavor. Cooking oils, such as vegetable oil, sesame oil, clarified butter, or lard, can be used to grease the wok or frying pan to prevent sticking, as well as for flavor. Fried rice dishes can be seasoned with salt, different types of soy sauce, oyster sauce, teriyaki sauce and many other sauces and spices. Popular garnishes include chopped scallions, sliced chili, fried shallots, sprigs of parsley or coriander leaves, mint leaves, sliced boiled eggs, toasted sesame seeds, seaweed flakes (gim or nori), sliced cucumber, tomato, lime, or pickled vegetables.

Making fried rice with fresh rice can prevent it from frying properly, leading to an undesirably soft texture.

== History ==
=== Origins in China ===
The earliest record of fried rice is in the Sui dynasty (589–618 AD) in China, particularly in the city of Yangzhou. It was developed as a practical solution for using leftover rice, which would otherwise harden after cooling. By stir-frying day-old rice with oil, eggs, vegetables and small amounts of meat, households were able to create a new dish that was both flavourful and economical.

The technique of stir-frying, known in Chinese as chǎo, was already a central feature of Chinese cooking. By the early medieval period, stir-frying had become one of the most versatile methods of preparing quick meals, allowing ingredients to be cooked evenly and seasoned efficiently in a hot wok. Fried rice thus fit seamlessly into the established culinary repertoire, eventually becoming a common staple in many Chinese regional cuisines.

Over time, different variations of fried rice developed within China, particularly in southern regions such as Fujian and Guangdong, where rice was the dominant staple. These southern styles would later influence the kinds of fried rice that spread abroad through migration and trade, laying the foundation for adaptations in Southeast Asia.

=== Localisation ===
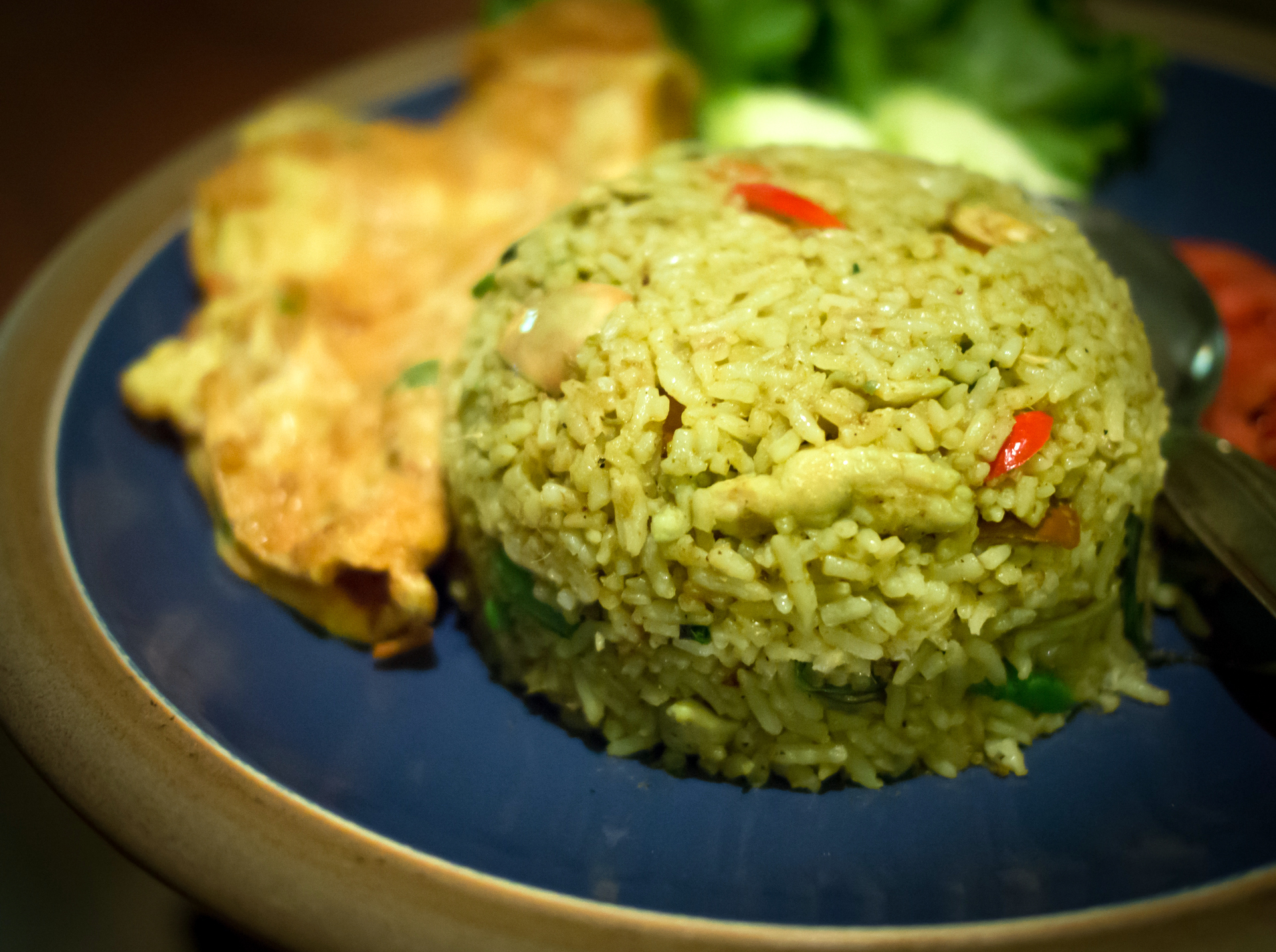
Thai Khao phat

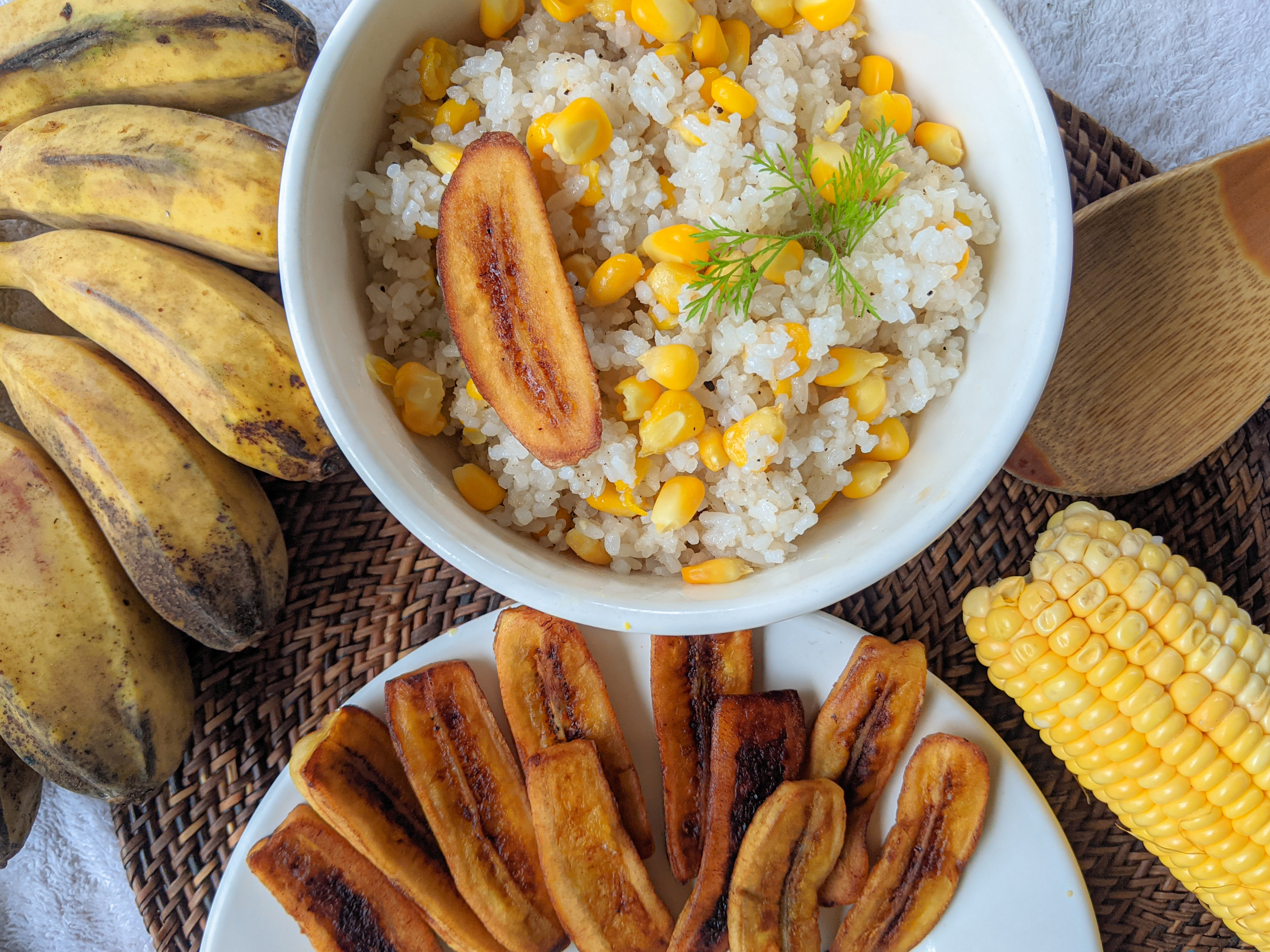
Filipino Sinangag

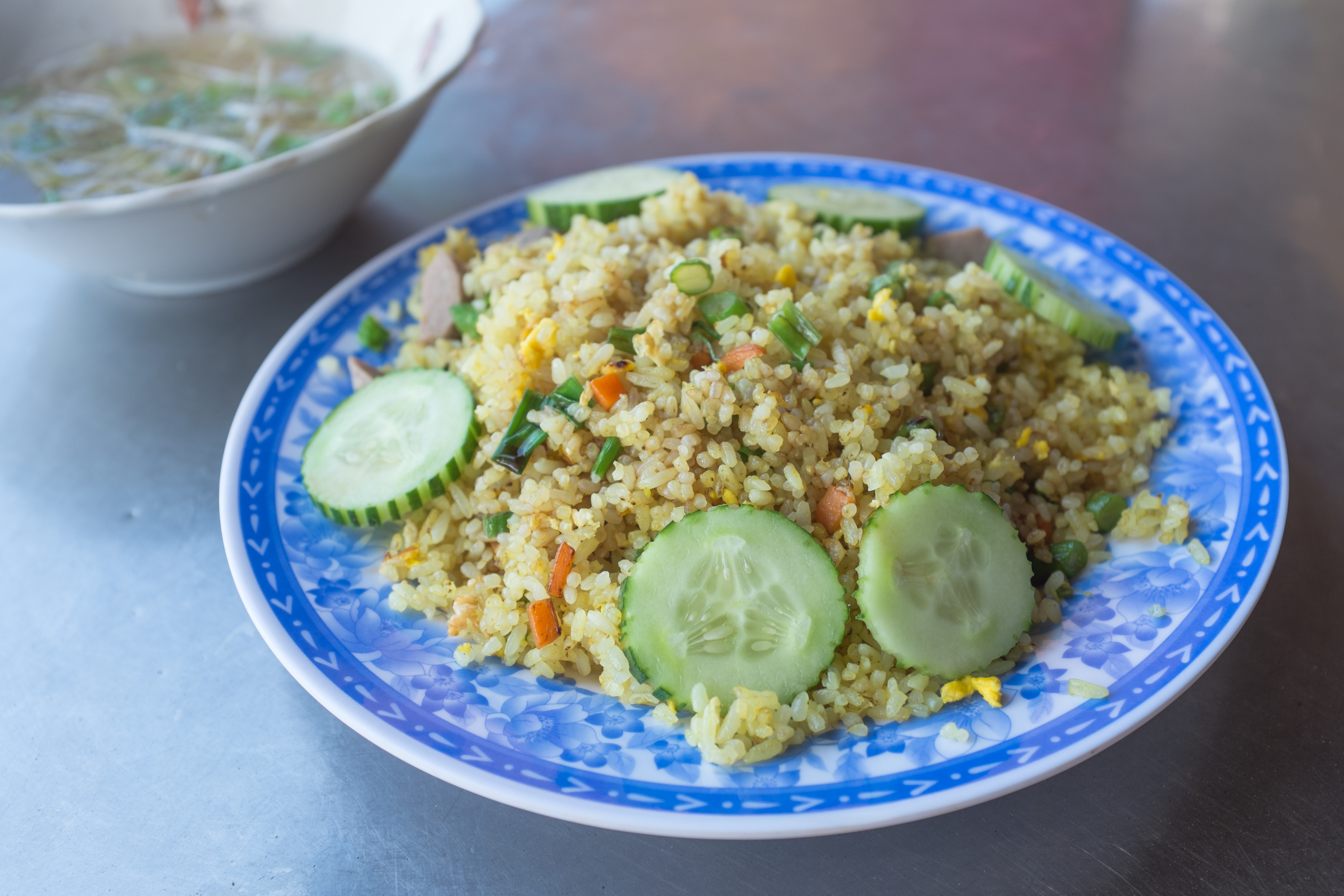
Vietnamese Cơm Chiên

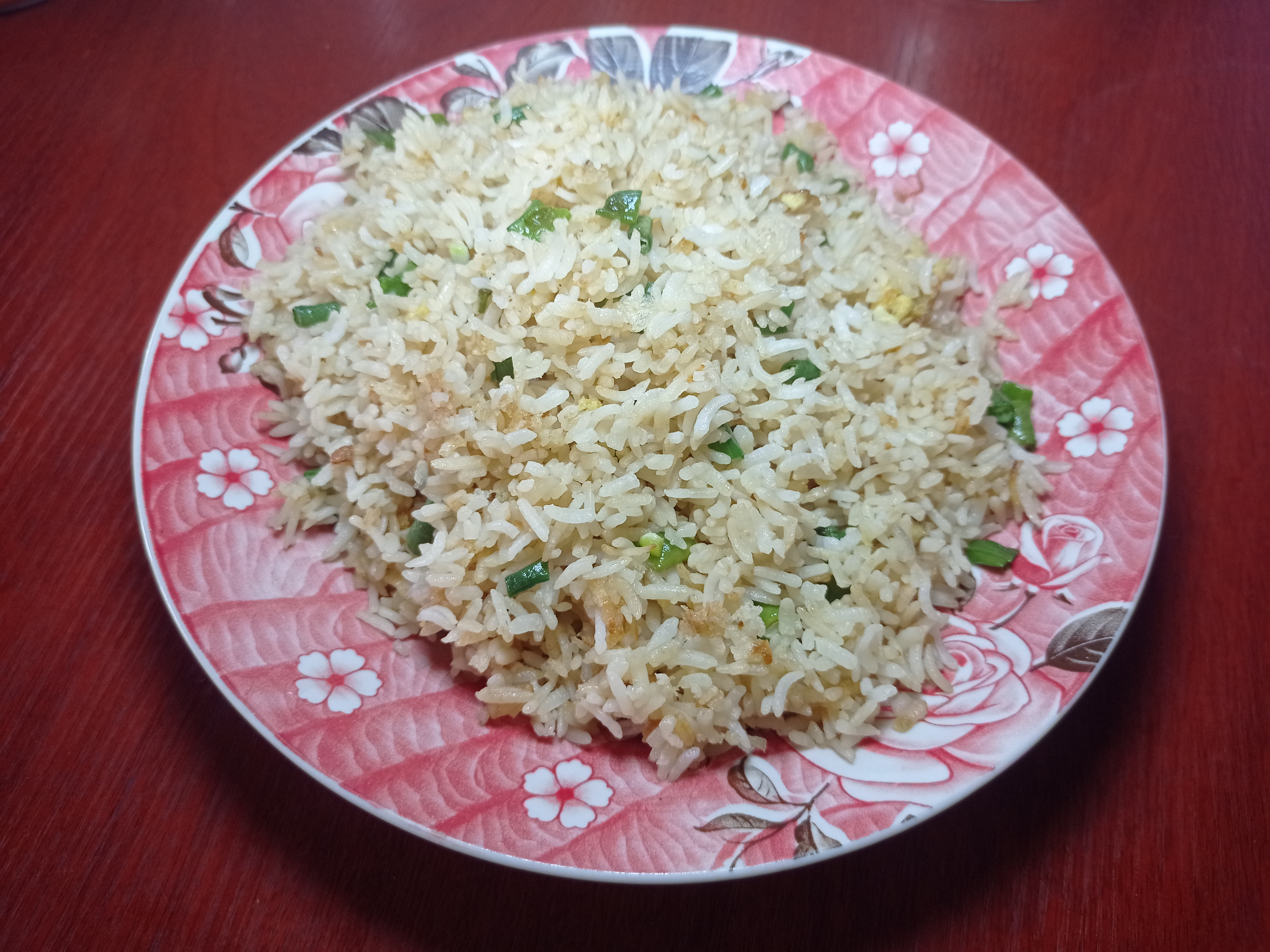
Burmese htamin gyaw

Regional adaptations of fried rice across Southeast Asia, illustrating Chinese culinary influence and localised development.

As fried rice spread across South-East Asia, it was gradually localised into distinctive regional styles. Within the Malay Archipelago, it evolved into nasi goreng, which diverged from its Chinese antecedent through the use of local flavourings. Seasonings such as kecap manis (sweet soy sauce), sambal, terasi or belacan (shrimp paste), shallots and garlic gave the dish a darker colour, more pronounced aroma and a balance of sweet, savoury and spicy flavours. Variants developed in present-day Indonesia, Malaysia, Singapore, Brunei and southern Thailand, each incorporating regional ingredients and tastes while sharing a common identity under the name nasi goreng.

Elsewhere in South-East Asia, parallel adaptations developed. In Thailand, fried rice became khao phat, seasoned with fish sauce and served with accompaniments such as lime and cucumber. In the Philippines, it appeared as sinangag, a garlic-based fried rice commonly eaten at breakfast alongside eggs and cured meats. In Vietnam, cơm chiên often featured Chinese sausage and local herbs. While each variation reflected local tastes, in Indonesia and Malaysia nasi goreng became the most widespread and distinctive form, cutting across ethnic and social boundaries.

== Varieties ==
=== East Asia ===
==== China ====
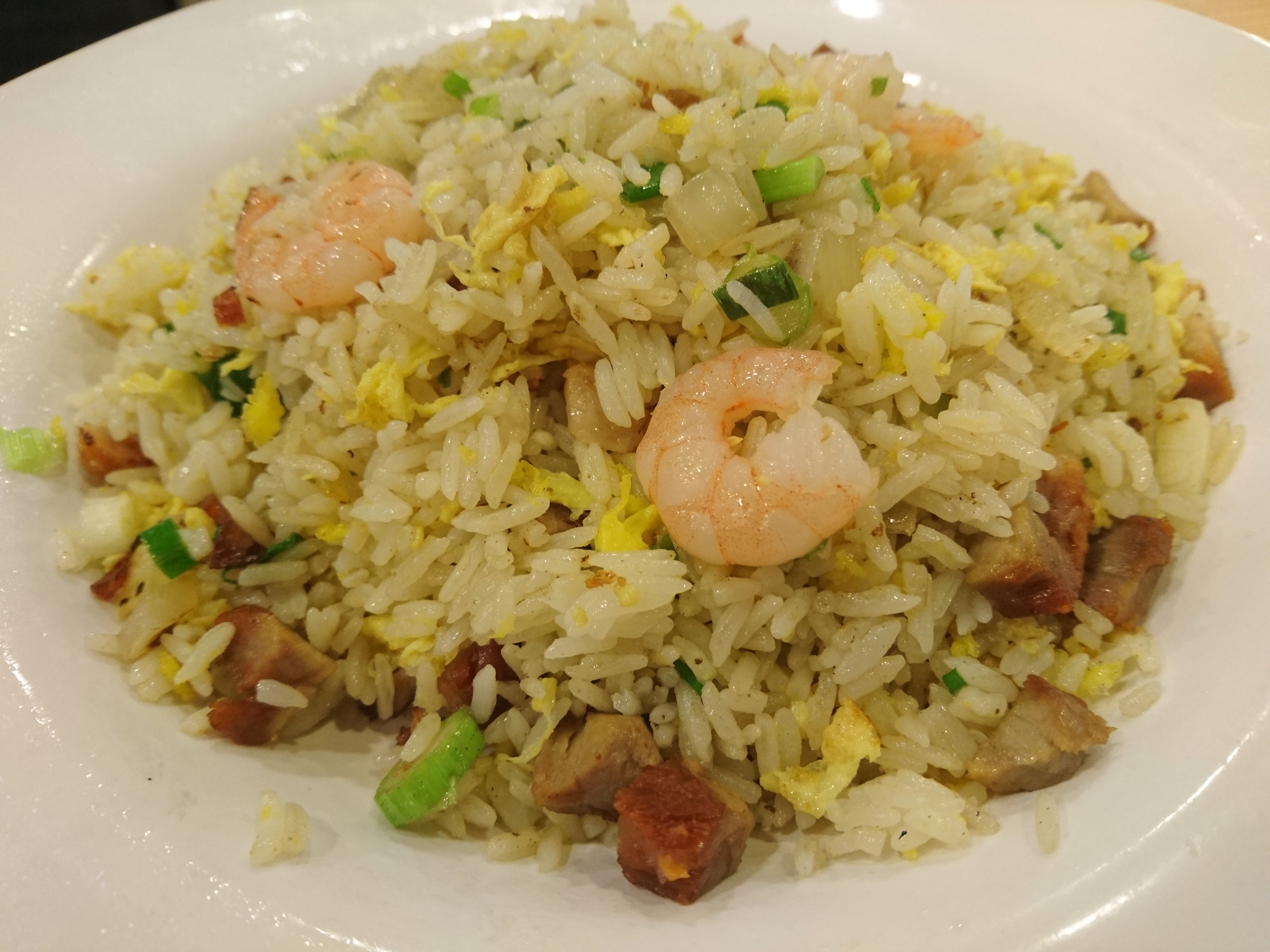
Yángzhōu chǎofàn in Hong Kong, the most popular Chinese fried rice

- Hokkien (or Fujian) fried rice (福建炒飯), a variation of Chinese fried rice, is from the Fujian region of China; it has a thick sauce poured and mixed over it which can include mushrooms, meat, vegetables, and other ingredients.
- Sichuan fried rice (四川炒飯) is a spicy stir-fried rice from Sichuan which uses doubanjiang chili sauce with garlic, green onions, and red onion.
- Yin-yang fried rice (鴛鴦炒飯) is topped with two different types of sauce, typically a savory white sauce on one half and a red tomato-based sauce on the other half. Elaborate versions use the sauces to create a yin-yang symbol.
- Yeungchow (or Yangzhou) fried rice (揚州炒飯) consists of generous portions of shrimp and scrambled egg, along with barbecued pork. This is the most popular fried rice served in Chinese restaurants, commonly referred to simply as "special fried rice" or "house fried rice".

==== Japan ====
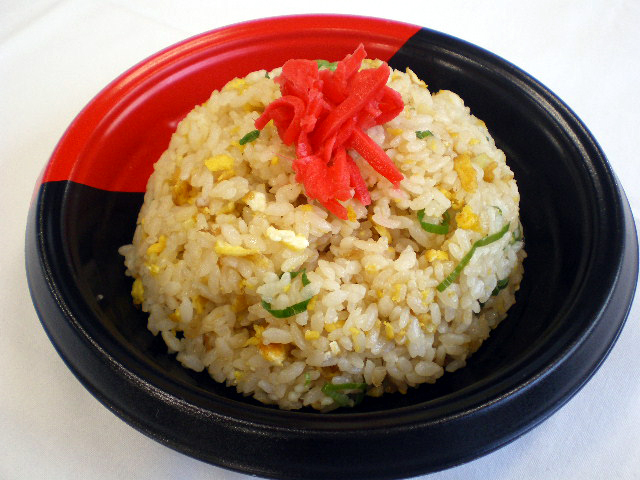
Chāhan, Japanese-Chinese fried rice

- Chāhan (チャーハン) or yakimeshi (焼飯) is a Chinese-derived fried rice suited to Japanese tastes by the addition of katsuobushi for flavor, prepared with a variety of ingredients.
- Omurice is fried rice wrapped inside an egg omelette. The fried rice is generally mixed with a variety of vegetables and meat. Often a variant called "chicken rice" (チキンライス chikinraisu) is used. Ketchup or some other tomato sauce is added to make this.

==== Korea ====
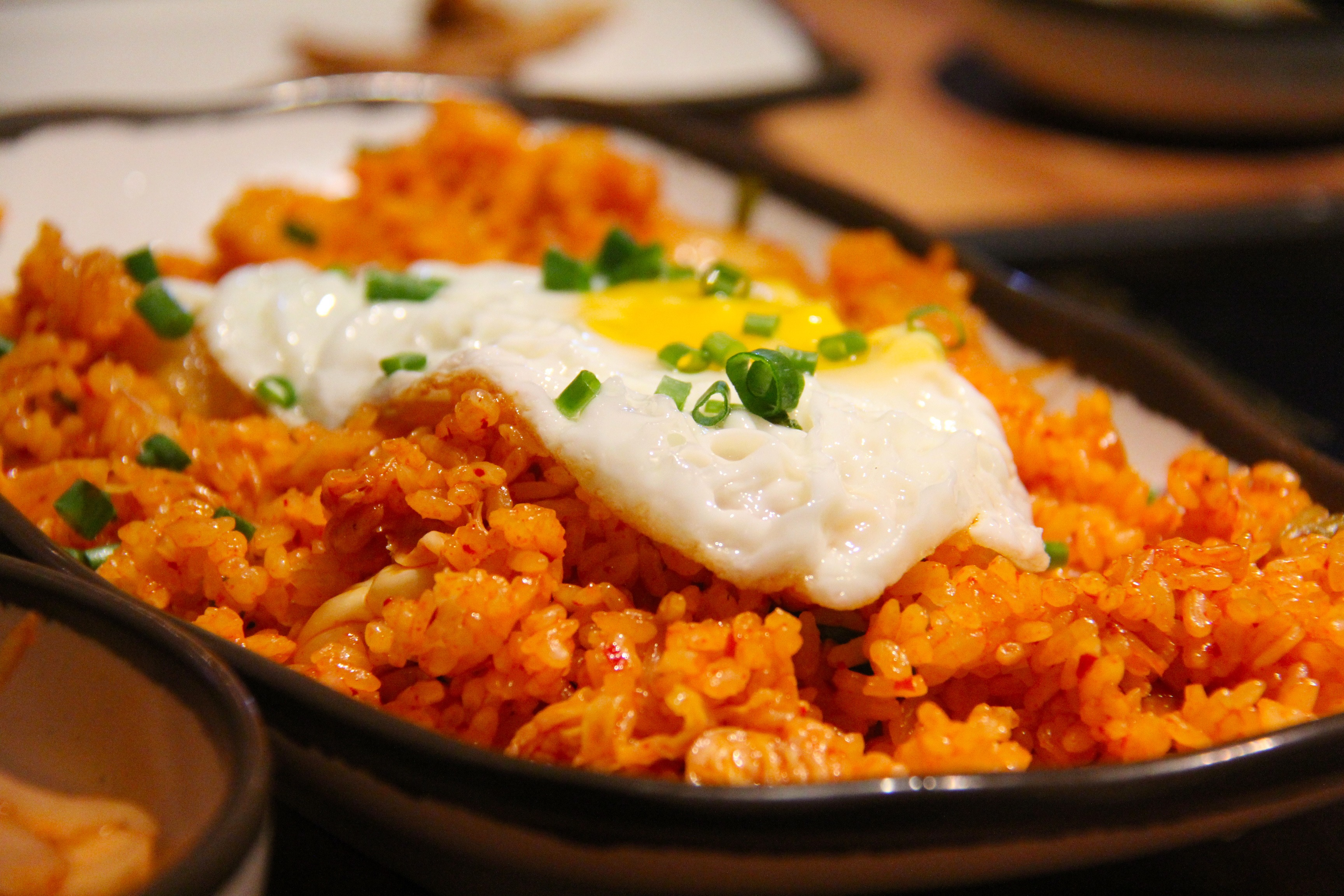
Kimchi-bokkeum-bap

- Bokkeum-bap (볶음밥; lit. '"fried rice"') is made by stir-frying bap (cooked rice) with other ingredients in oil. A wide range of fried rice dishes are common in Korean cuisine, often made with whichever ingredients are handy. In Korean restaurants, fried rice is a popular end-of-meal add-on. After eating the main dishes cooked on a tabletop stove, cooked rice along with gimgaru (seaweed flakes) and sesame oil is often added directly into the remains of the main dishes, stir-fried, and browned.
  - Kimchi-bokkeum-bap (김치볶음밥; lit. '"kimchi fried rice"') is a popular variety of bokkeum-bap, prepared with kimchi and a variable list of other ingredients.

=== Southeast Asia ===
==== Brunei, Indonesia, Malaysia and Singapore ====
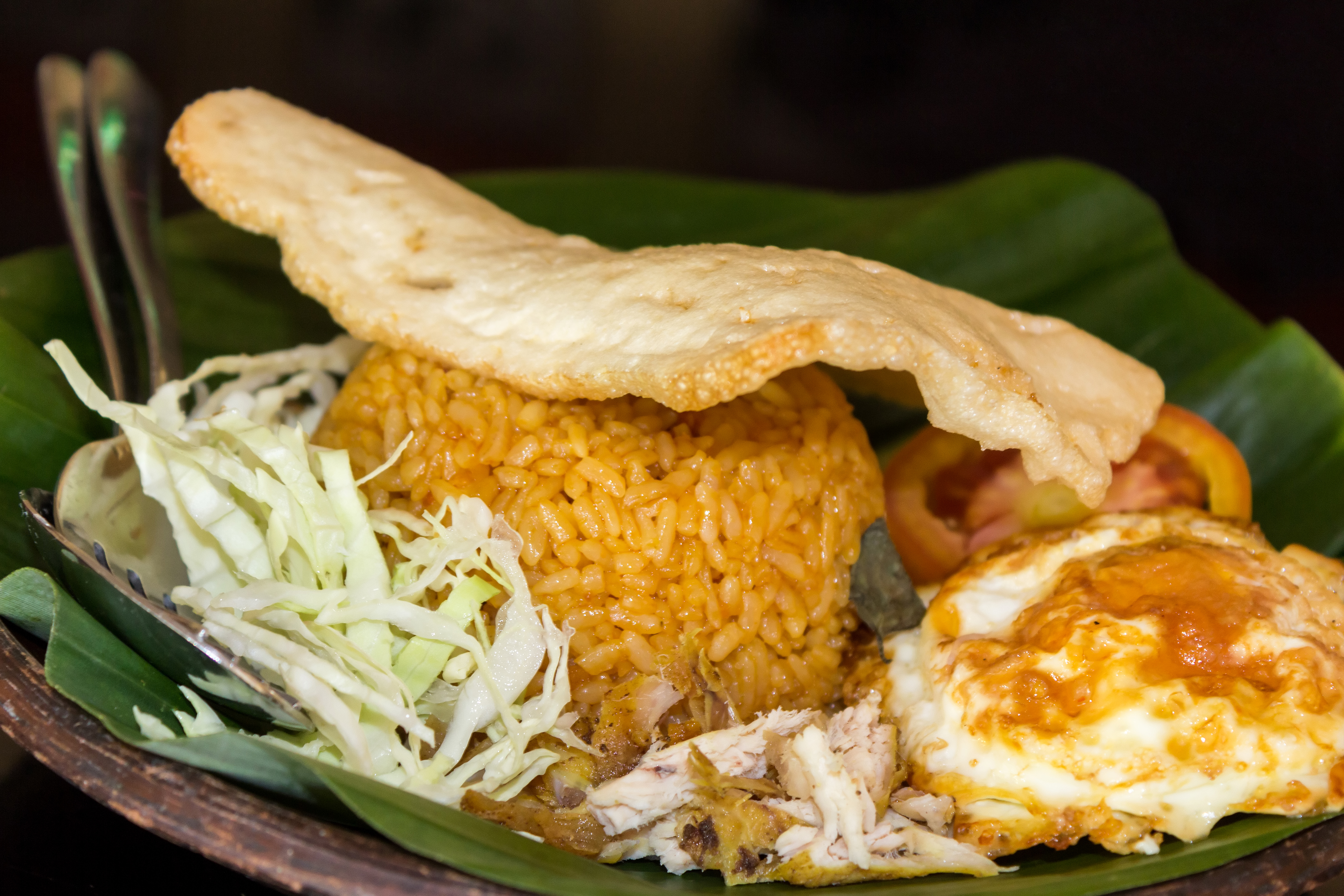
Indonesian nasi goreng with chicken, fried egg, prawn cracker and vegetables

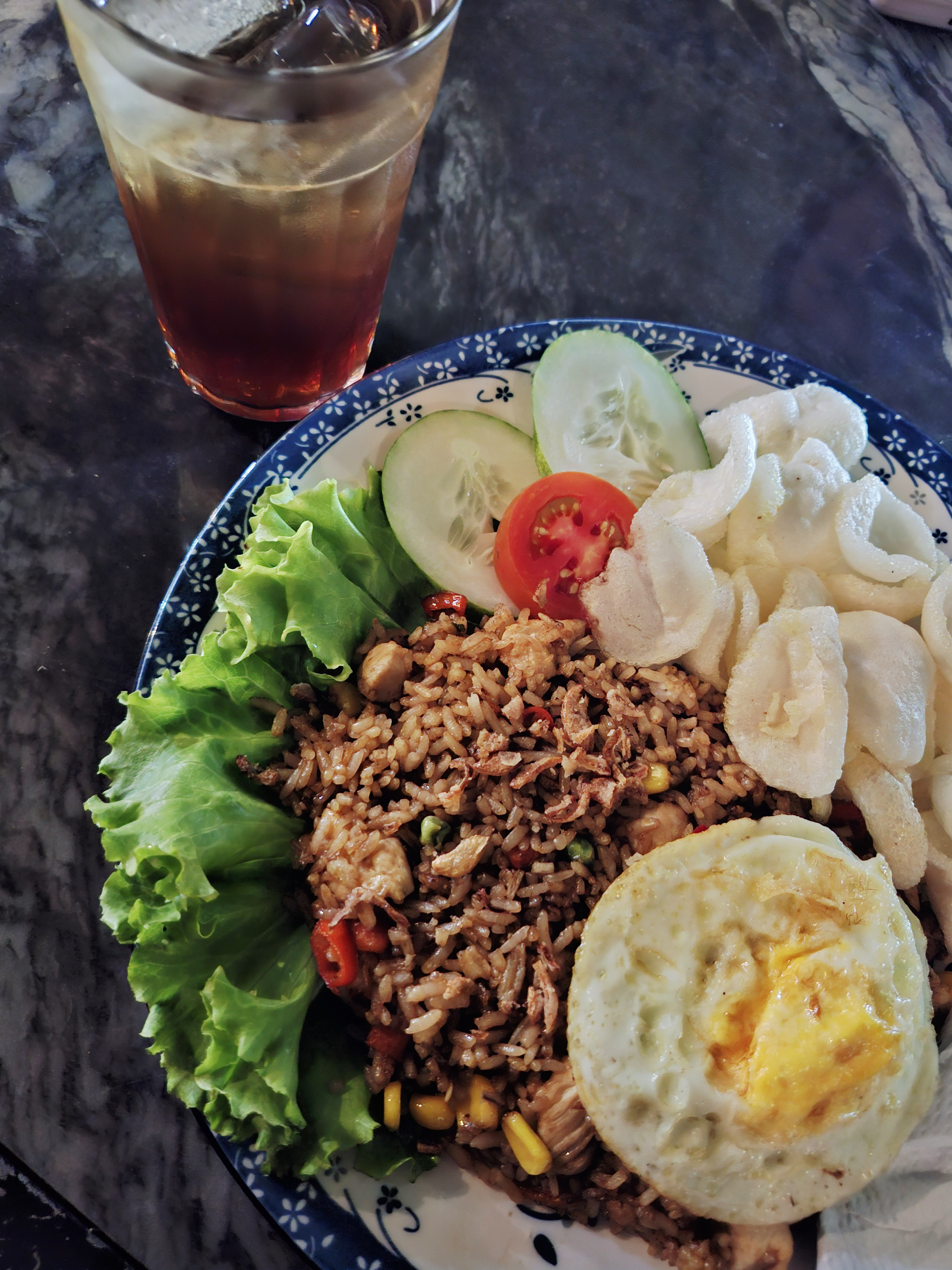
Spicy Indonesian fried rice

- Nasi goreng means fried rice in Indonesian and Malay languages. It is one of five national dishes of Indonesia. It is distinguished from other Asian fried rice recipes through the widespread use of sweet soy sauce (kecap manis) and ground shrimp paste. It is often accompanied by additional items such as a fried egg, fried chicken, satay, and condiments such as sambal, acar, and krupuk. It is endemic to Indonesia, Brunei, Malaysia, Singapore, and is also popular in the Netherlands.
- Nasi goreng jawa, which means "Javanese fried rice", commonly includes sambal ulek as a seasoning and has a spicy flavor.
- Nasi goreng pattaya is Malaysian-style nasi goreng wrapped inside an egg omelette. The fried rice is generally mixed with a variety of vegetables and meat and garnished with tomato sauce. In Indonesia, the dish is called nasi goreng amplop.
- Nasi goreng ikan asin/masin is fried rice with salted fish.
- Sambal fried rice, found in Singapore, is a variation of fried rice made with sambal, a condiment based on chilis and belachan, derived from Indonesian and Malaysian influences.
- Nasi goreng kambing, an Indonesian variety of fried rice including goat or lamb, is made with spices such as bay leaves, cloves, cardamom, and cumin. It is accompanied with acar, and krupuk. It is derived from Arab influences.

==== Cambodia ====
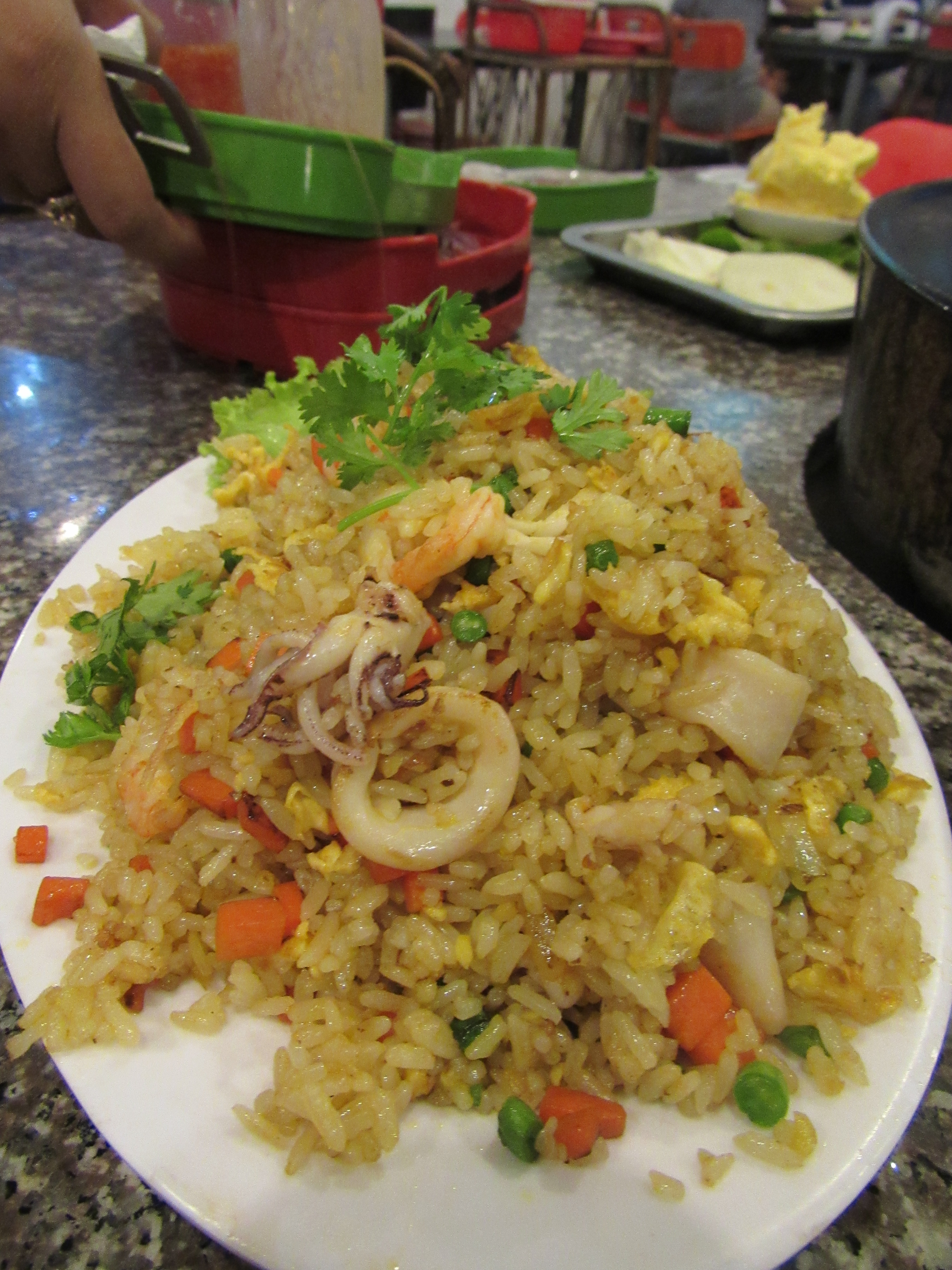
Cambodian seafood fried rice

- Bai cha (បាយឆា) is the Cambodian variation of fried rice and usually includes pork, sausages, eggs, garlic, soy sauce, and herbs. There are numerous variations of the dish in Cambodia, including bai cha kapi (បាយឆាកាពិ) made with shrimp and shrimp paste (kapi).

==== Myanmar ====
- Burmese fried rice (ထမင်း‌ကြော်, htamin gyaw) normally uses Burmese fragrant short grain rice (rounder and shorter than other varieties). A popular plain version consists of rice, boiled peas, onions, garlic, and dark soy sauce. An accompanying condiment could be ngapi kyaw (fried fish paste with shredded flakes) and fresh cucumber strips mixed with chopped onions, green chili, and vinegar.

==== Philippines ====
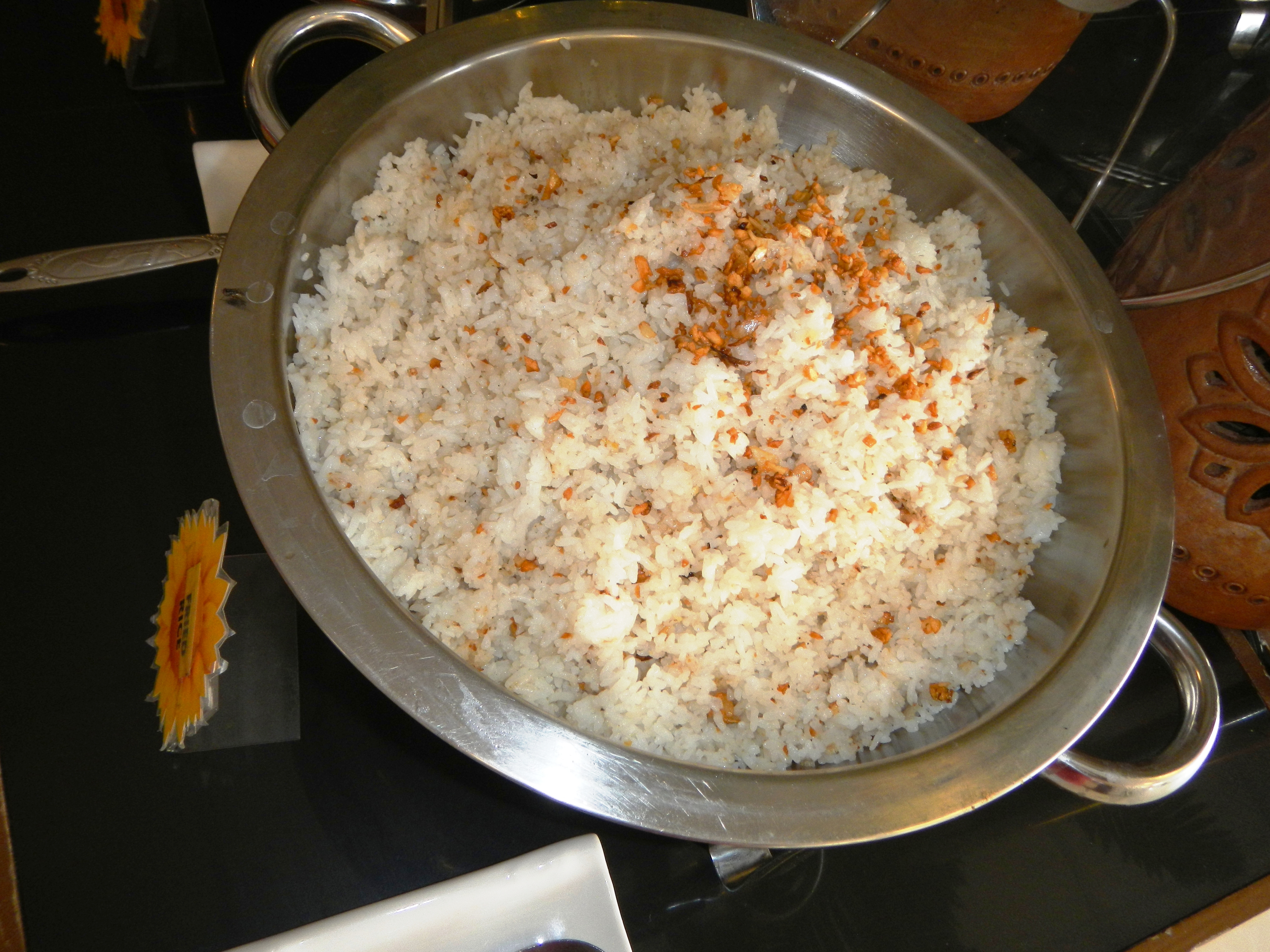
Filipino sinangag, also commonly known as "garlic fried rice"

- Aligue rice, also known as "crab fat fried rice" or "aligue fried rice", is similar to sinangág, but with the notable addition of aligue (crab fat paste), which turns the dish a vivid orange-yellow. It can be combined with seafood like shrimp and squid and eaten as is, or eaten paired with meat dishes.
- Bagoong fried rice is a type of Filipino fried rice using bagoong alamang (shrimp paste) as its main flavoring agent. Meat, scallions, as well as green mangoes are optionally additions.
- Java rice, also called "yellow fried rice", is a Filipino fried rice dish characterized by its yellow-orange color due to the use of turmeric or annatto. It is commonly seasoned with pimiento, bell peppers, paprika or tomato ketchup. It is usually eaten with chicken barbecue (inihaw) dishes.
- Morisqueta tostada, sometimes called "Spanish-style fried rice", is a very old colonial-era Chinese Filipino fried rice recipe with Spanish influences. The name of the dish translates to "toasted boiled rice" in Chavacano. It is characterized by the addition of sausage (chorizo de bilbao, chorizo de macao, or Chinese sausage), ham, shrimp, and spring onions.
- Sinangág, also called "garlic fried rice", is a Filipino fried rice cooked by stir-frying pre-cooked rice with garlic. The rice used is preferably stale, usually leftover cooked rice from the previous day, as it results in rice that is slightly fermented and firmer. It is garnished with toasted garlic, salt, and black pepper. The rice grains are ideally loose and do not stick together.

Sinangág is rarely eaten on its own, but is usually paired with a "dry" meat dish like tocino, longganisa, tapa, or spam. Unlike other types of fried rice, it does not normally use ingredients other than garlic, so it does not overwhelm the flavour of the main dish. When they do use other ingredients, the most common additions are scrambled eggs, chopped scallions, and cubed carrots. Cashews might also be added. Sinangág is a common part of a traditional Filipino breakfast, and it usually prepared with leftover rice from the dinner before. It is one of the components of the tapsilog breakfast and its derivatives.

- Classic adobo rice is a one-dish meal of classic fried rice with crispy Philippine adobo flakes and salted duck egg with onion leeks.
- The giant fried rice of SM City Baguio dubbed as “Rice and Shine 3.0” has 15 flavors using 1,600 kilogram of rice which served 16,000 visitors.

==== Thailand ====
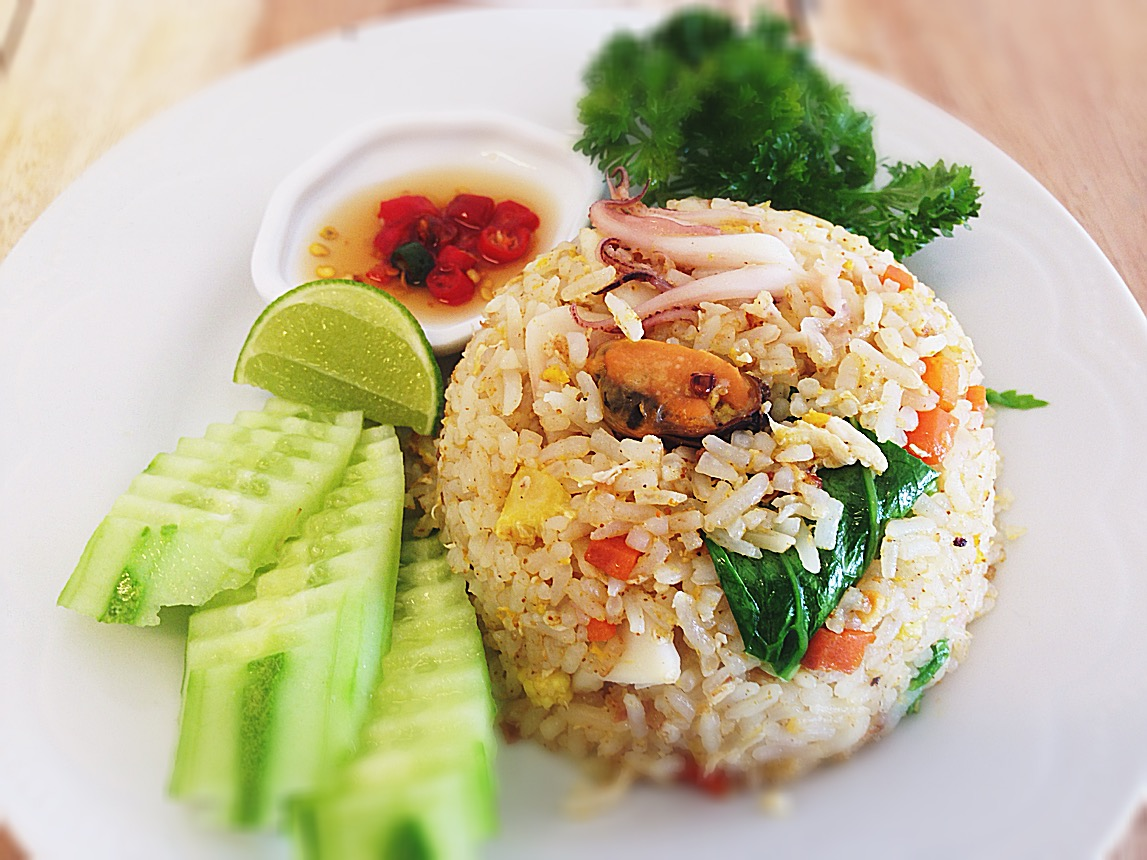
Khao phat thale, seafood fried rice

Fried rice (Thai: ข้าวผัด, RTGS: khao phat, pronounced [kʰâ(ː)w pʰàt]) in Thailand is typical of central Thai cuisine. In Thai, khao means "rice" and phat means "of or relating to being stir-fried". This dish differs from Chinese fried rice in that it is prepared with Thai jasmine rice instead of regular long-grain rice. It normally contains meat (chicken, shrimp, pork, and crab are all common), egg, onions, garlic and sometimes tomatoes. The seasonings, which may include soy sauce, sugar, salt, possibly some chili sauce, and the ubiquitous nam pla (fish sauce), are stir-fried together with the other ingredients. The dish is then plated and served with accompaniments like cucumber slices, tomato slices, lime, sprigs of green onion and coriander, and prik nam pla, a spicy sauce made of Thai chili, fish sauce, and chopped garlic.

==== Vietnam ====
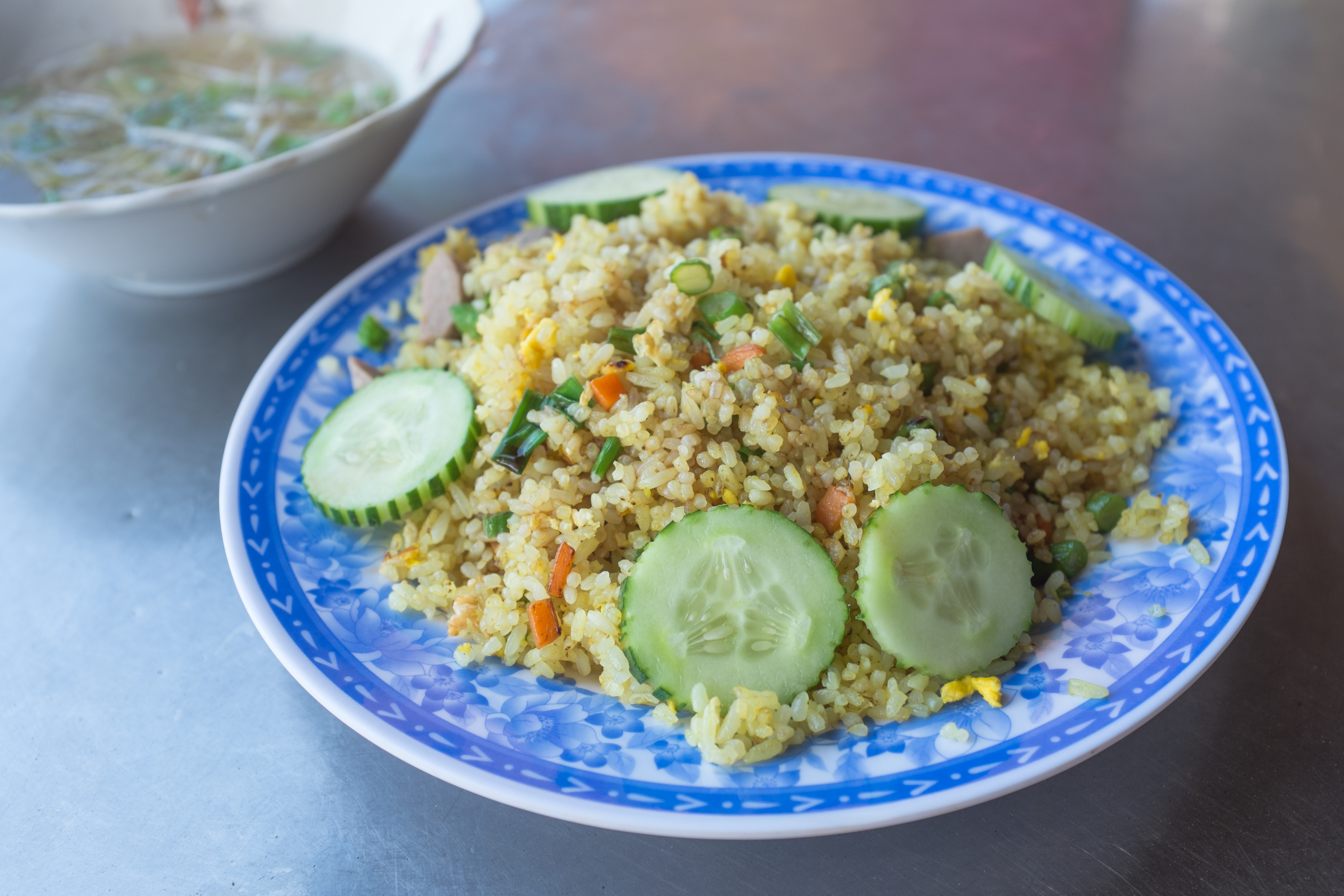
Cơm chiên, Da Nang, Vietnam

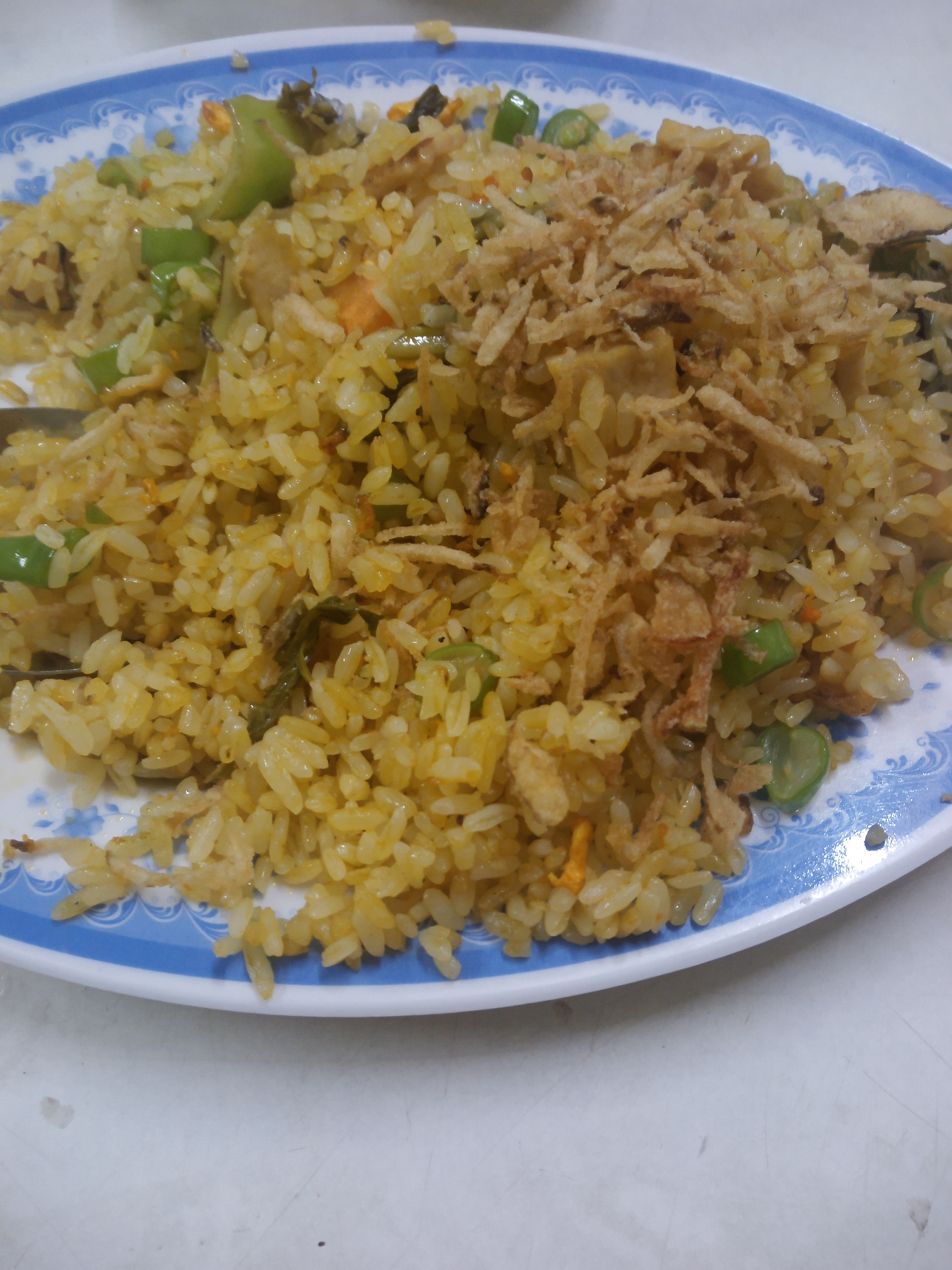
A plate of homemade cơm rang

- Cơm chiên or cơm rang is a Vietnamese variation of the Chinese fried rice that includes diced sausage, stirred eggs, soy sauce or nước mắm, and onions.

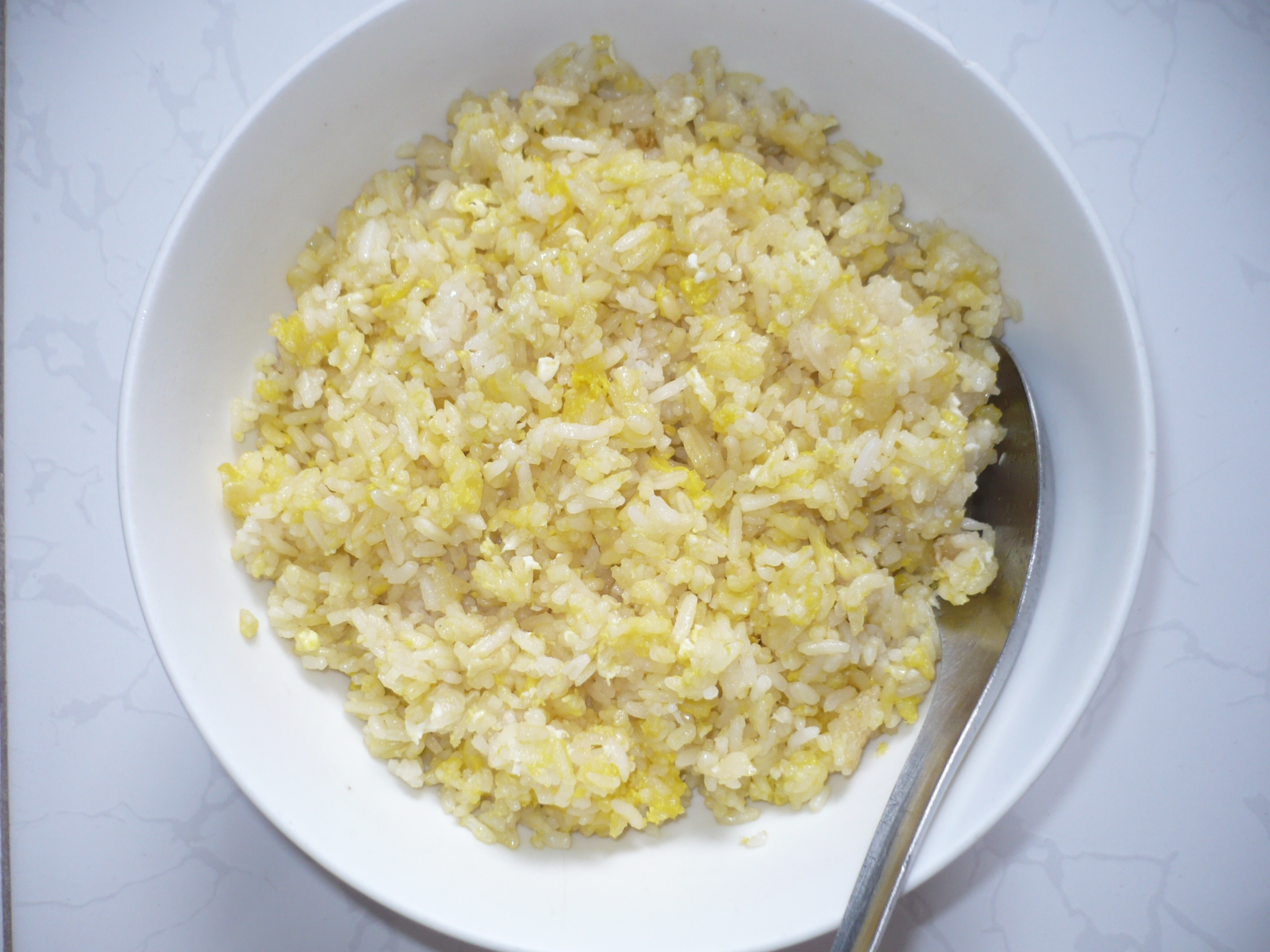
Cơm rang with eggs

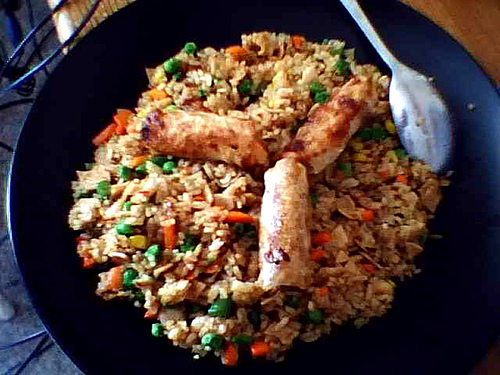
Mixed cơm chiên

=== South Asia ===
==== India ====
- Fried rice is one of the most popular dishes of Indian Chinese cuisine in India.
- Curry fried rice is standard fried rice mixed with curry powder for a spicier flavor.
- Tava pulav or tawa pulao is a fried rice dish from Mumbai.
- Chicken fried rice is fried rice with chicken pieces made in huge pan.
- Paneer fried rice is also popular with fried paneer mixed with spicy fried rice.

==== Nepal ====
- Bhuteko bhat (भुटेको भात) is a Nepalese version of fried rice generally eaten with achar; However, curry and dhal may also be served alongside it.

==== Sri Lanka ====
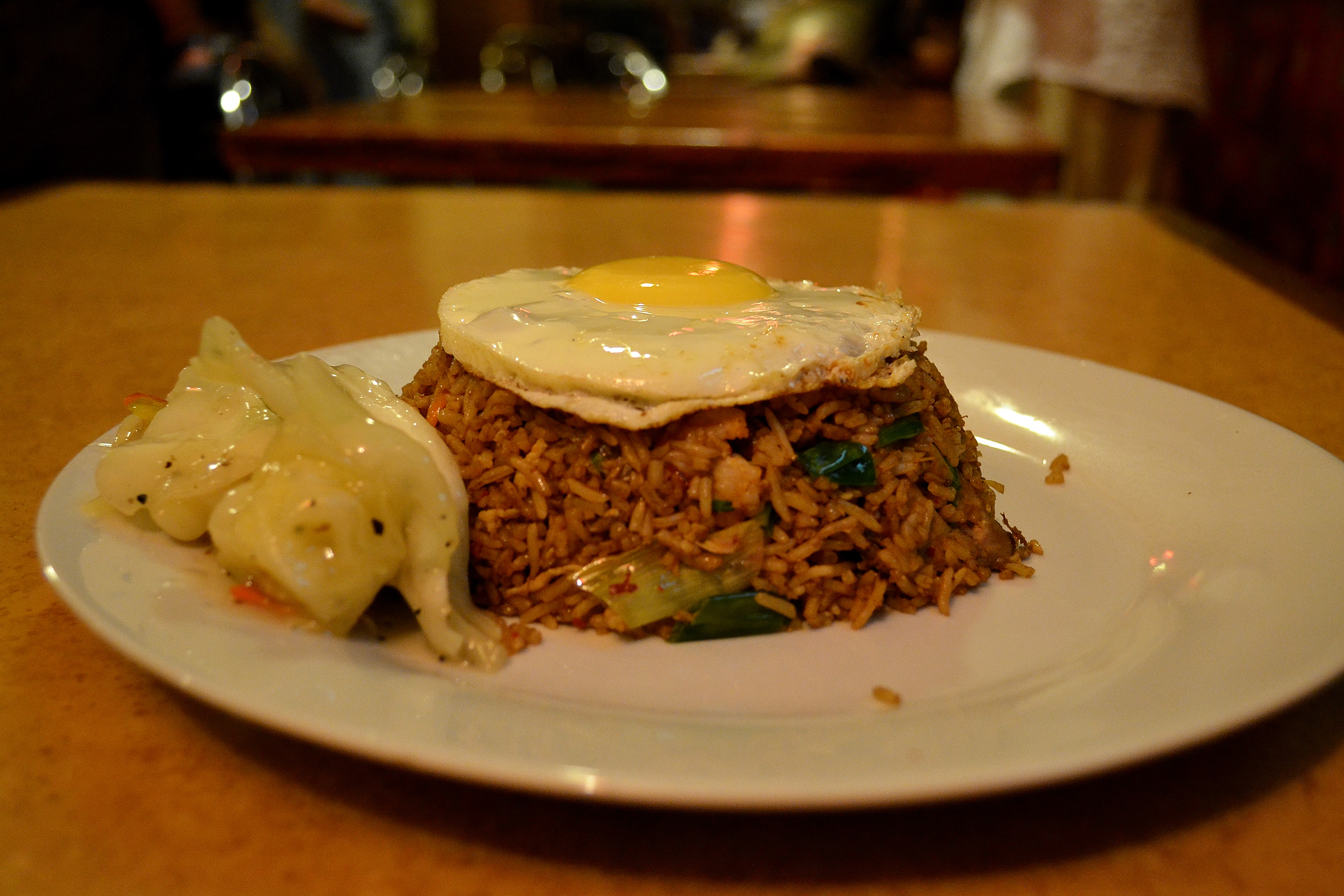
Sri Lankan nasi goreng served with a fried egg

- Sri Lankan fried rice (Sinhala: ෆ්රයිඩ් රයිස්), (Tamil: வறுத்த அரிசி) is a Sri Lankan variation of the original Chinese version. However, basmati or other native varieties of rice are used and Sri Lankan spices are also added to it.
- Nasi goreng (Sinhala: නාසි ගොරේන්) is a popular fried rice dish widely eaten throughout the country. It entered Sri Lankan cuisine through cultural influences from the Malay and Indonesian cuisines.

=== Pacific ===
==== Hawaii ====
- Hawaiian fried rice is a common style of fried rice in Hawaii usually containing egg, green onions, peas, cubed carrots, and either Portuguese sausage or Spam, or both, and is sometimes available with kimchi added. It is normally cooked in sesame oil.

=== Americas ===
Arroz frito is a denomination used in the Spanish speaking world, meaning "fried rice", with adjectives describing the Chinese-inspired varieties, e.g. arroz chino, arroz cantonés, or local specialties arroz chaufa/chaulafán/chaufán/chofán, arroz frito tres delicias.

- Bacon and egg fried rice

==== Ecuador ====
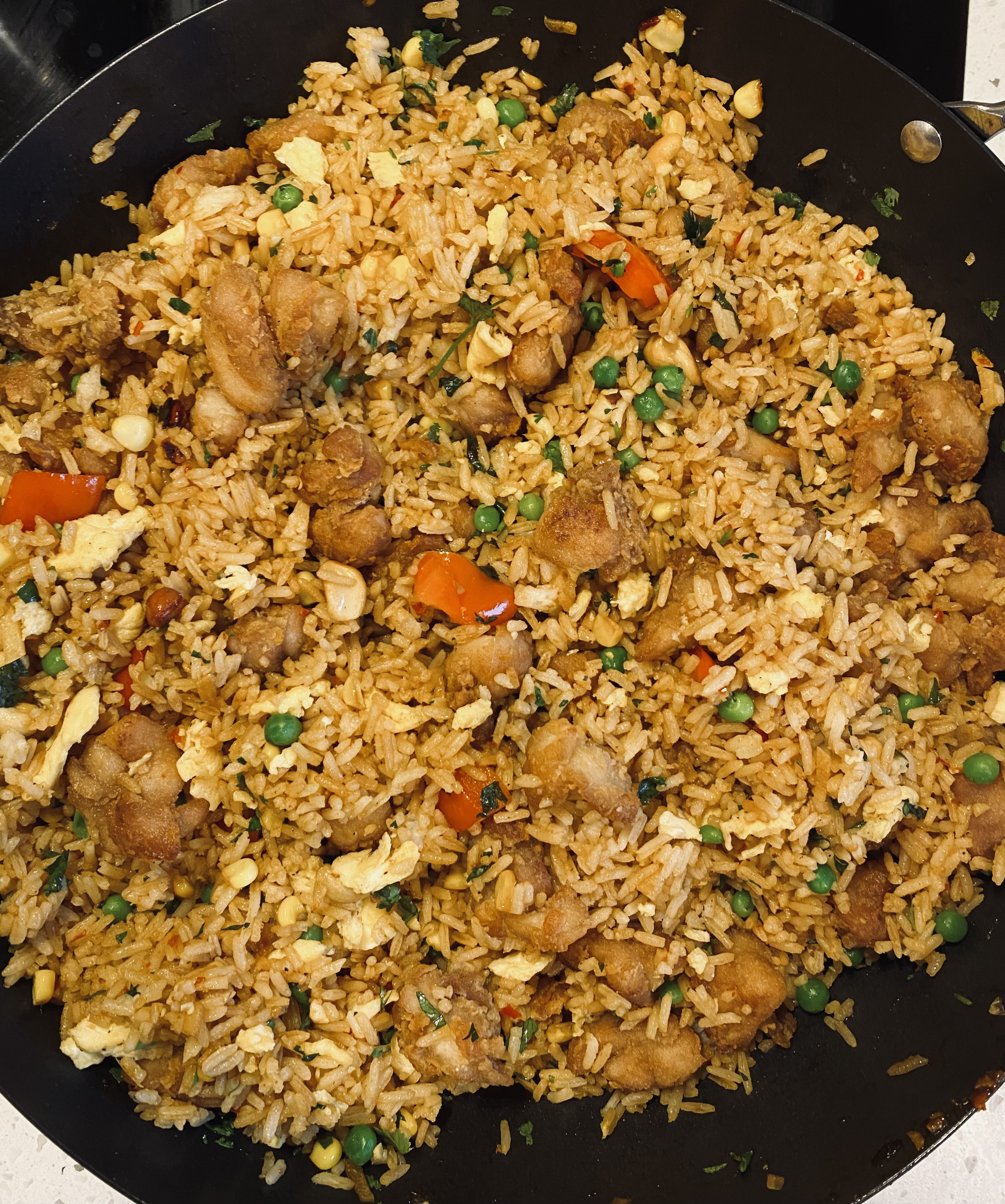
Chaulafan de Pollo (Ecuadorian chicken fried rice)

- Chaulafán (from Yue Chinese: 炒冷飯; Jyutping: caau² laang⁵ faan⁶) is the name for Chinese fried rice in Ecuador. In Ecuador and Peru, dark soy sauce is preferred in fried rice. Meats typically used are pork, beef, chicken or fish/seafood (e.g. shrimp).

==== Cuba ====
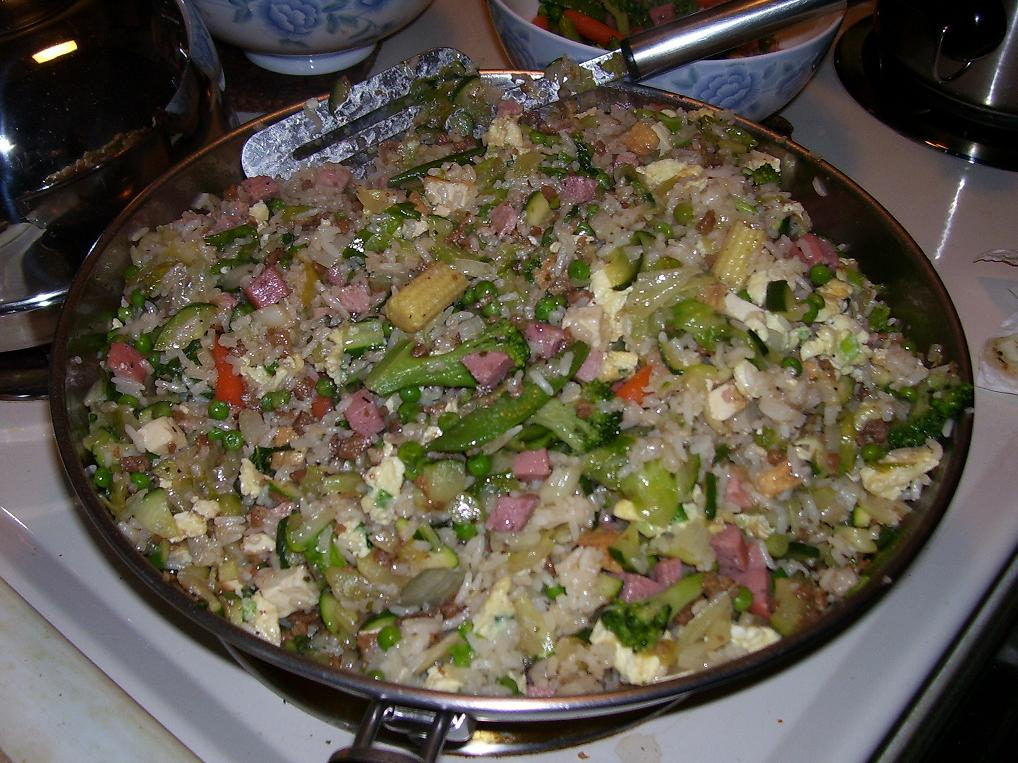
Arroz frito, Cuban-Chinese fried rice

- Arroz frito (Cuban fried rice) is very similar to "special fried rice". It can be found alongside typical criollo dishes in many Cuban restaurants. This dish features ham, grilled pork, shrimp, chicken, and eggs, along with a variety of vegetables. Some restaurants add lechón (Cuban-style suckling pig), lobster tails, or crab. Chinese Cubans are responsible for the dish's introduction.

==== Dominican Republic ====
An estimated 30,000 people of Chinese origin live in the Dominican Republic. Migration from China began in the second half of the 19th century. Dominican fried rice is known as chofán. The dish is made with leftover rice, celery, garlic, bell peppers, red onion, carrots, peas, and soy sauce sautéed in vegetable oil. Protein such as ham, chicken, eggs or shrimp can be added. What makes Dominican chofán distinct from other fried rice dish is the use of lippia (Jamaican oregano) and bouillon cube.

==== Peru ====
- Arroz chaufa is a popular name for Chinese fried rice in Peru, belonging to the chifa kitchen. In Chile, it is called arroz chaufán. The most common varieties are made using the same ingredients used in China. Some exotic versions may use dried meat, beef tongue, alligator, or lizard in place of more traditional meats. In some regions, the rice is replaced with quinoa or pearled wheat, while in others the rice is mixed with noodles. Aeropuerto is a big Peruvian arroz chaufa dish containing fried noodles and many other additions.

==== Puerto Rico ====
- Arroz mamposteao is a kind of fried rice in Puerto Rico. It was brought to the island by Chinese immigrants and is usually made with leftover rice and typically Asian ingredients such as bean sprouts, ginger, garlic, soy sauce, combined with popular Puerto Rican ingredients such as red beans, sweet plantains, squash, bacon, longaniza, and variety of vegetables. Puerto Rican fried rice is usually garnished with sesame seeds, avocado, cilantro, cheese or aioli. Left over stew beans can also be added. The beans are typically stewed in sofrito, tomato sauce, spices, pork, potatoes and other ingredients.

=== Africa ===
==== Ghana ====
Fried rice can be found in almost every Ghanaian restaurant. It is usually made with Jasmine rice, long grain, or basmati rice. The rice is stir-fried with vegetables(carrots, spring onions, peas, green and red bell peppers), eggs, meat or fish (chicken, beef, shrimp), and spices like chili, curry powder, and salt. It is usually seasoned with soy sauce or Shito pepper sauce.

==== Nigeria ====
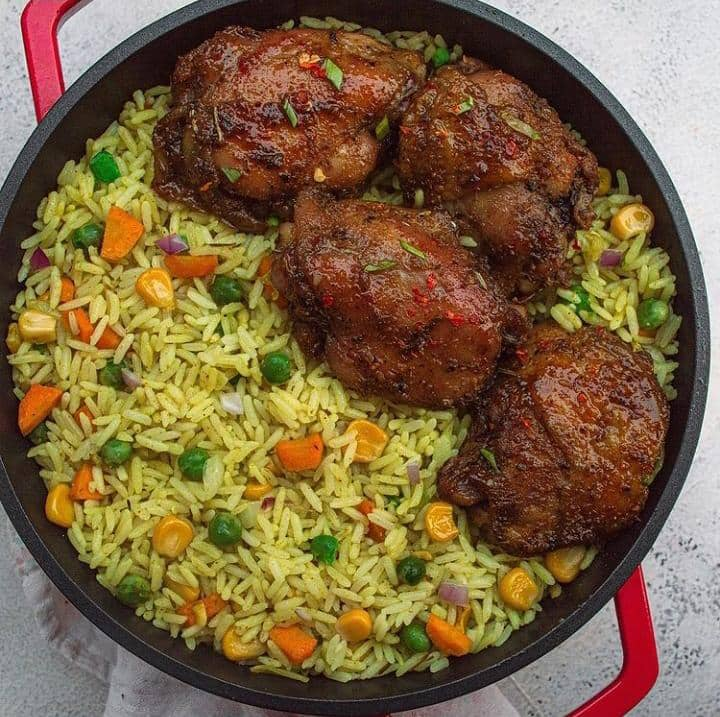
Nigerian fried rice

Nigerian fried rice is made with parboiled rice (whether of the standard long-grain or Golden-Sella-basmati varieties), diced fried cow liver (optional) or shrimp, protein (chicken, pork, or shrimp), vegetables (such as carrots, peas, green beans, onions, and chillies), herbs and spices (such as thyme, pepper, and curry powder), and so on.

==== Tanzania ====
Tanzania fried rice is made with long-grain rice, protein (such as beef liver, chicken, or shrimp), vegetables (such as carrots, peas, green beans, onions, and chillies), herbs and spices (such as thyme, pepper, and curry powder), and so on.

== Gallery ==
Fried rice dishes

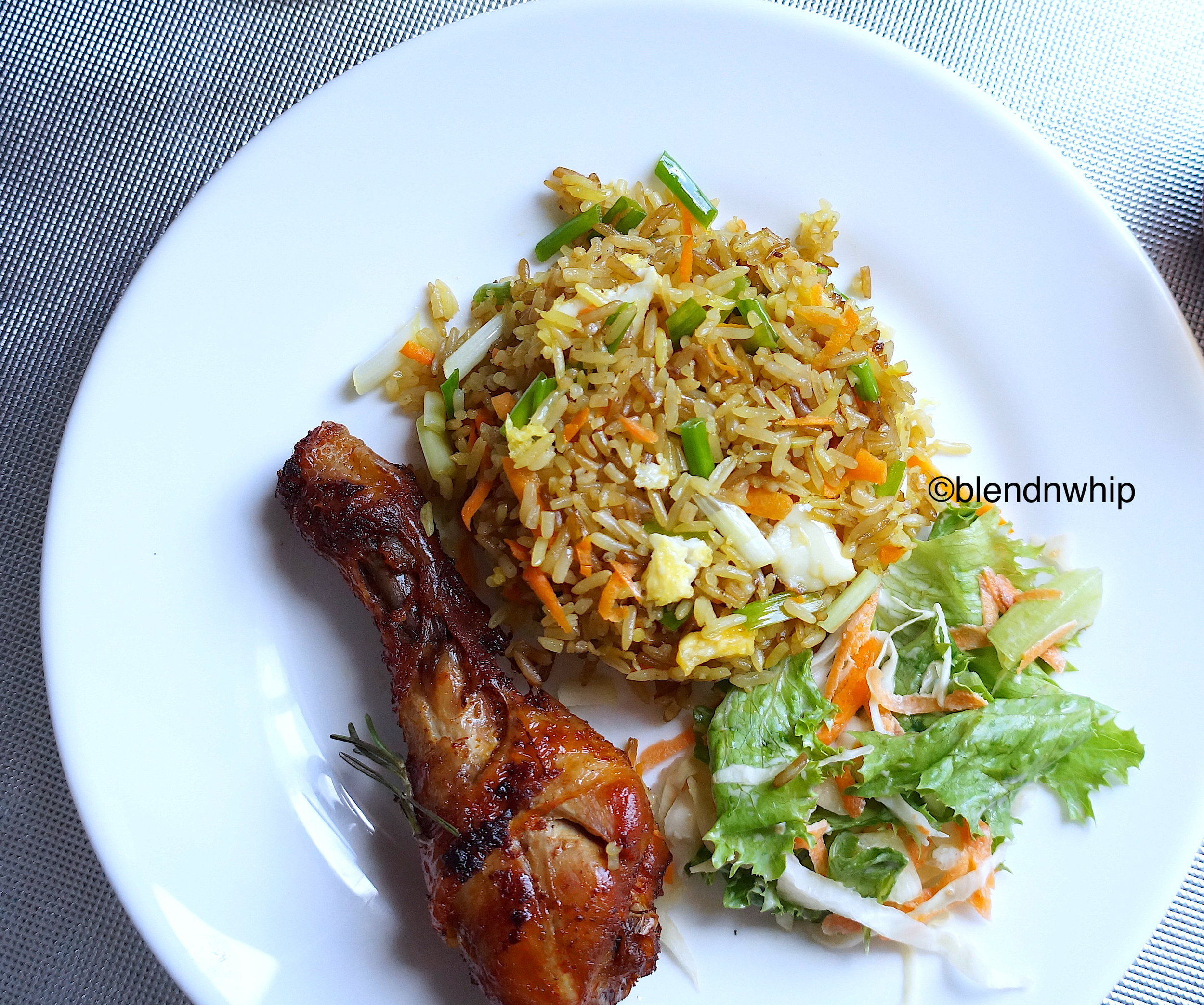
Ghanaian fried rice

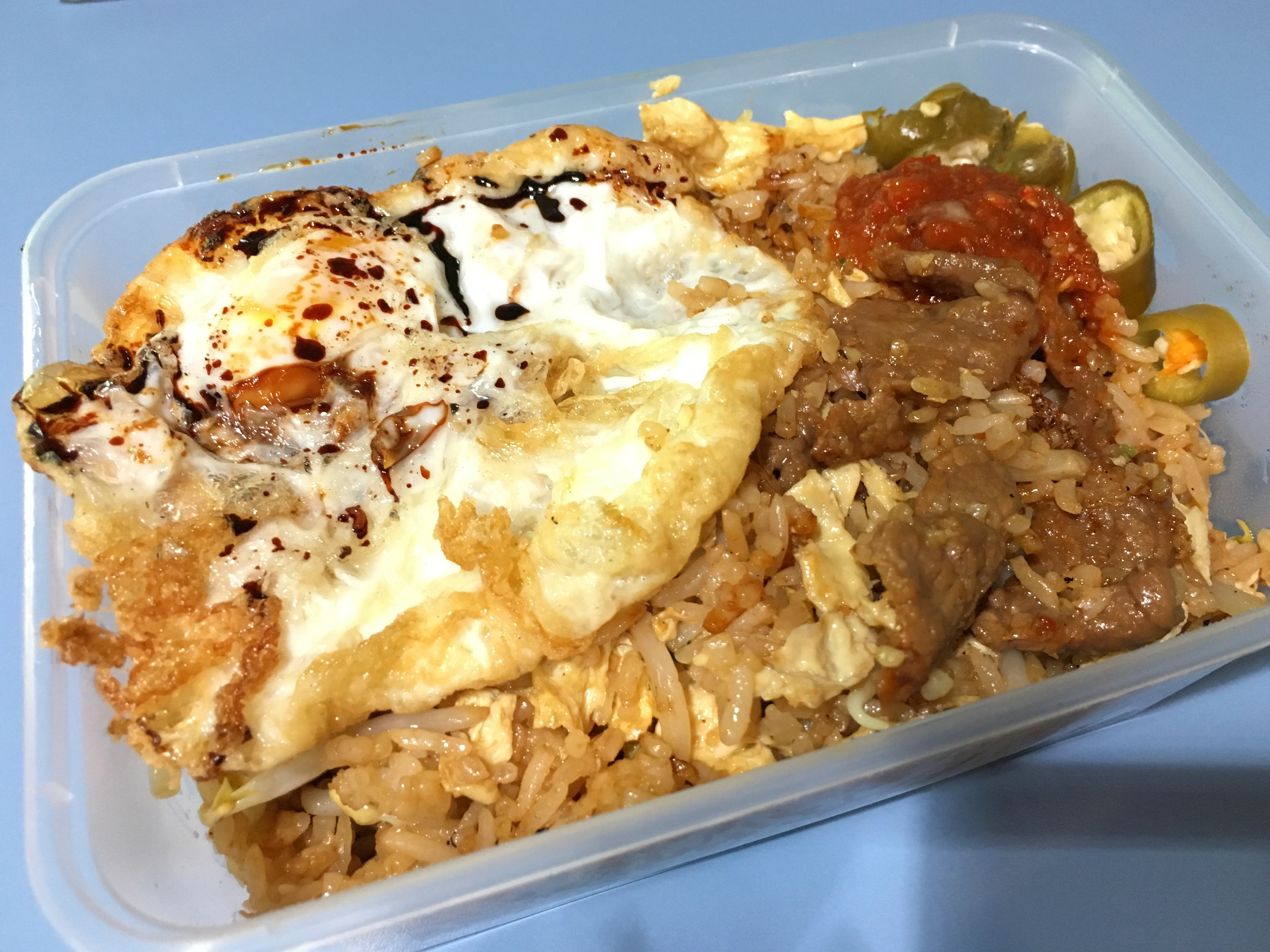
Beef fried rice topped with a sunny side up egg

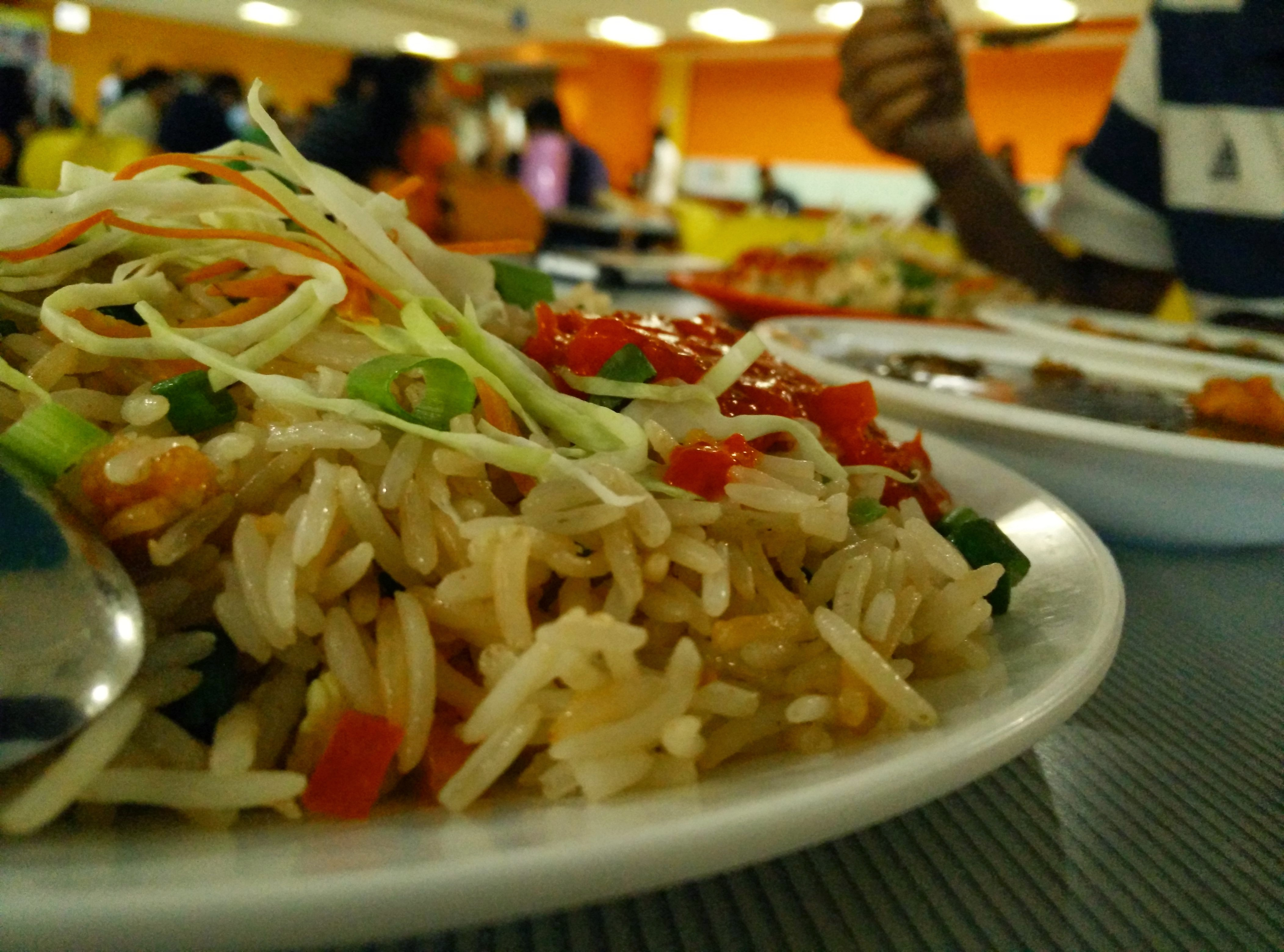
Szechwan fried rice is an Indo-Chinese dish

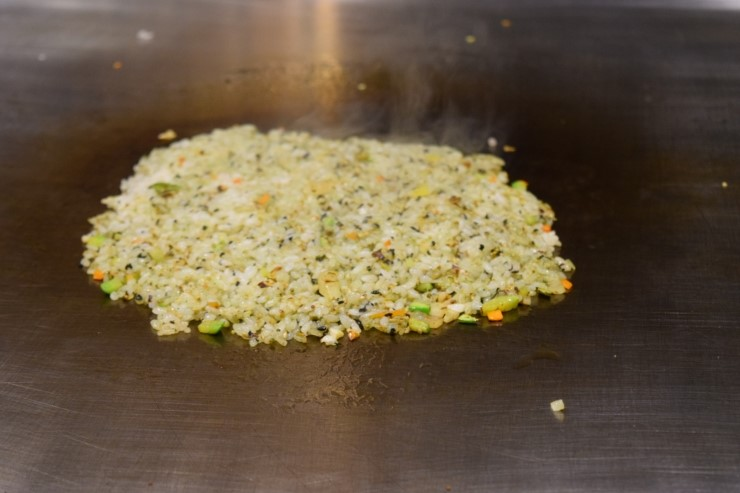
Cheolpan-bokkeum-bap on iron griddle

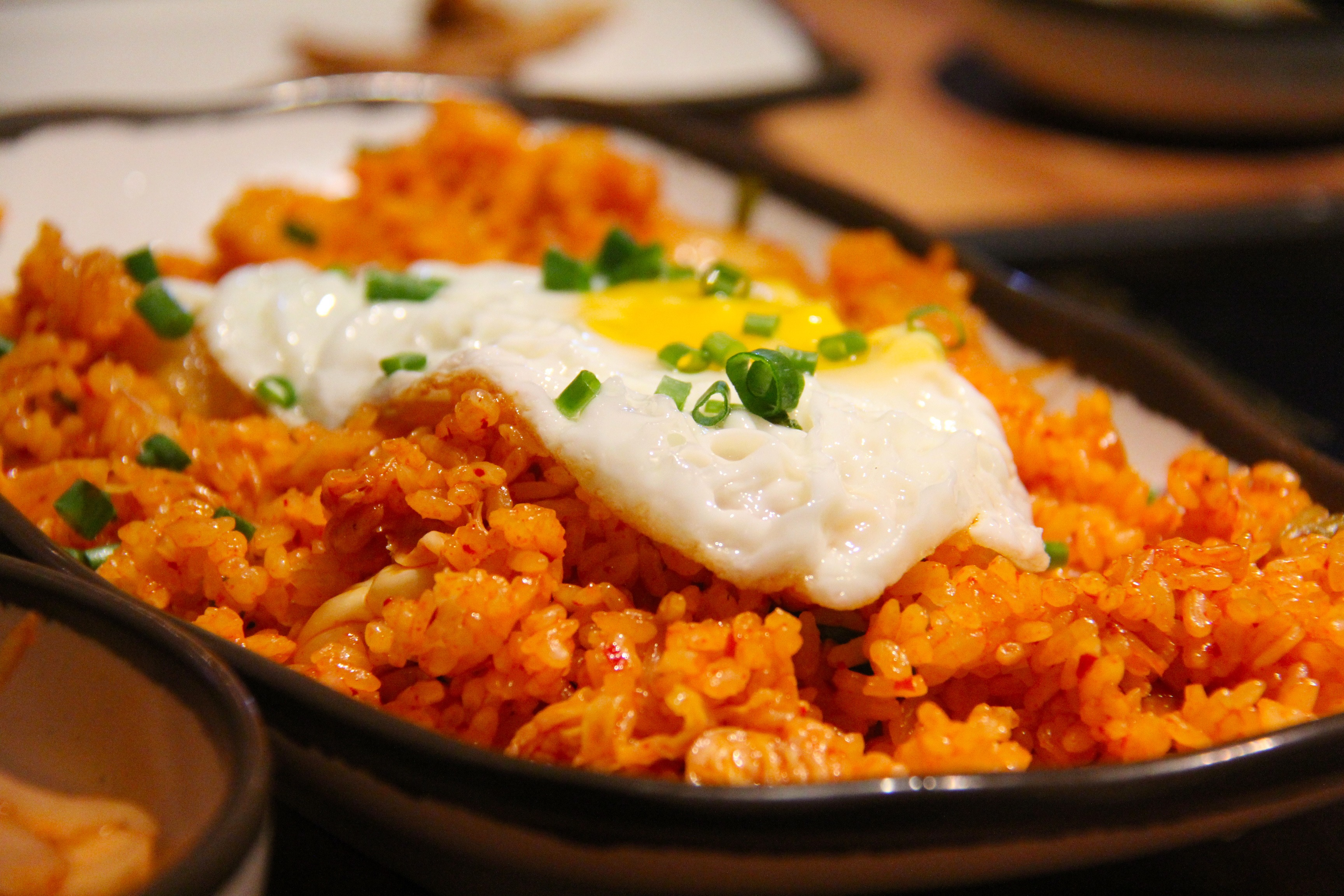
Kimchi-bokkeum-bap, the most popular Korean fried rice

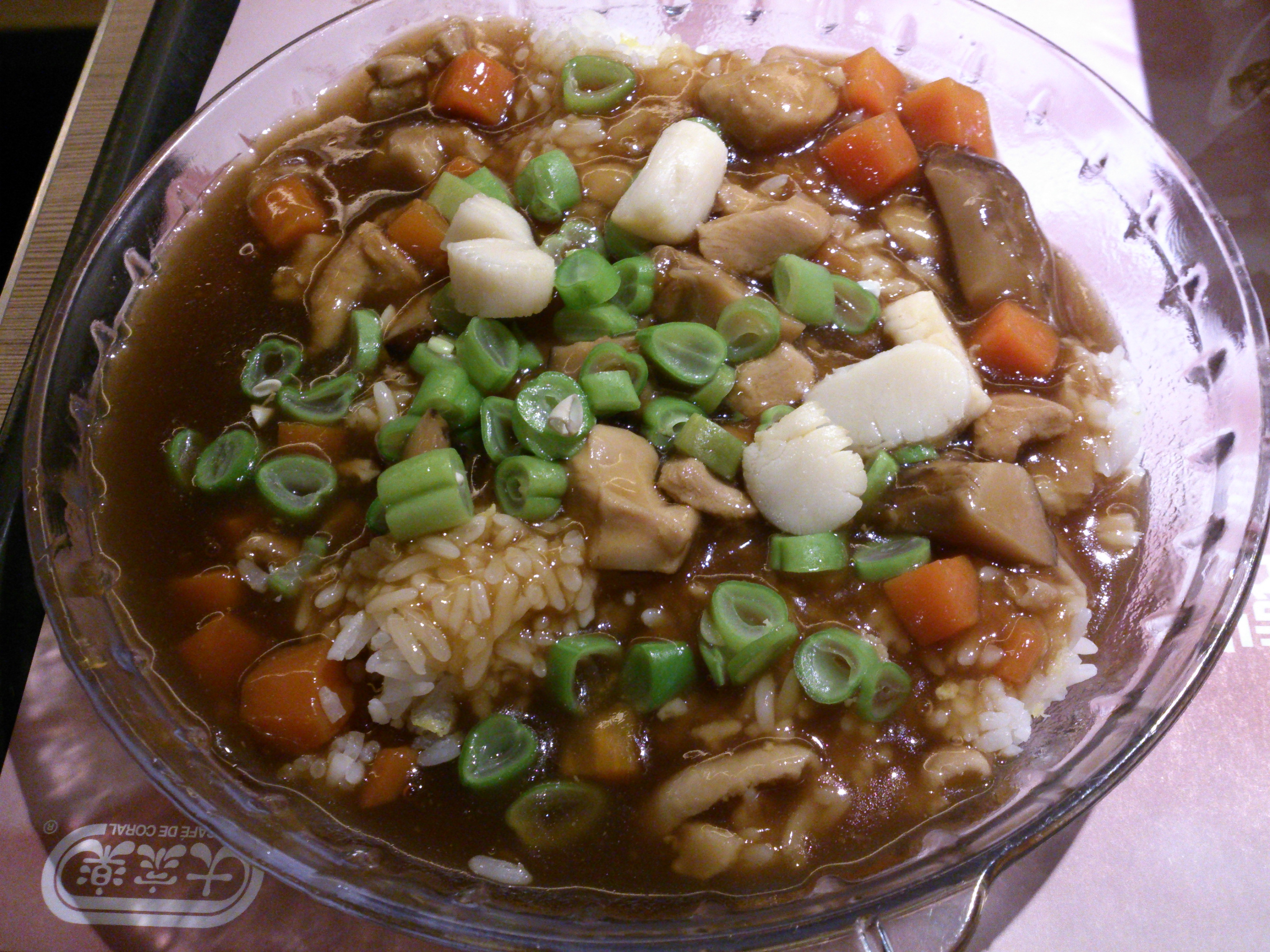
Fuk gin caau faan, Hokkien fried rice

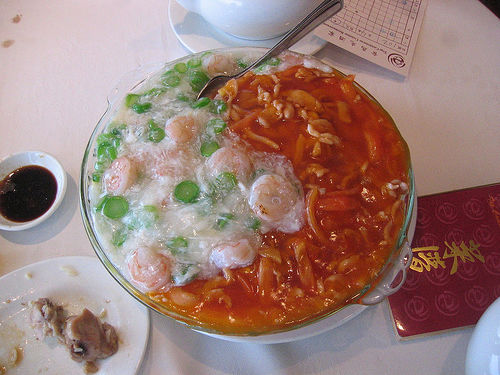
Jyun joeng caau faan, Hong Kong-style "mandarin ducks" fried rice

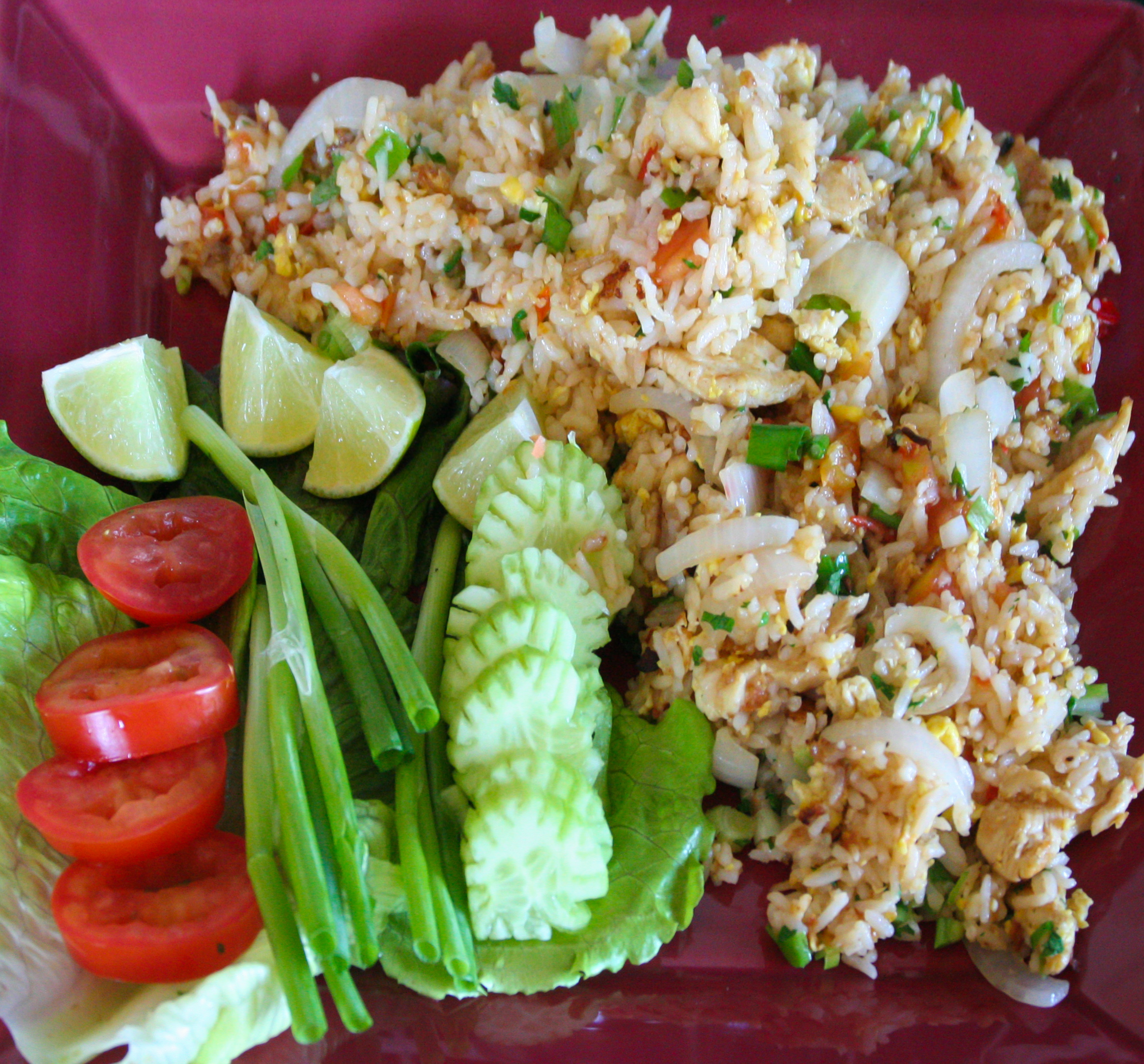
Khao phat, Thai fried rice

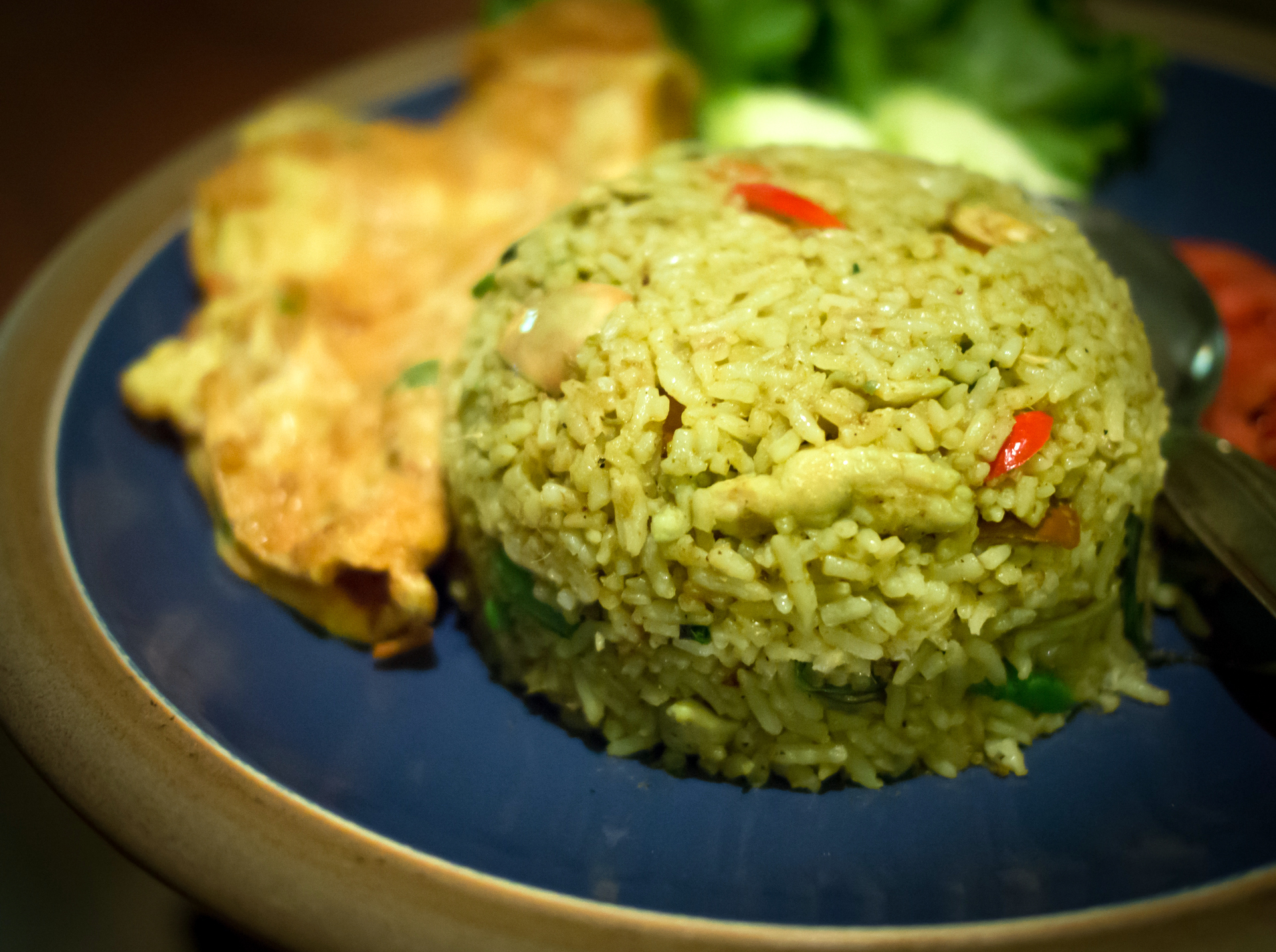
Khao phat kaeng khiao wan, green curry fried rice

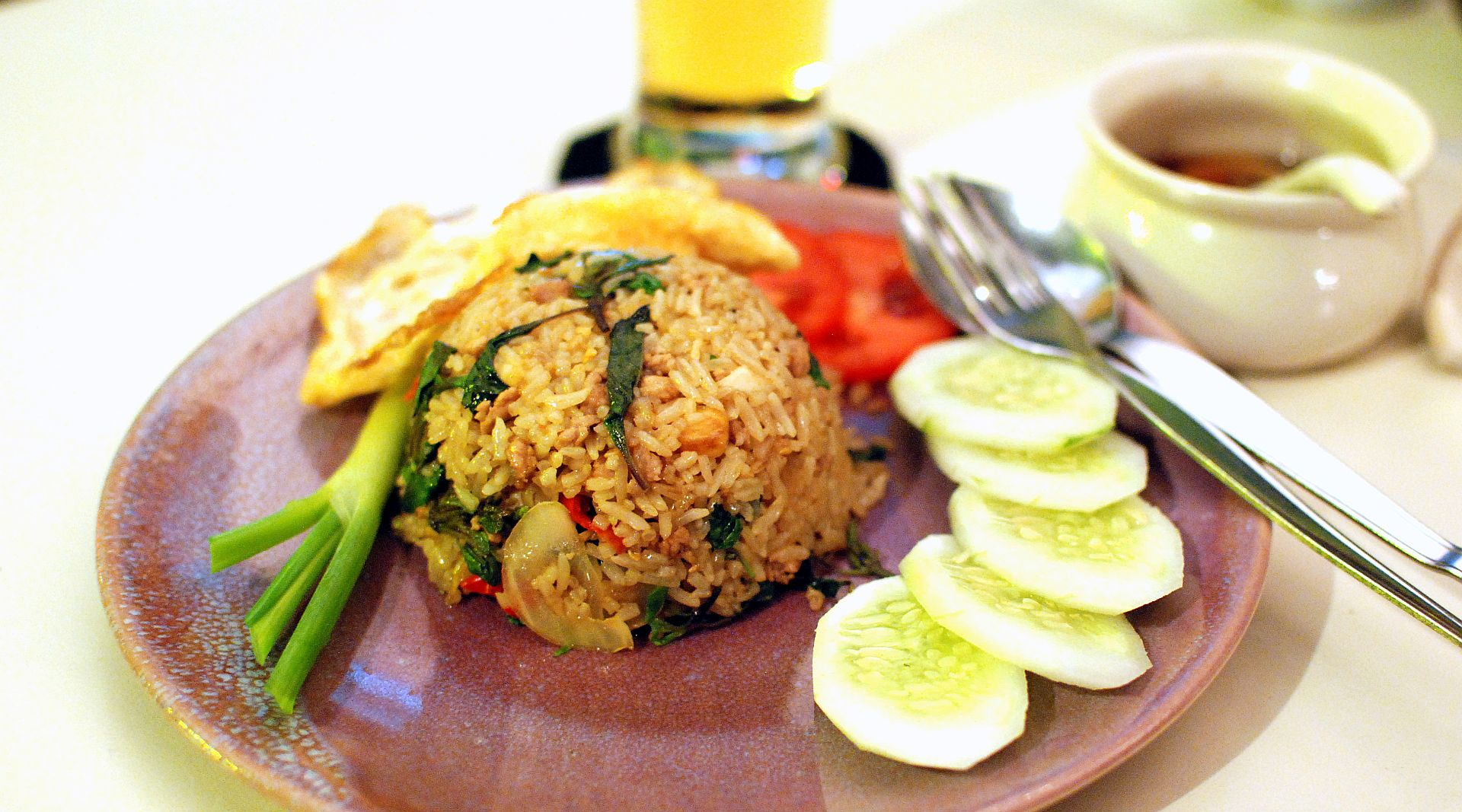
Khao phat kaphrao, Thai fried rice with holy basil

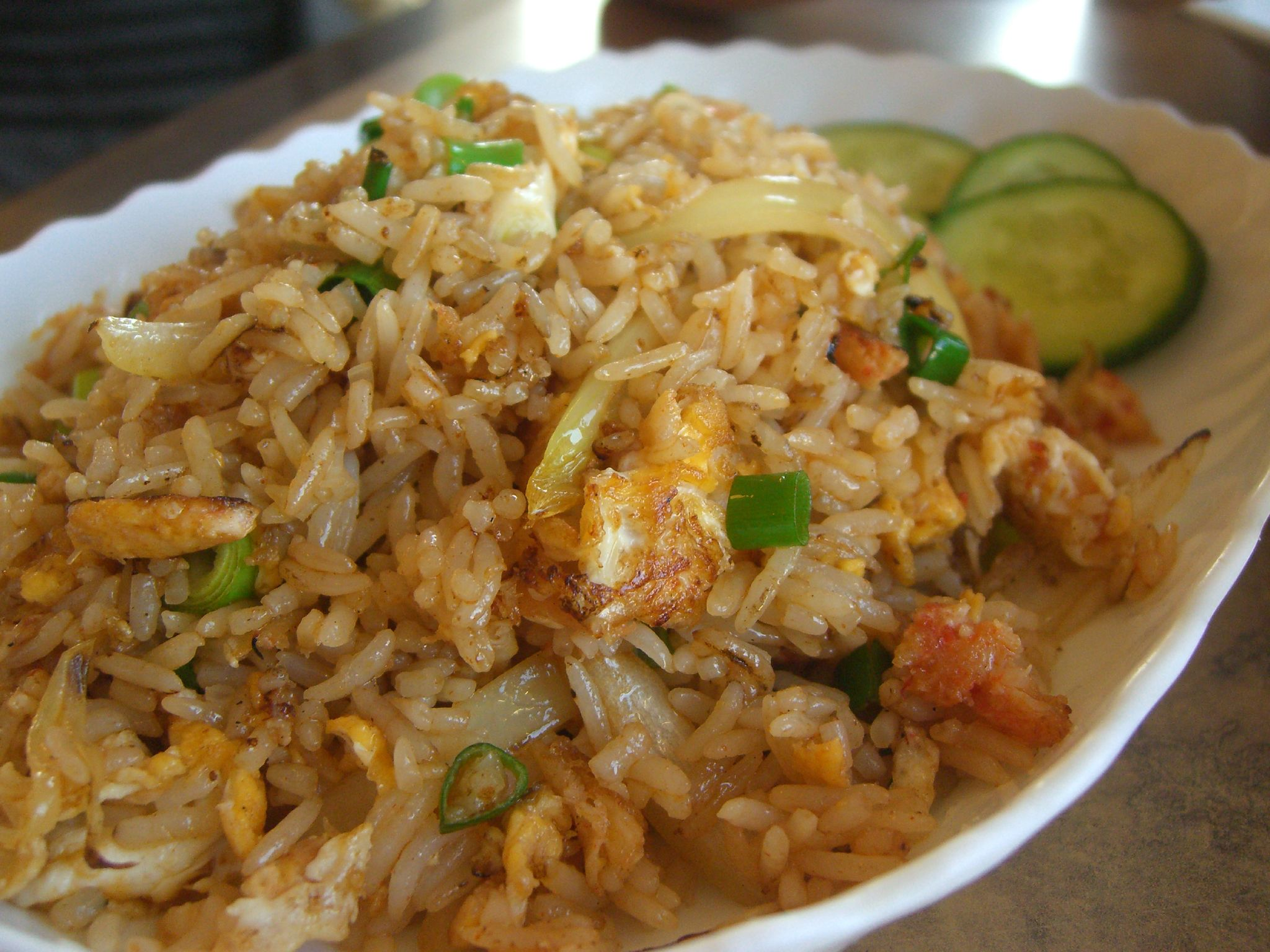
Khao phat pu, Thai fried rice with crab meat

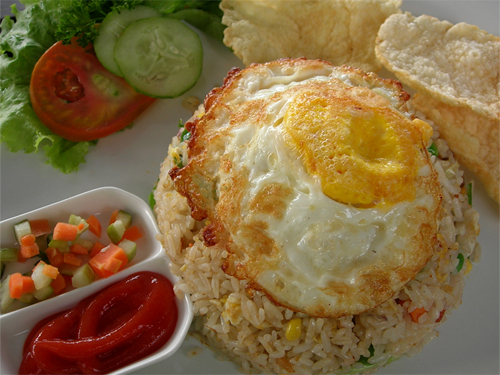
Nasi goreng with salted fish and egg

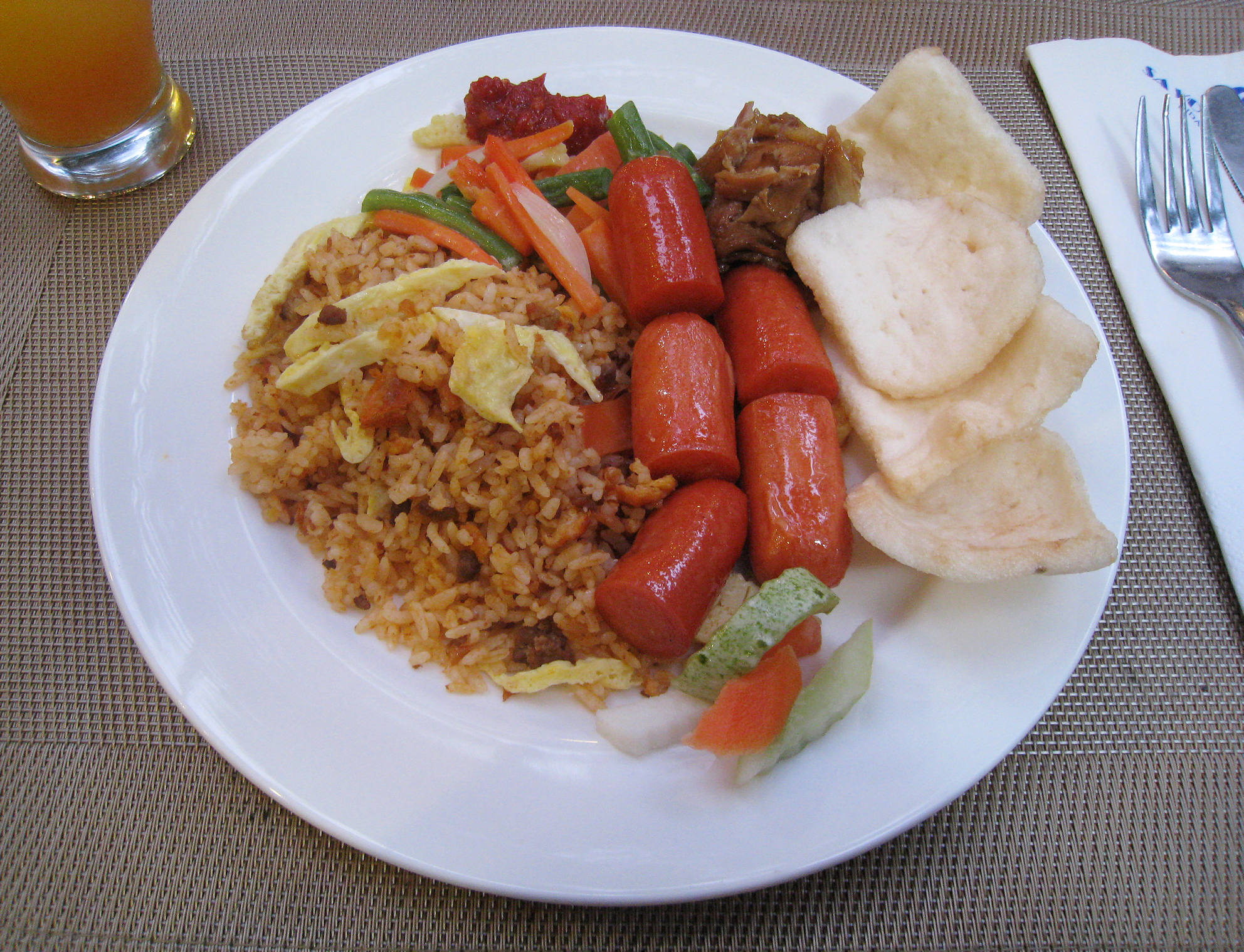
Nasi goreng istimewa, special fried rice

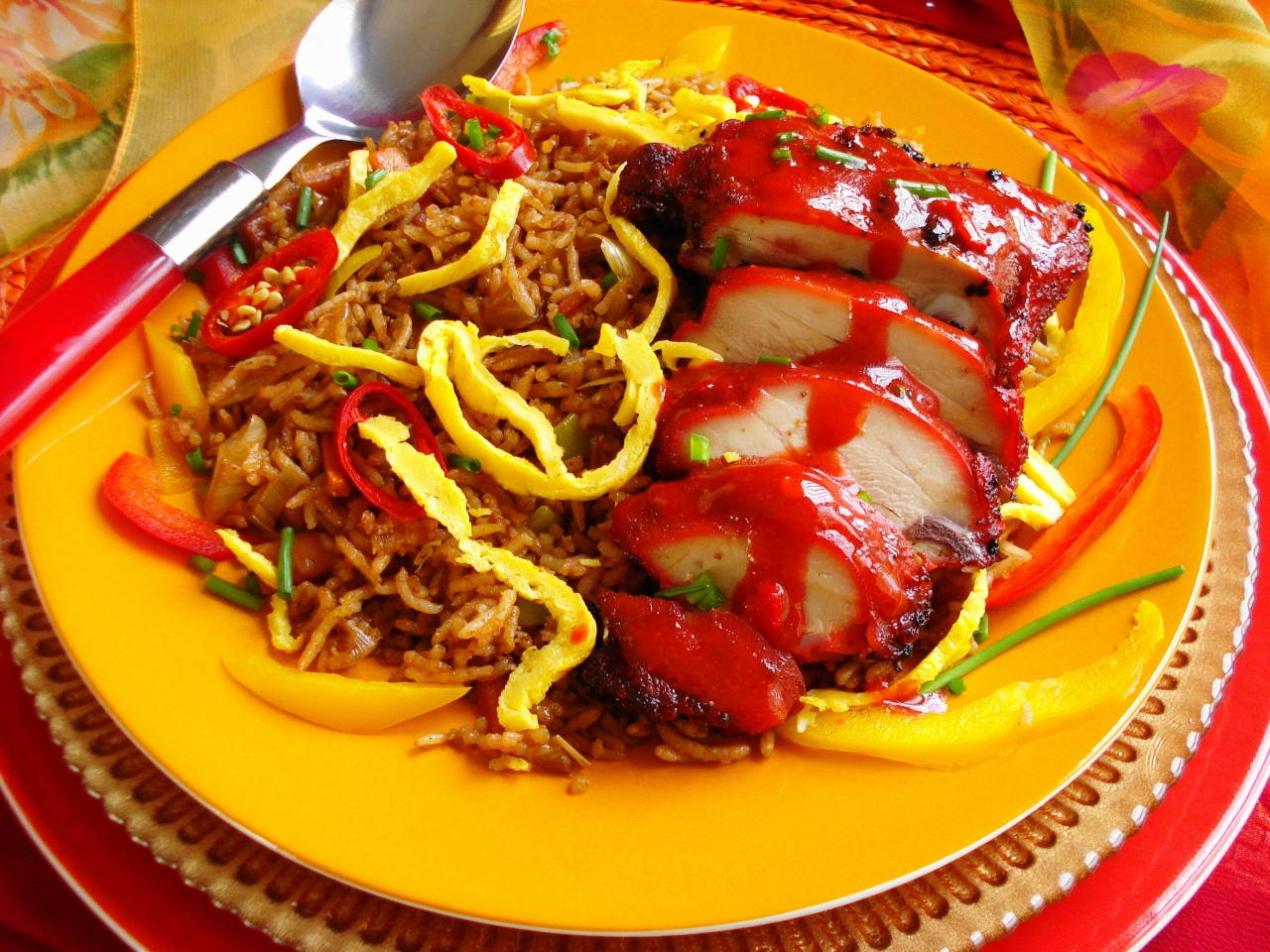
Javanese-Surinamese nasi goreng in The Netherlands

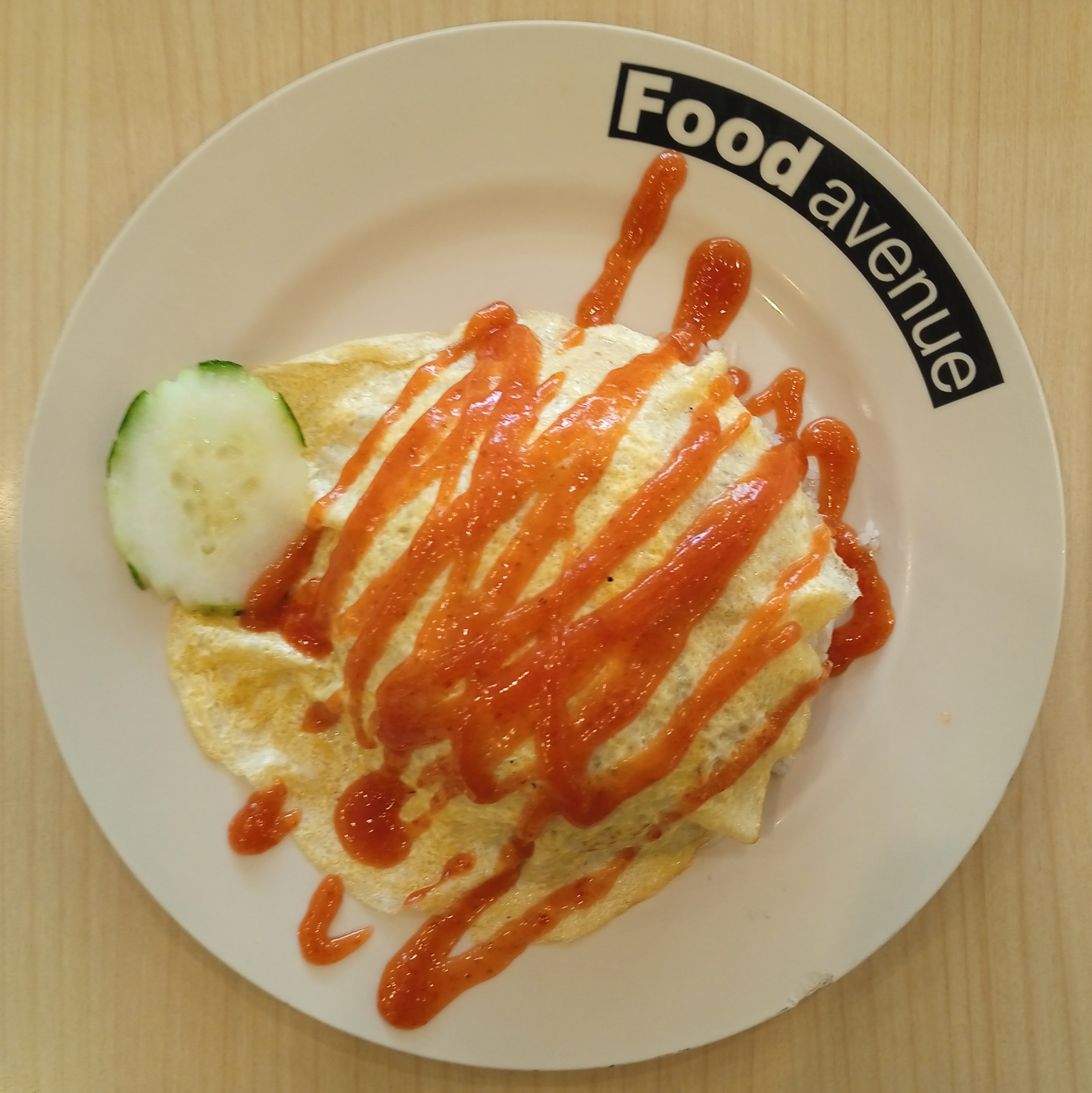
Nasi goreng pattaya, Malaysian omelette rice

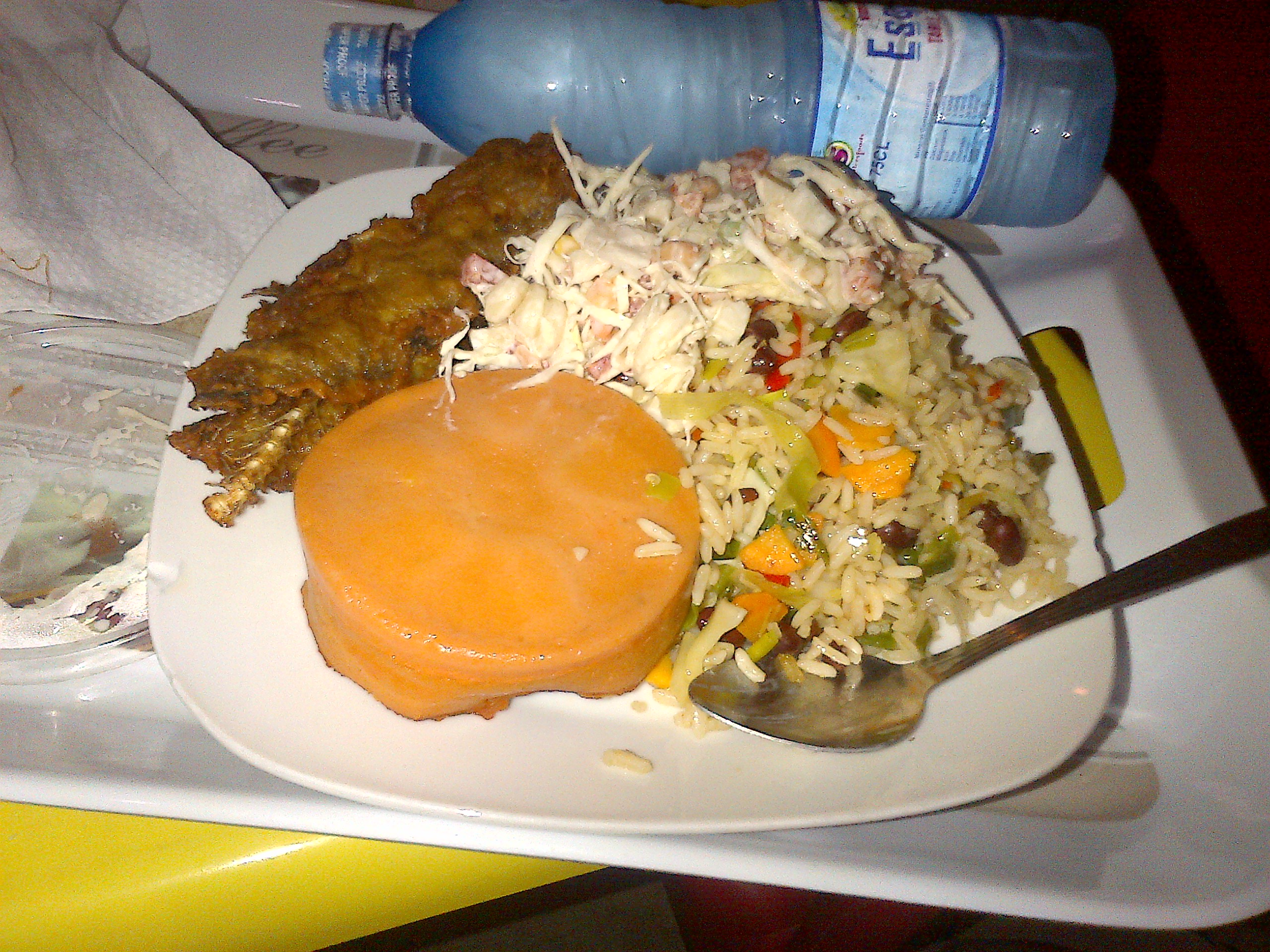
Nigerian fried rice with fish, salad and steamed bean pudding

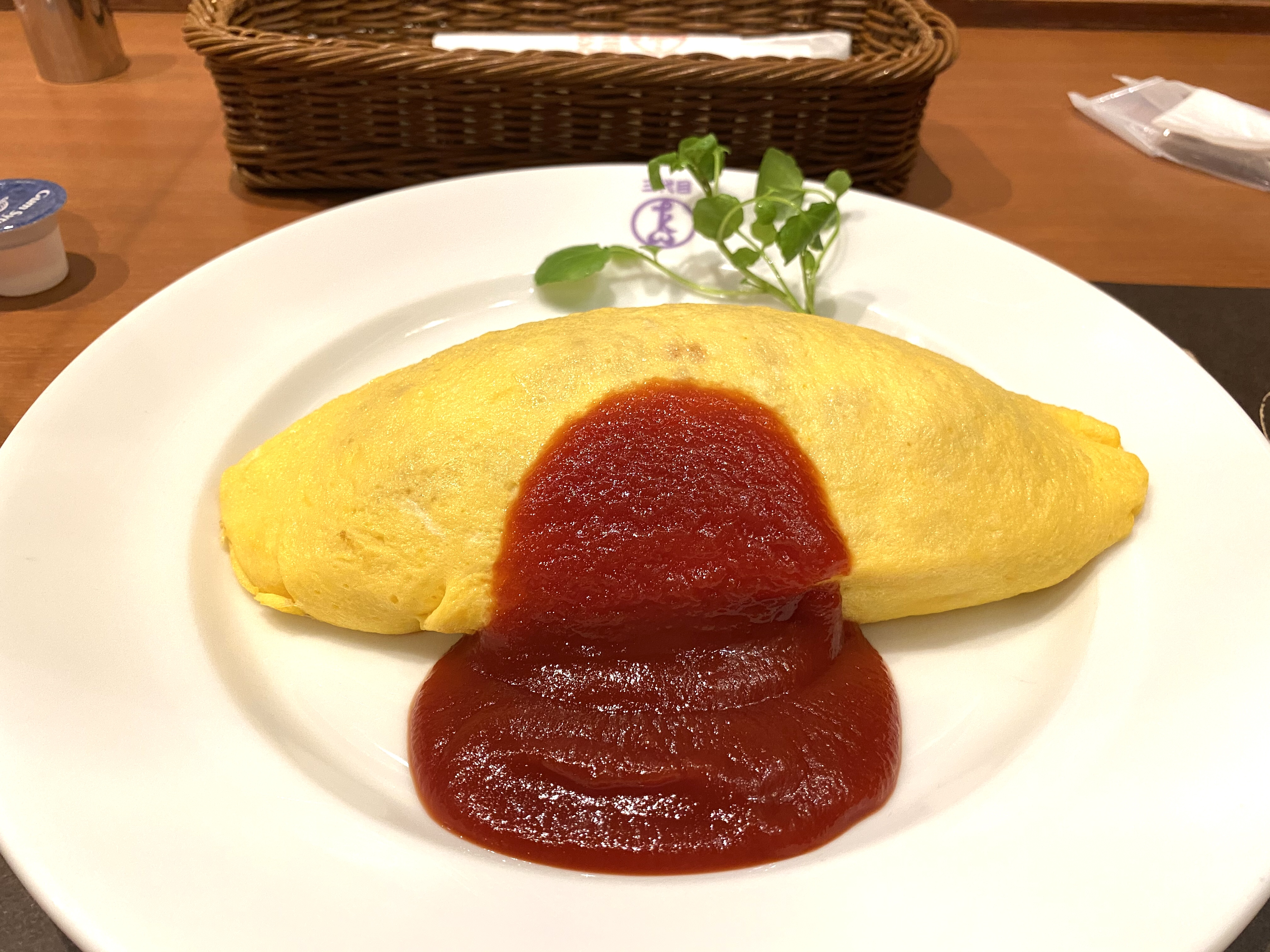
Omurice (Japanese omelette rice) with fried rice inside

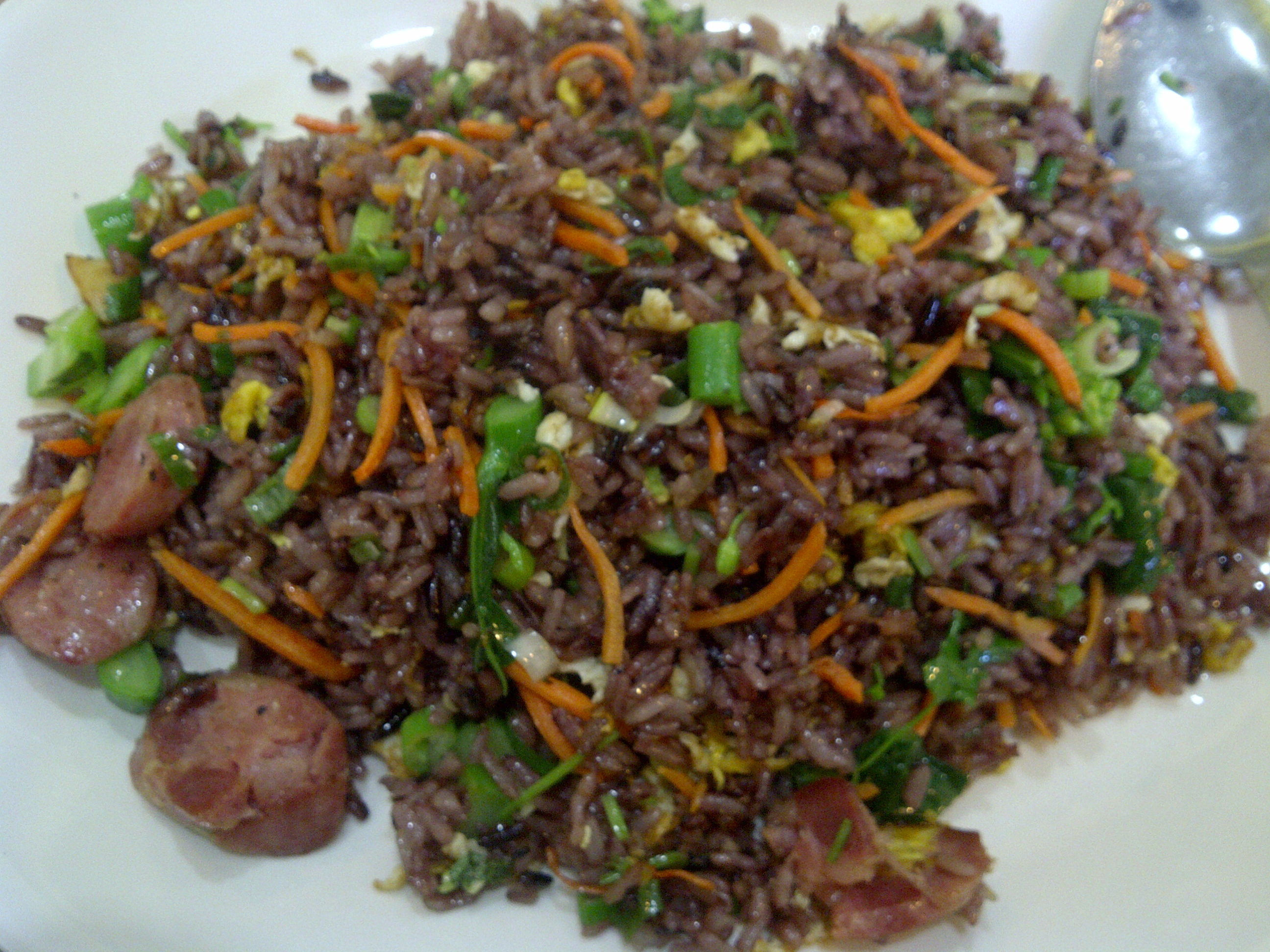
Taiwanese fried rice

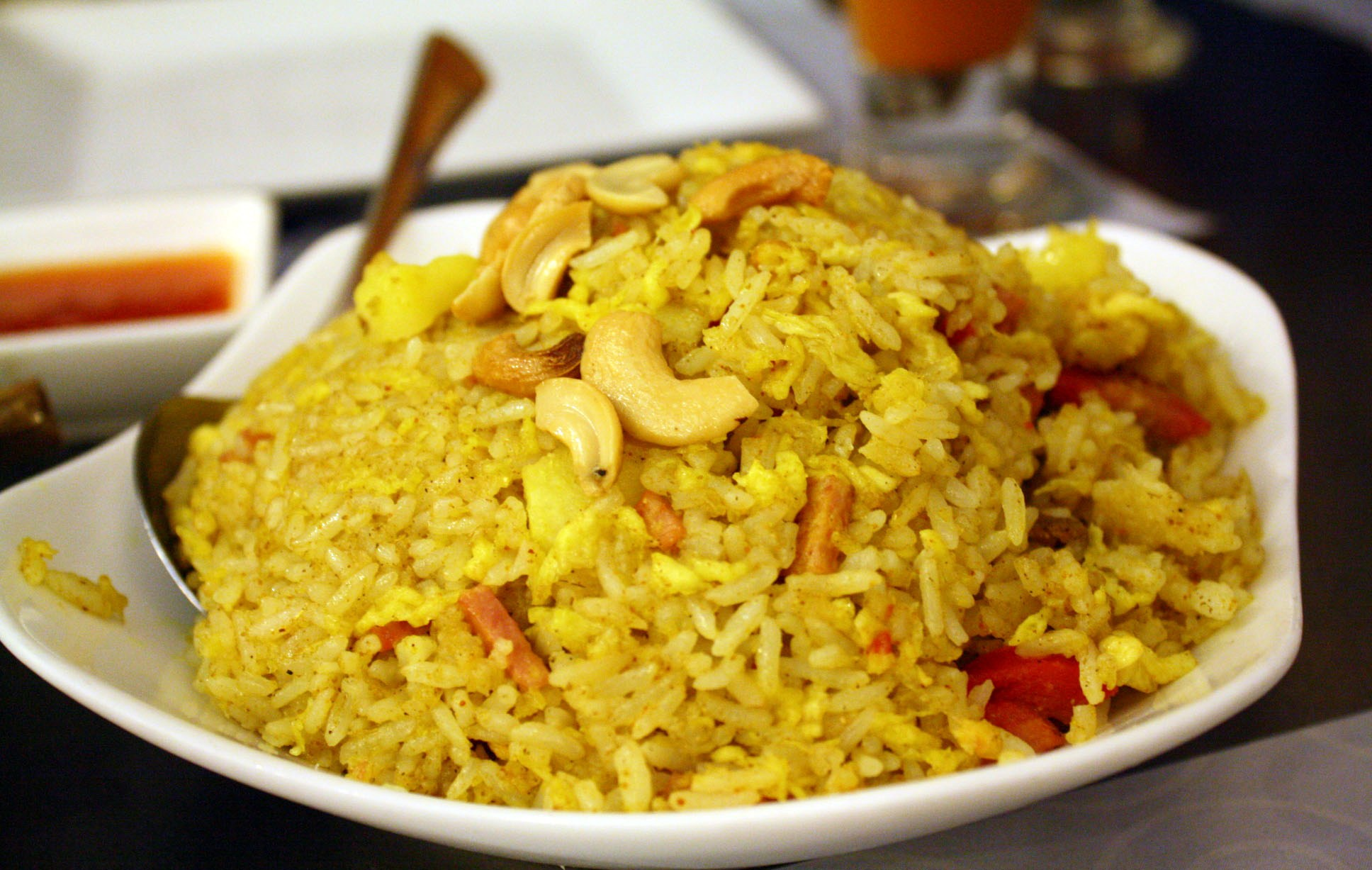
Filipino sinangág with cashews

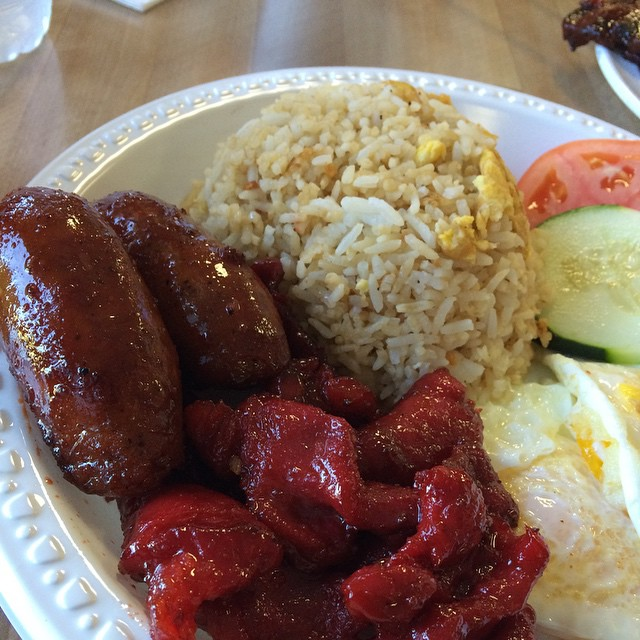
Filipino tosilog breakfast with tocino and longganisa

== See also ==
- Rice dishes
  - Arroz a la valenciana
  - Arroz con pollo
  - Arròs negre
  - Biryani
  - Bannu pulao
  - Jambalaya
  - Nam khao – a salad from Laos made with deep-fried rice balls and other ingredients
  - Paella
  - Pilaf
  - Risotto
  - Yam naem – a Thai salad prepared using fried curry rice and other ingredients
- Fried noodles
- Fried rice syndrome – food poisoning caused by Bacillus cereus
