= Cooked rice =

Steamed or boiled grain

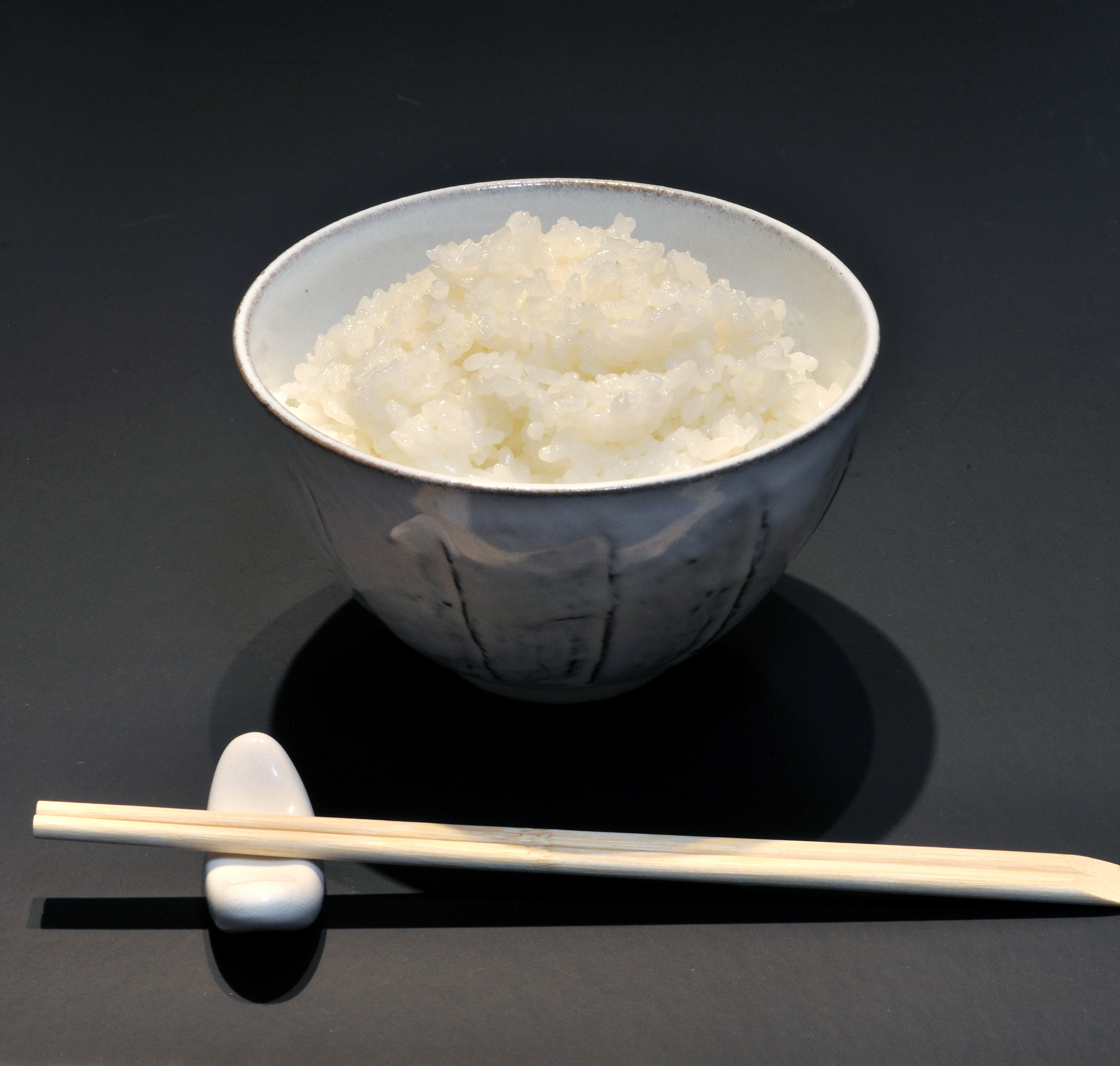
- A bowl of cooked white rice
- Main ingredients: Rice, water
- Food energy (per 1 serving): 85 kcal (360 kJ)
- Similar dishes: Bap, biryani, risotto

Cooked rice refers to rice that has been cooked either by steaming or boiling. The terms steamed rice or boiled rice are also commonly used. Any variant of Asian rice (both indica and japonica varieties), African rice or wild rice, glutinous or non-glutinous, long-, medium-, or short-grain, of any colour, can be used. Rice for cooking can be whole-grain or milled.

Cooked rice is used as a base for various fried rice dishes (e.g. Chinese fried rice, Thai fried rice), rice bowls/plates (e.g. bibimbap, chazuke, curry rice, dal bhat, donburi, loco moco, panta bhat, rice and beans, rice and gravy), rice porridges (e.g. congee, juk), rice balls/rolls (e.g. gimbap, onigiri, sushi, zongzi), as well as rice cakes and desserts (e.g. mochi, tteok, yaksik).

Rice is a staple food in not only Asia and Latin America, but across the globe, and is the most consumed foodstuff in the world. The U.S. Department of Agriculture classifies rice as part of the grains food group. Nutritionally, 200 g of cooked steamed white rice contributes 60 g (2 oz) toward the daily recommended 170 and 200 g (6 and 7 oz) of grains for women and men, respectively, and is considered a good source of micronutrients such as zinc and manganese.

== Preparation ==
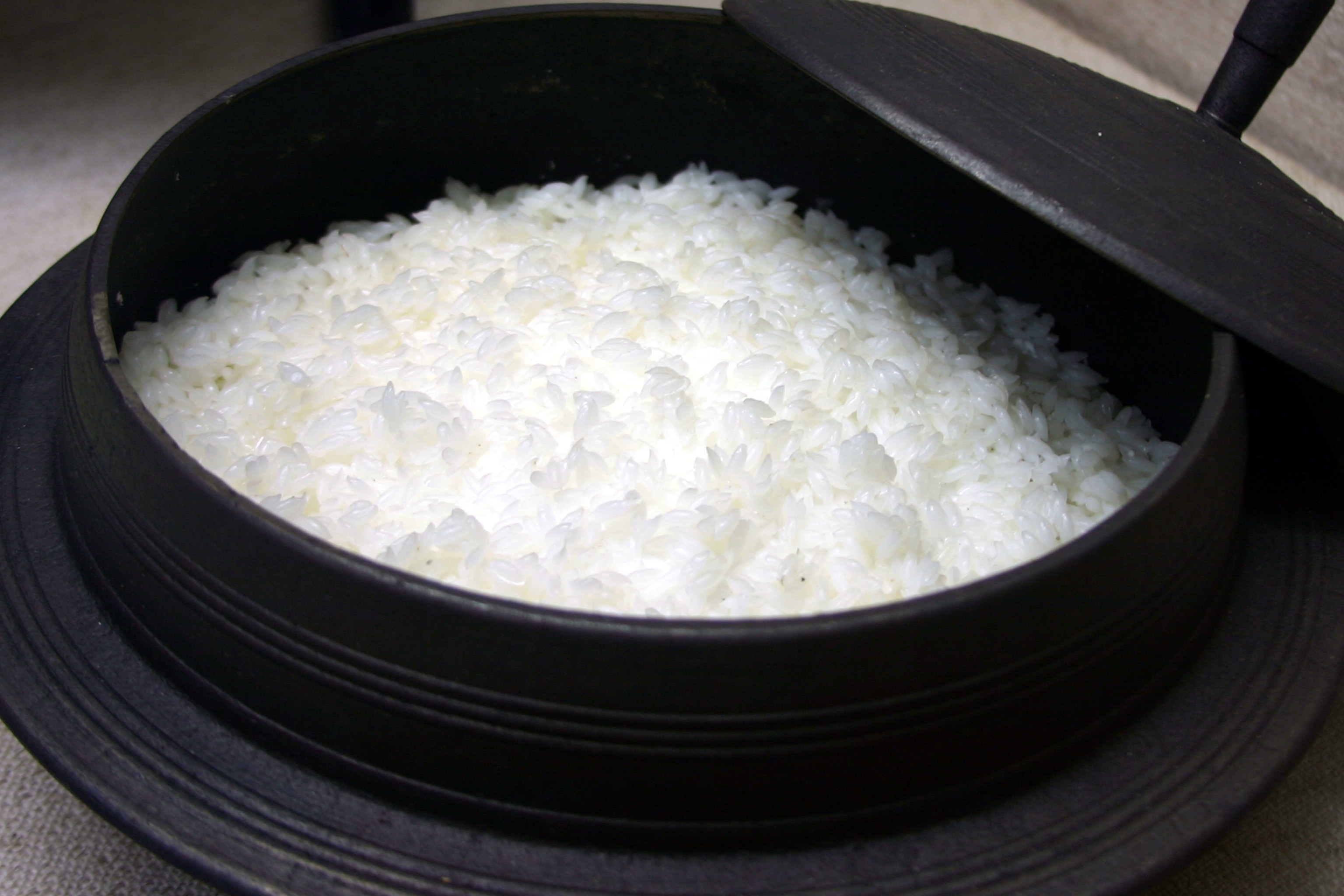
Boiled white Japonica rice in gamasot, a traditional Korean cauldron

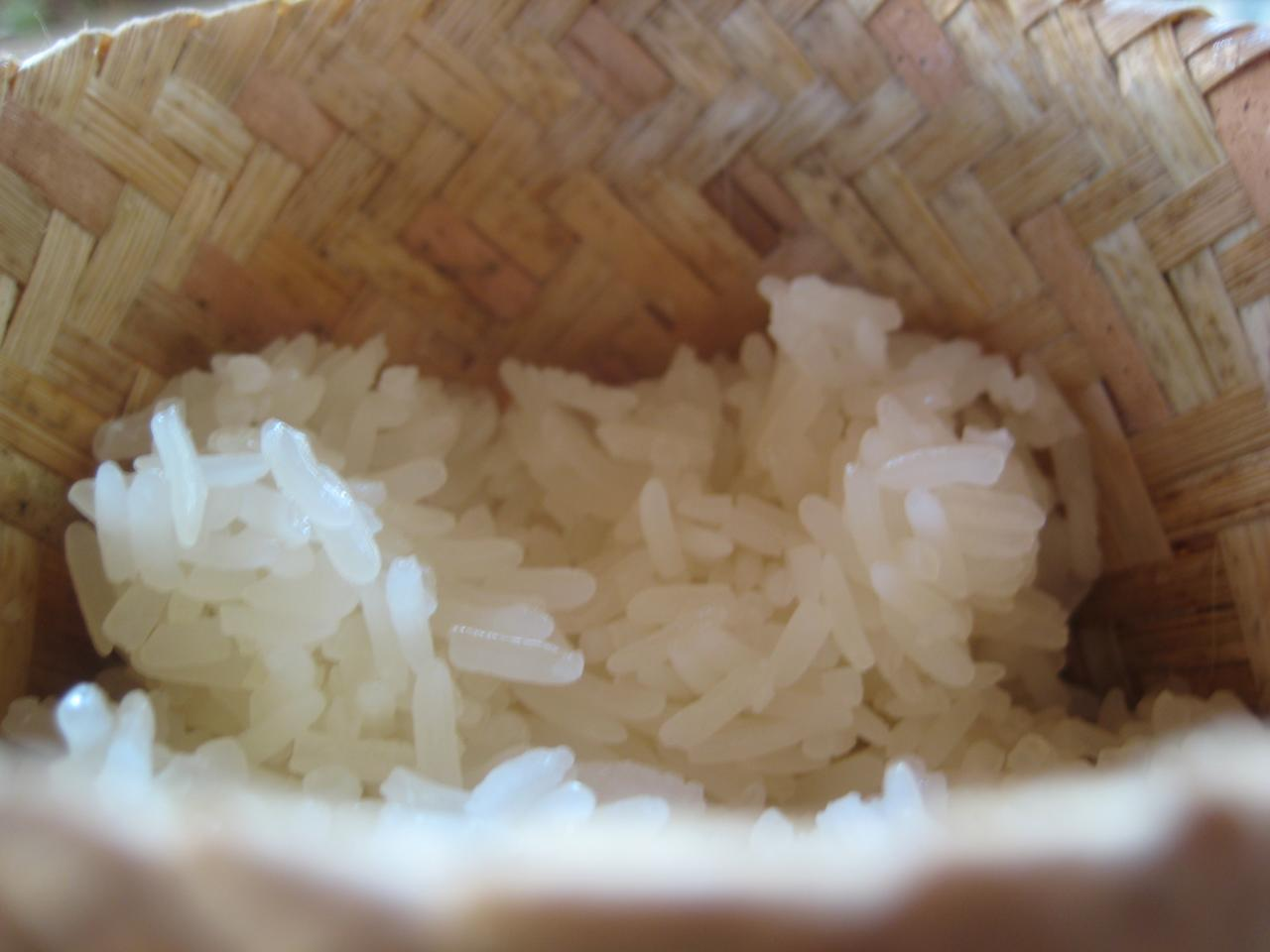
A close-up view of steamed Thai sticky rice in a traditional Lao rice steamer

Rice is often rinsed and soaked before being cooked. Unpolished brown rice requires longer soaking time than milled white rice does. The amount of water added can vary depending on many factors. Newly harvested rice usually requires less water, and softer varieties need more water than firmer varieties.

Rice can be boiled in a heavy-bottomed cookware or steamed in a food steamer. Some boiling methods do not require precise water measurements, as the rice is strained after boiling. This draining method is suitable for the less glutinous varieties such as basmati rice, but not suitable for varieties like japonica rice which become sticky to some degree when cooked. Optionally, a small amount of salt can be added before cooking. If not drained, boiled rice is usually cooked on high heat until a rolling boil, then simmered with the lid on, and steamed using the residual heat after turning off the heat source. Nowadays, electric rice cookers are also commonly used to cook rice. During cooking, rice absorbs water and increases in volume and mass.

== Use in dishes ==
In East Asia, cooked rice is most commonly served in individual bowls, with each diner receiving one. Food from local dishes is placed upon the rice, and is then eaten.

Cooked or boiled rice is used as an ingredient in many dishes. Leftover steamed rice is used to make porridge or fried rice dishes. Some common dishes using cooked rice as the main ingredient include:

- Fried rice dishes
  - Arroz chaufa
  - Bokkeum-bap
    - Kimchi fried rice
  - Chāhan
    - Omurice
  - Chinese fried rice
    - Hokkien fried rice
    - Yangzhou fried rice
    - Yin yang fried rice
  - Nasi goreng
    - Nasi goreng jawa
    - Nasi goreng pattaya
  - Omelette rice
  - Thai fried rice
    - American fried rice
- Rice bowls and plates
  - Bibimbap
    - Hoe-deopbap
  - Chazuke
  - Dal bhat
  - Donburi
    - Chūkadon
    - Gyūdon
    - Katsudon
    - Oyakodon
    - Unadon
    - Tekkadon
  - Hainanese chicken rice
  - Loco moco
  - Panta bhat
  - Red beans and rice
  - Rice and beans
  - Rice and curry (Sri Lanka)
  - Rice and gravy
  - Tumpeng
- Rice porridges
  - Congee/Juk
  - Champorado
- Rice balls and rolls
  - Gimbap
  - Jumeok-bap
  - Lemper
  - Onigiri
  - Rice ball salads
    - Nam khao
    - Yam naem
  - Sushi
    - B.C. roll
    - California roll
    - Dynamite roll
    - Philadelphia roll
    - Seattle roll
    - Spider roll
  - Zongzi
- Rice cakes and desserts
  - Mochi
  - Tteok
  - Yaksik
  - Yeot
  - "puto"

== Use in beverages ==
- Alcoholic
  - Amazake
  - Awamori
  - Cheongju
    - Beopju
  - Choujiu
  - Gamju
  - Hariya
  - Huangjiu
    - Mijiu
    - Shaoxing wine
  - Lao-Lao
  - Makgeolli
  - Rượu cần
  - Sake
  - Sato
  - Shōchū
  - Soju
  - Sonti
- Non-alcoholic
  - Sikhye

== Varieties ==
Most common is plain, steamed white rice; however, a number of varieties and are served, many with specific cooking methods. Some varieties include:

- Japonica rice
- Jasmine rice
- Sticky rice
- Sushi rice (cooked with the addition of Japanese rice vinegar and sugar)
- Basmati rice

== Gallery ==
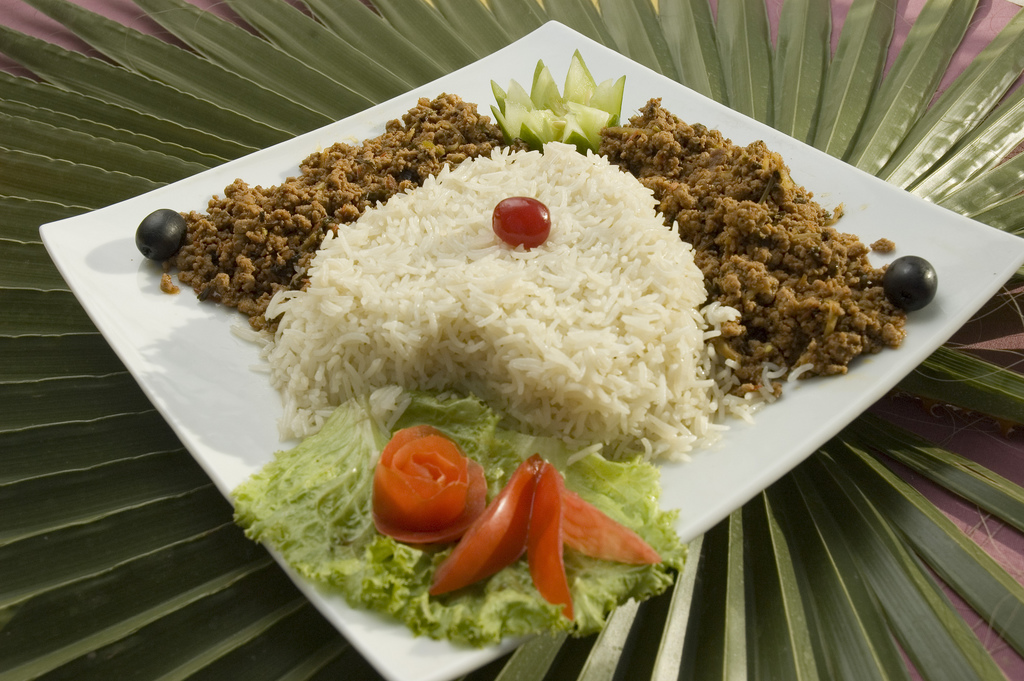
A dish of keema served with cooked rice in Karachi, Pakistan

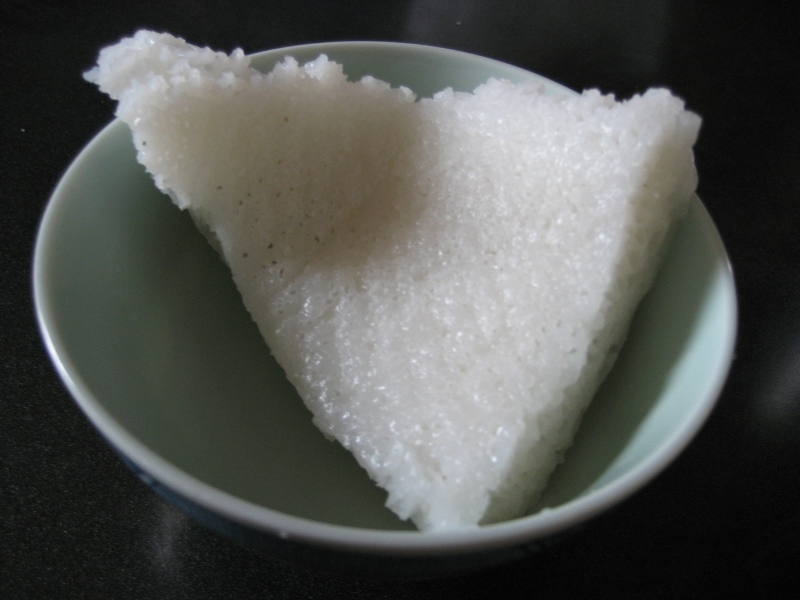
A cooked rice cake

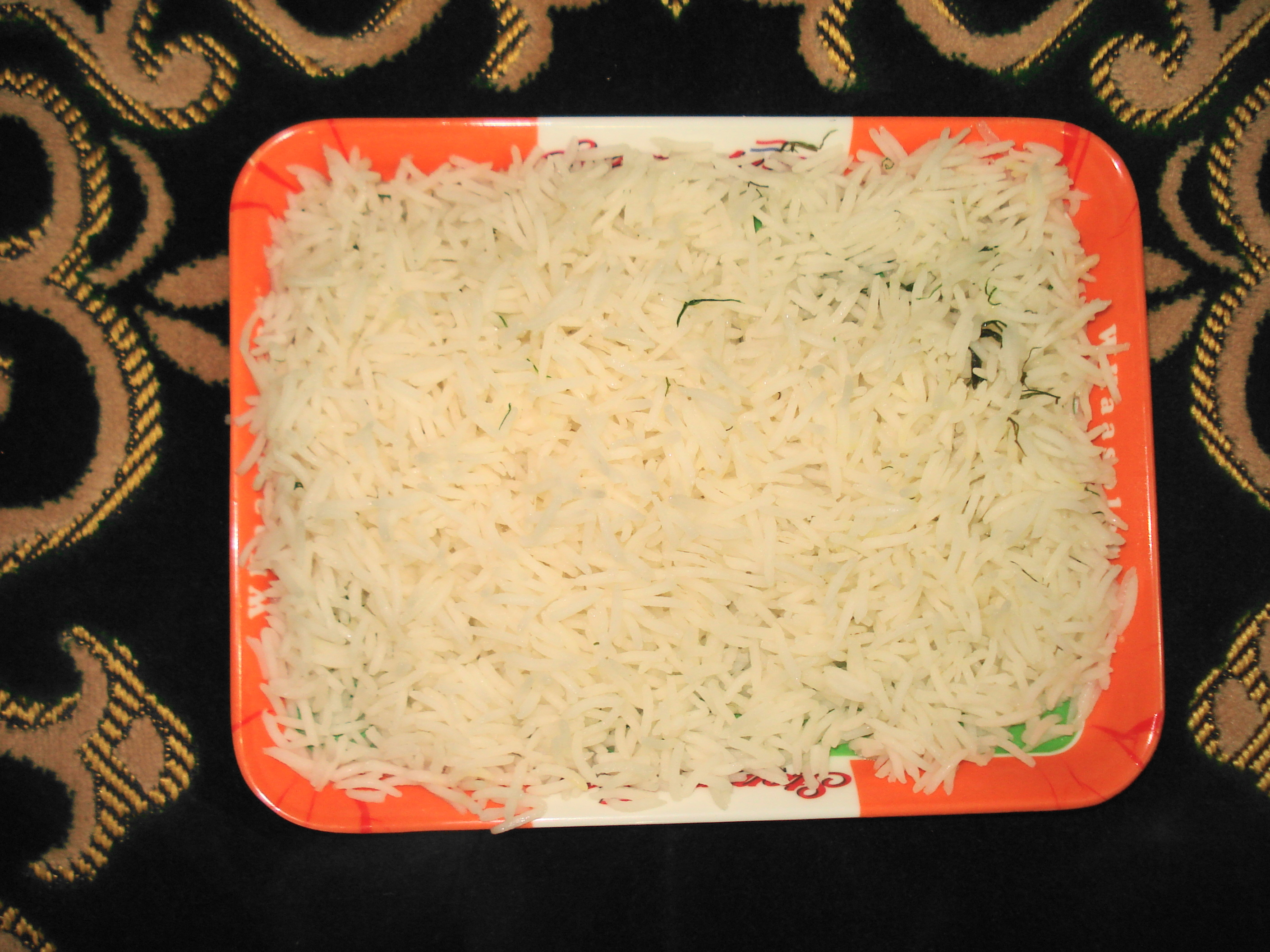
Boiled rice

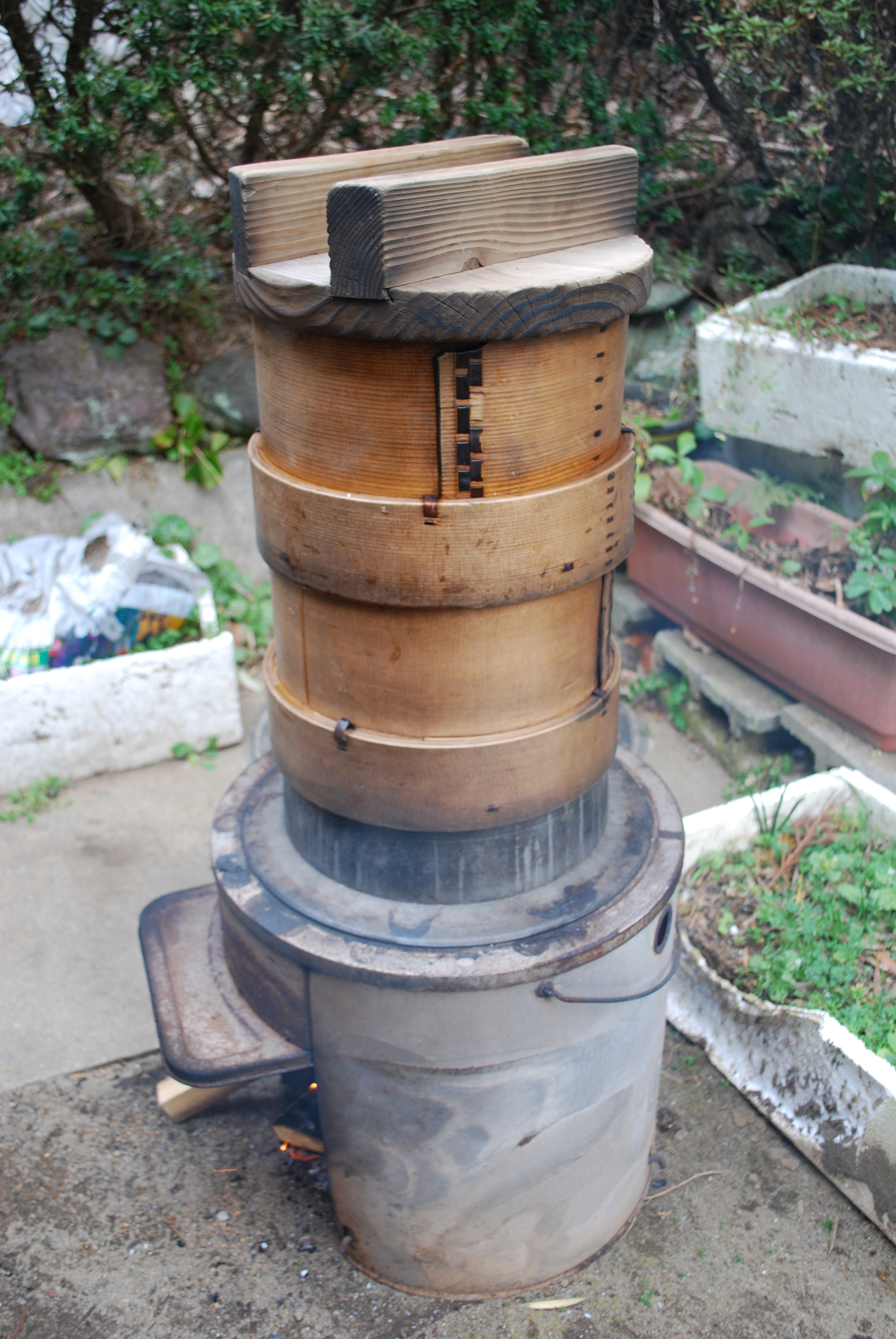
A Japanese bamboo glutinous rice steamer

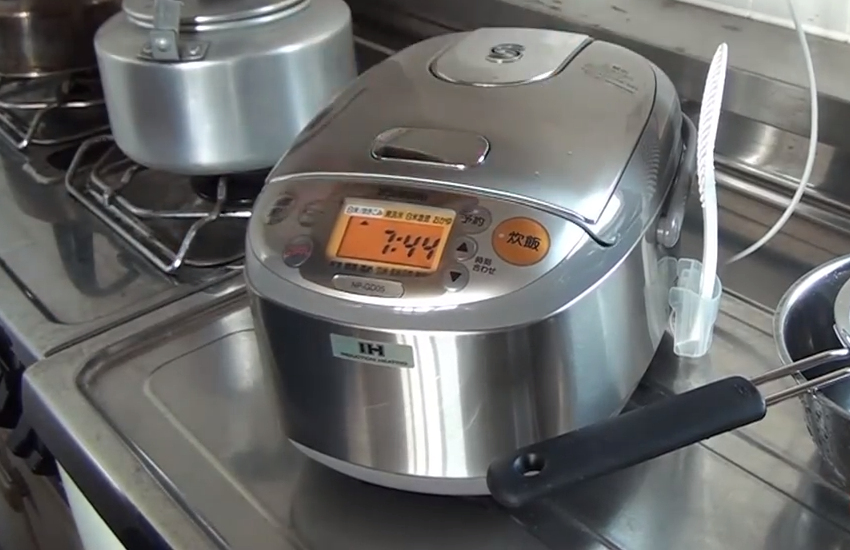
A modern rice cooker

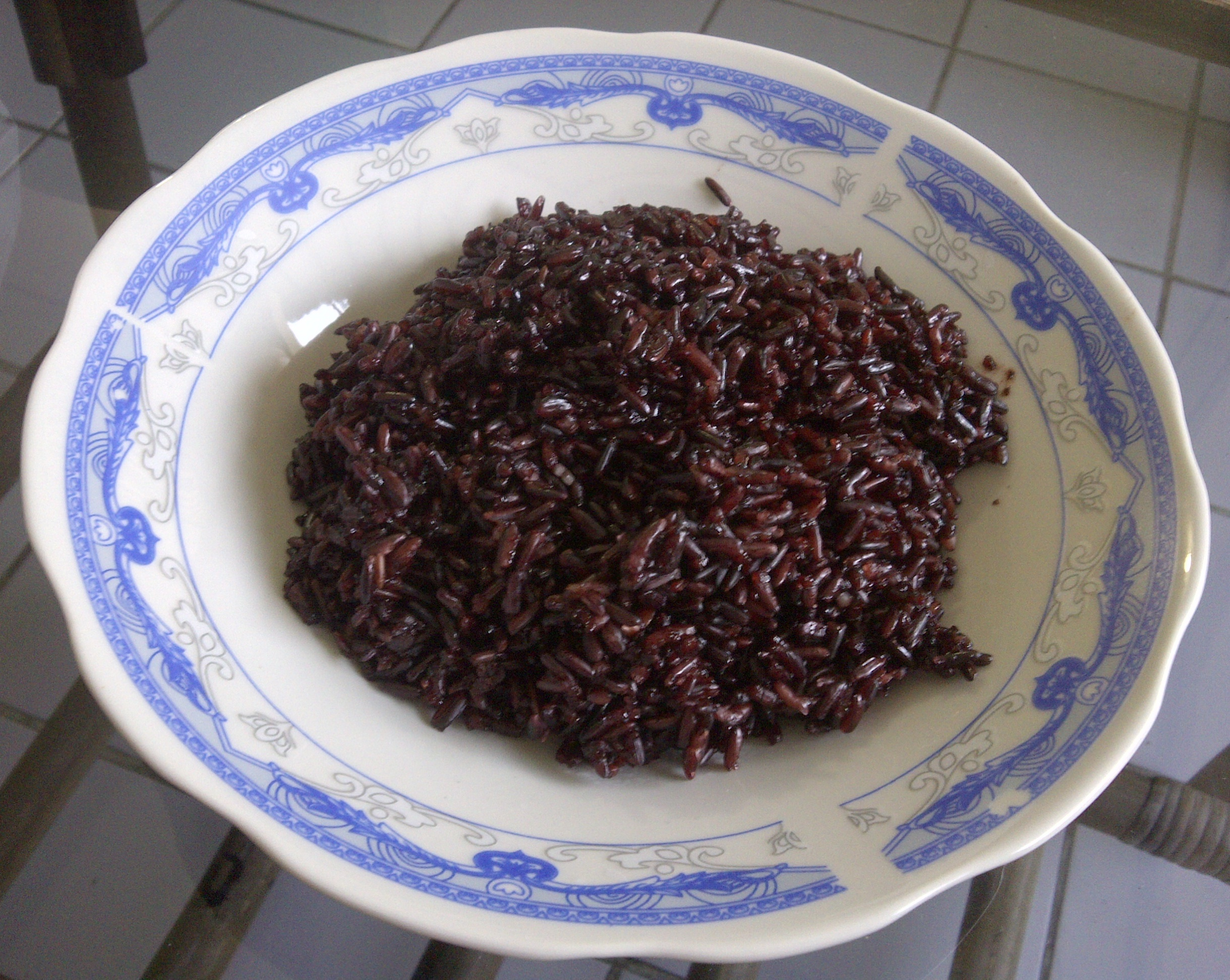
Non-glutenous cooked black rice

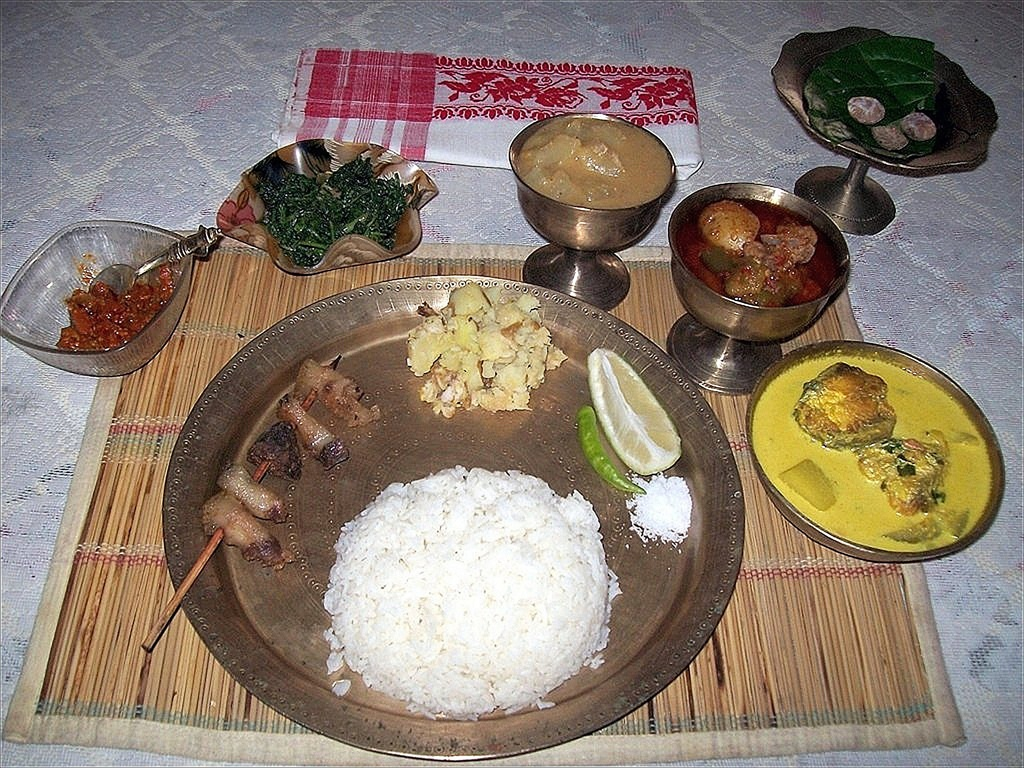
Rice served with vegetables and curries in Assam, India

== See also ==
- Bap
- Food steamer
- List of rice dishes
- List of steamed foods
- Pilaf
