= Bokkeum-bap =

Korean fried rice dish

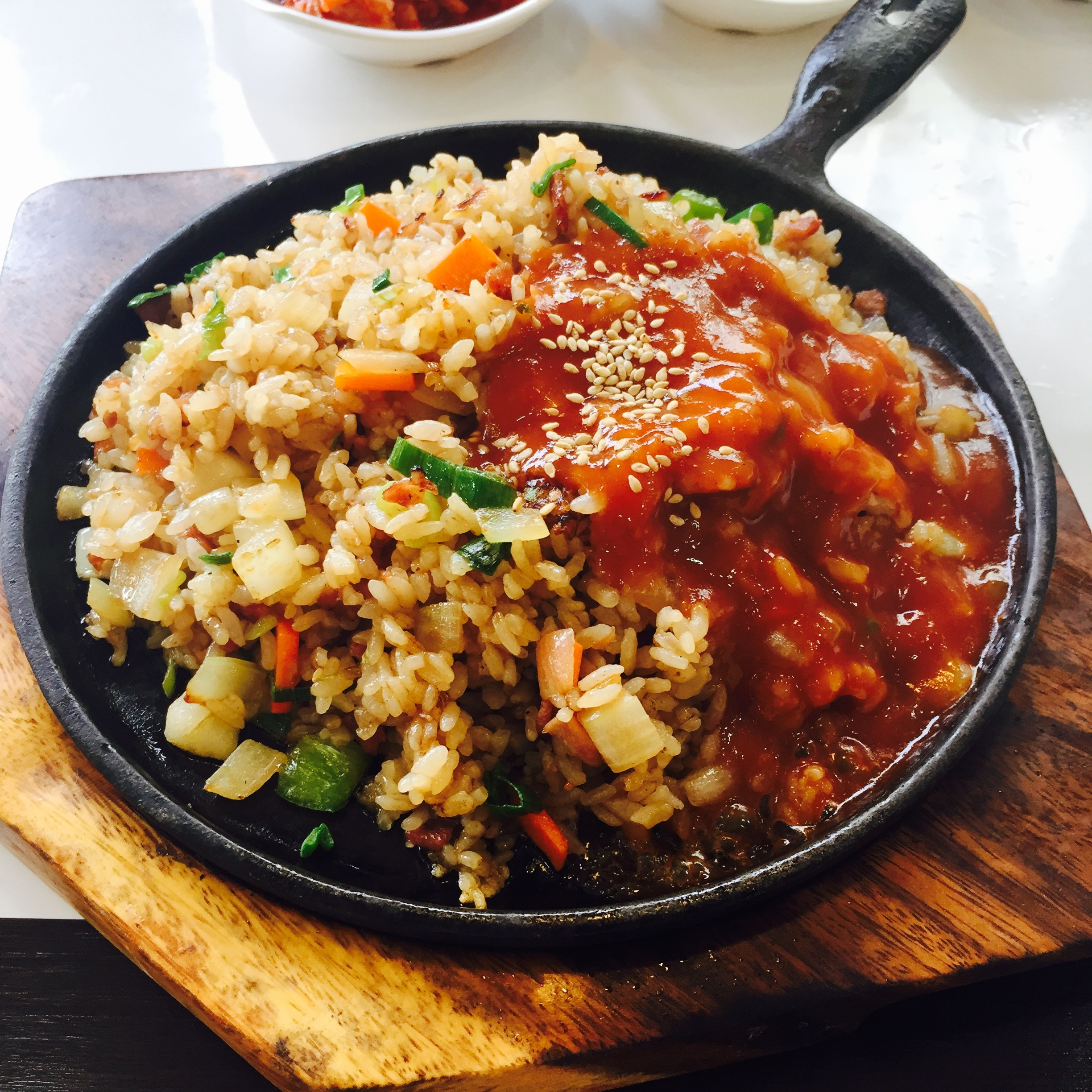
- Alternative names: Fried rice
- Type: Bokkeum (stir-fried dish); Fried rice
- Place of origin: Korea
- Associated cuisine: Korean
- Main ingredients: Bap (cooked rice)
- Variations: Kimchi-bokkeum-bap (kimchi fried rice)
- Similar dishes: Chāhan, chǎofàn, khao phat, nasi goreng

Korean name
- Hangul: 볶음밥
- RR: bokkeumbap
- MR: pokkŭmbap
- IPA: po.k͈ɯm.bap̚

Bokkeum-bap (Korean: 볶음밥) or fried rice is a Korean dish made by stir-frying bap (cooked rice) with other ingredients in oil. The name of the most prominent ingredient other than cooked rice often appears at the very front of the name of the dish, as in kimchi-bokkeum-bap (kimchi fried rice).

== Varieties ==
=== As an add-on ===
In Korean restaurants, fried rice is a popular end-of-meal add-on. Diners may say "bap bokka juseyo" (밥 볶아 주세요. literally "Please fry rice.") after eating main dishes cooked on a tabletop stove, such as dak-galbi (spicy stir-fried chicken) or nakji-bokkeum (stir-fried octopus), then cooked rice along with gimgaru (seaweed flakes) and sesame oil will be added directly into the remains of the main dish, stir-fried and scorched.

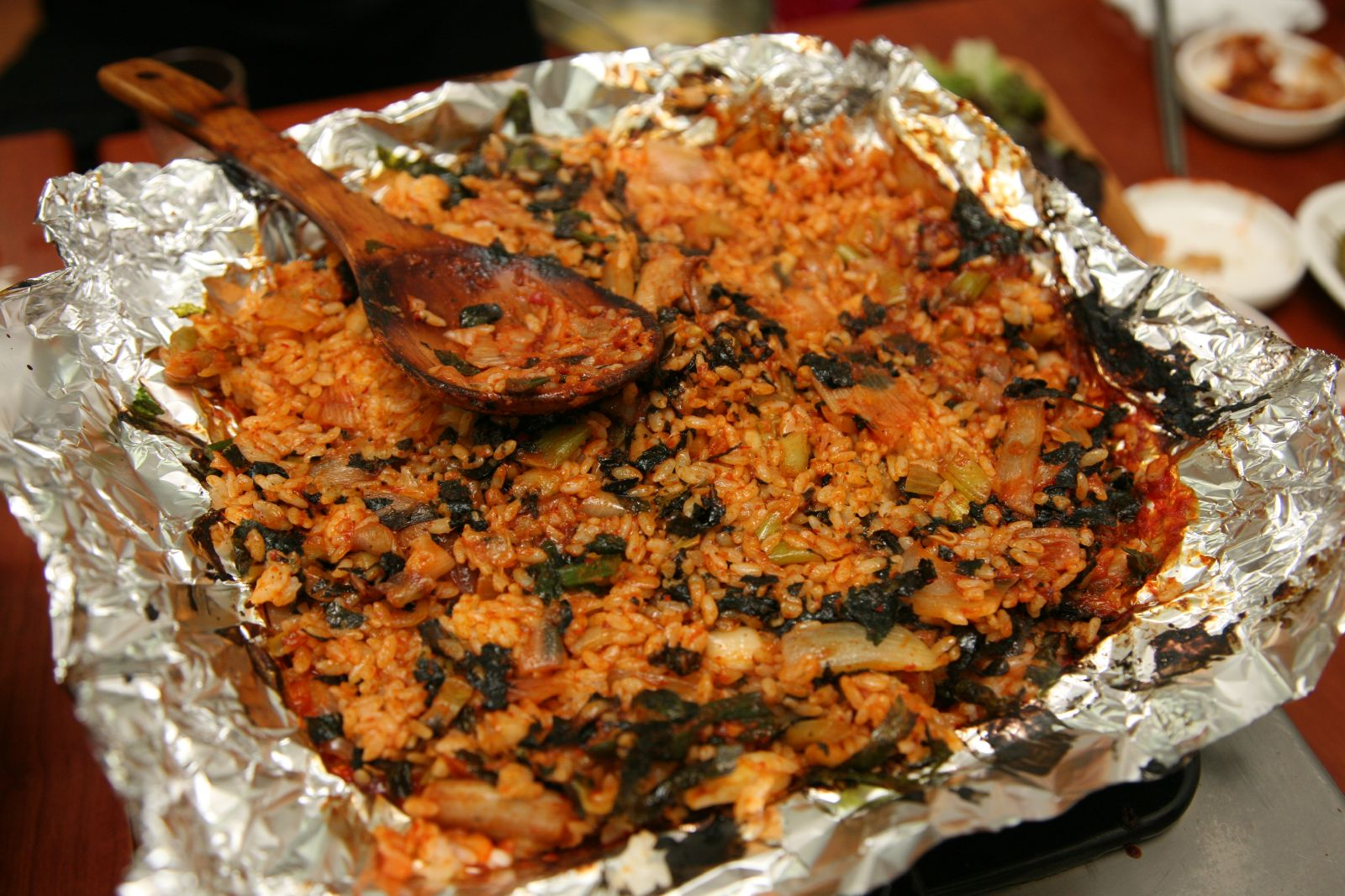
Scorching fried rice with the remains of stir-fried hagfish

=== By ingredients ===
The name of the most prominent ingredient other than cooked rice often appears at the very front of the name of the dish. Kimchi-bokkeum-bap (kimchi fried rice), beoseot-bokkeum-bap (mushroom fried rice), saeu-bokkeum-bap (shrimp fried rice) are some examples. When there is no main or special ingredient, the dish is usually called either bokkeum-bap (fried rice) or yachae-bokkeum-bap (vegetable fried rice).

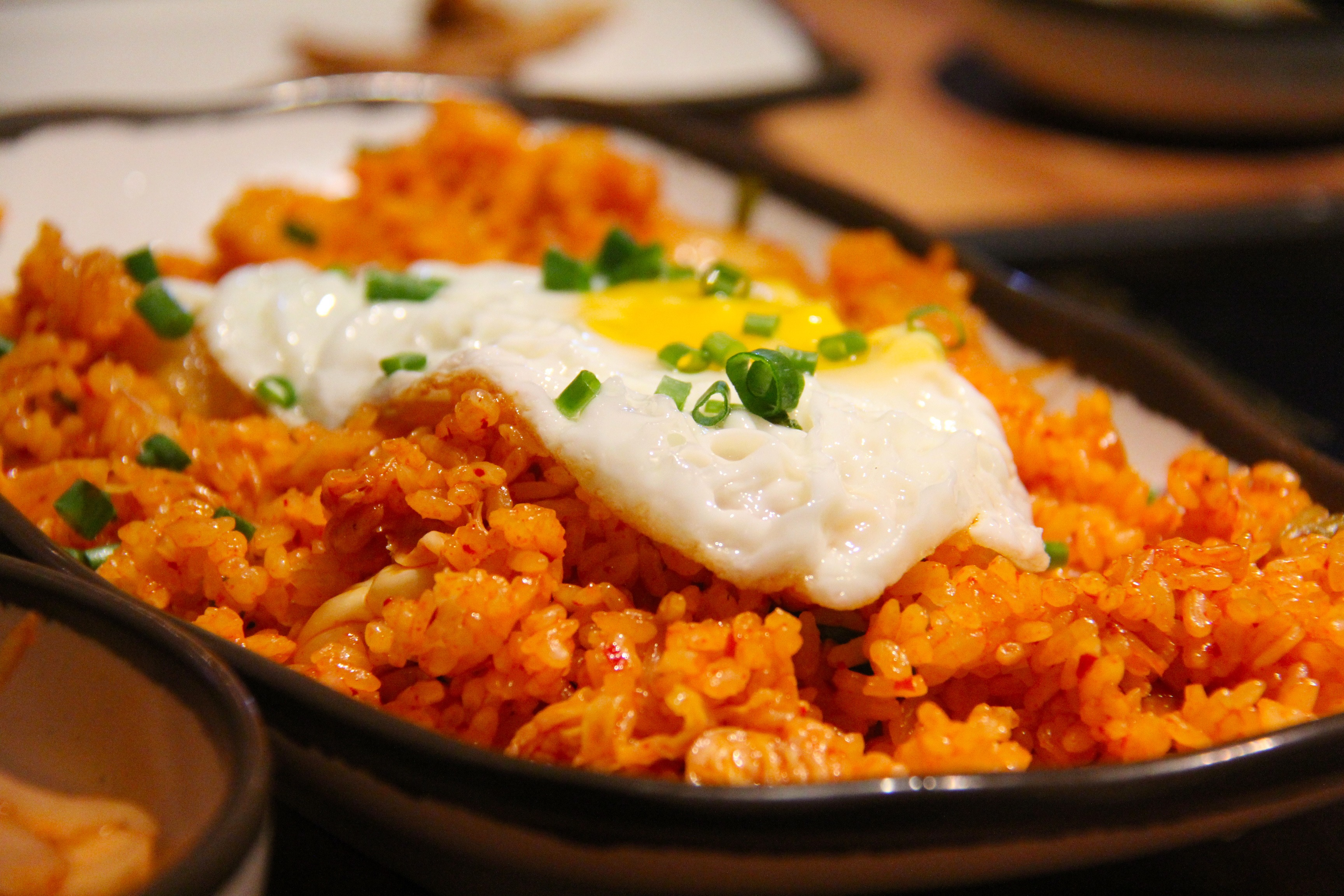
Kimchi fried rice with a fried egg on top

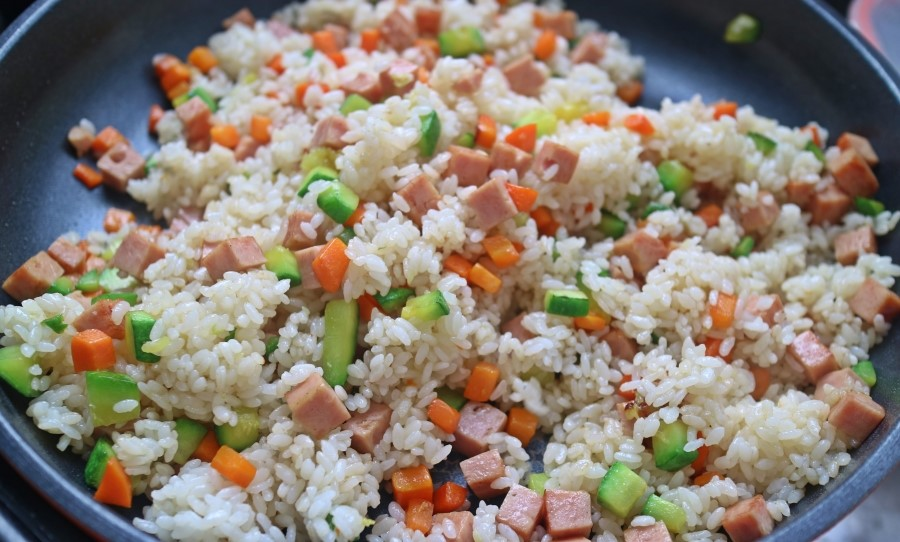
Stir-frying vegetable fried rice in a frying pan

=== By style ===
Korean Chinese fried rice, often called junggukjip bokkeum-bap (중국집 볶음밥; "Chinese restaurant fried rice") in South Korea, is characterized by the smoky flavor from the use of a wok on high heat, eggs scrambled or fried in the scallion-infused oil, and the Sweet bean sauce sauce (a thick black sauce used in jajangmyeon) served with the dish.

Another popular dish, cheolpan-bokkeum-bap (철판 볶음밥; "iron griddle fried rice") is influenced by the style of Japanese teppanyaki. The Japanese word teppan (鉄板; "iron griddle") and the Korean word cheolpan (철판; "iron griddle") are cognates, sharing the same Chinese characters.

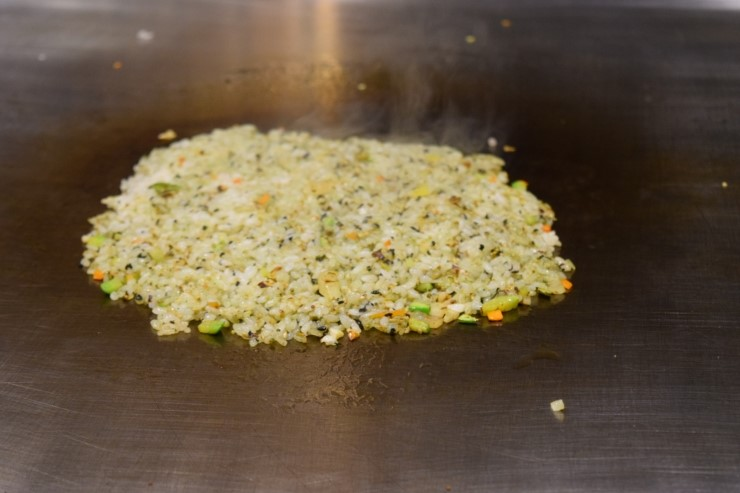
Iron griddle fried rice

== See also ==
- Chāhan
- Chǎofàn
- Khao phat
- Nasi goreng
