= Chinese fried rice =

Family of fried rice dishes

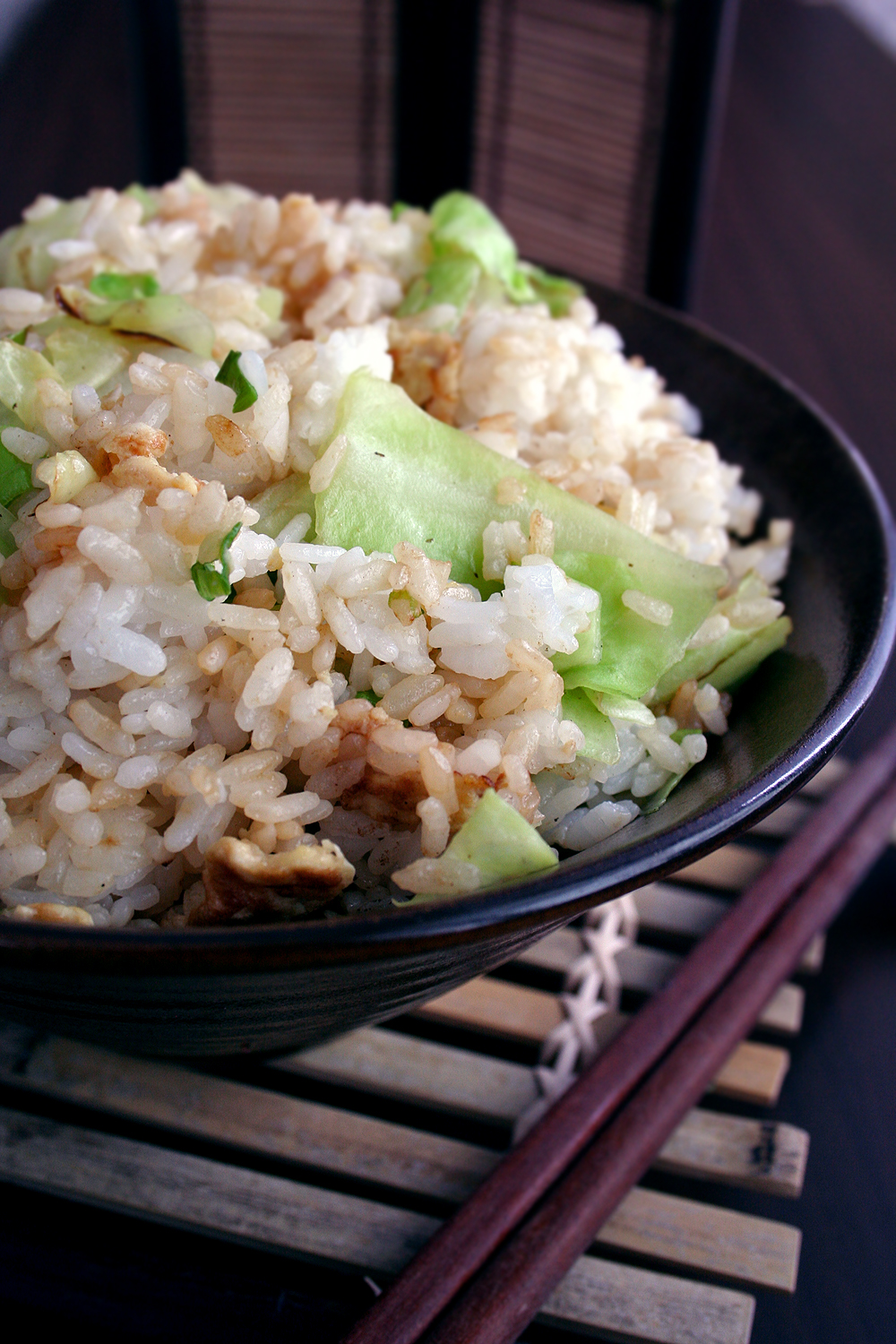
- Type: Fried rice
- Place of origin: China
- Region or state: Greater China
- Main ingredients: Cooked rice
- Variations: Hokkien fried rice, Yangzhou fried rice, yin yang fried rice

Chinese fried rice
- Traditional Chinese: 炒飯
- Simplified Chinese: 炒饭
- Literal meaning: fried rice
Transcriptions
Standard Mandarin
- Hanyu Pinyin: chǎofàn
- Bopomofo: ㄔㄠˇ ㄈㄢˋ
- Wade–Giles: ch'ao^{3}-fan^{4}
- Tongyong Pinyin: chǎo-fàn
- IPA: [ʈʂʰàʊ.fân]
Yue: Cantonese
- Jyutping: caau2 faan6
- IPA: [tsʰaw˧˥ fan˨]
Southern Min
- Hokkien POJ: chhá-pn̄g

Chinese fried rice (Note: simplified Chinese: 炒饭; traditional Chinese: 炒飯; pinyin: chǎofàn; Jyutping: caau2 faan6; Pe̍h-ōe-jī: chhá-pn̄g; Zhuyin Fuhao: ㄔㄠˇ ㄈㄢˋ) is a family of fried rice dishes popular in Greater China and around the world. It is sometimes served as the penultimate dish in Chinese banquets, just before dessert.

== History ==
The earliest record of fried rice is found in the Sui dynasty (589–618 CE). Though the stir-frying technique used for fried rice was recorded in a much earlier period, it was only in the late Ming dynasty (1368–1644 CE) that the technique became widely popular.

Fried rice is believed to have started as a way to accommodate leftovers. Traditionally, Southern Chinese prefer their rice polished and plain, as a base staple to eat with meat and vegetables. The vegetables, meat and rice leftovers from the day before—which have passed their prime but are still good to consume, and too good to be fed to animals—are seasoned with soy sauce, lard and garlic, and stir-fried, making a hot meal.

The basic elements of Chinese fried rice include rice, meat and vegetables, soy sauce and garlic. A number of fried rice recipes have been developed in China, such as Yangzhou and Sichuan fried rice. Leftover cooked rice among the Cantonese is commonly made into fried rice, prepared with chopped vegetables and meat. It is believed that the basic stir-fried technique to cook fried rice, which required Chinese wok, spread from Southern China to other rice farming cultures in East and Southeast Asia.

== Ingredients and preparation ==
Cooking Chinese fried rice video for a Western audience

The basic elements of Chinese fried rice are cooked rice, meat, and vegetables mixed with egg, soy sauce and garlic for flavour and seasoning; also cooking oil for greasing, either lard, vegetable oil or sesame oil. The oil and soy sauce grease and coat the rice grains, thus preventing them from burning and sticking to the cooking vessel. Sometimes chopped scallion, ginger, chili pepper and mushroom, and also diced processed pork, are added to the mixture. All ingredients are stir-fried on a strong fire in a wok, and the rice is turned, stirred and agitated using a spatula to evenly cook the rice and distribute the seasoning. Leftover rice is commonly used, and the dish can incorporate other leftover ingredients as well.

== Variants ==
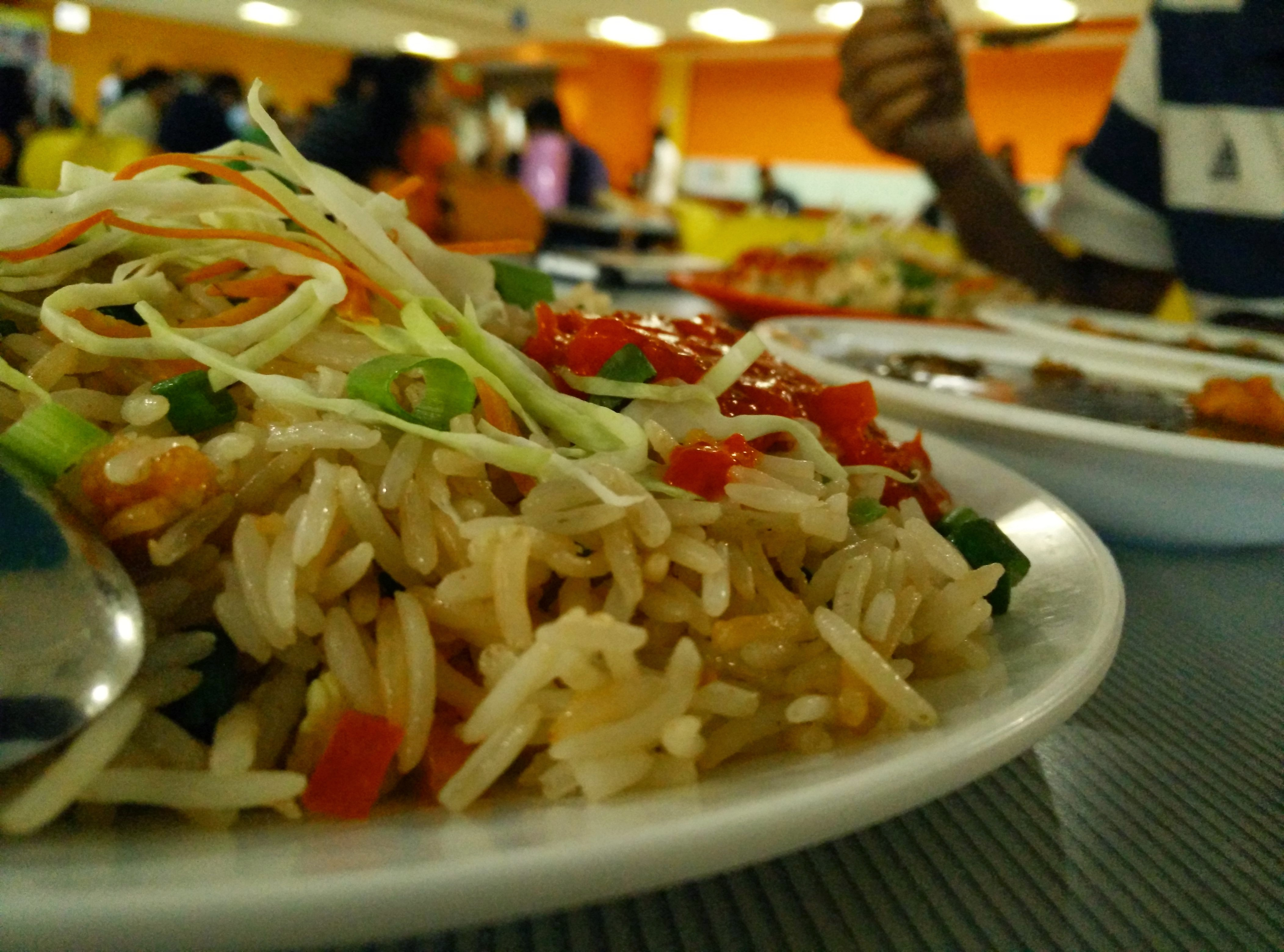
Spicy fried rice is also found in Indian cuisine.

The main ingredients of basic Chinese fried rice are cooked rice, stir-fried with chopped vegetables and meat, seasoned with soy sauce and garlic. Started as a humble and simple way to cook leftovers, initially there is no single exact recipe for fried rice in Chinese cuisine tradition, since any different leftovers and additional ingredients could lead to another different recipe. Each household might have its own way to cook fried rice. Varieties differ in the contents, seasonings, and spices. This versatility and its economic value to save food has led to the popularity of stir-fried rice in China.

Today, many recipes for Chinese fried rice exist. This includes regional varieties such as Yangzhou fried rice (扬州炒饭; Yángzhōu chǎofàn) from Yangzhou, Hokkien fried rice (Chinese: 福建炒飯; Fuk^{1}gin^{3} caau^{2}faan^{6}) from Fujian, and spicy Sichuan fried rice from Sichuan. Sichuan fried rice is notable for its tangy, hot and spicy flavour owed to doubanjiang chili sauce mixed with garlic, green and red onion.

== Outside China ==
Chinese fried rice dishes have spread to other parts of the world. The stir-frying technique that requires the use of a Chinese wok, and the use of soy sauce as a seasoning in fried rice, spread to neighboring East Asian countries, the Southeast Asian region, and subsequently the rest of the world. For example, Japanese chāhan (チャーハン; 炒飯) originated from the fried rice made by Chinese immigrants in the 19th century. Despite having distinctly stronger flavour, Indonesian nasi goreng is also believed to have been initially influenced by Chinese fried rice.

Latin American countries also have versions of Chinese fried rice, such as arroz chaufa (Chinese Peruvian fried rice) and arroz frito (Cuban-Chinese fried rice and Puerto Rican-Chinese fried rice). Indian pulao is also influenced by Chinese fried rice.

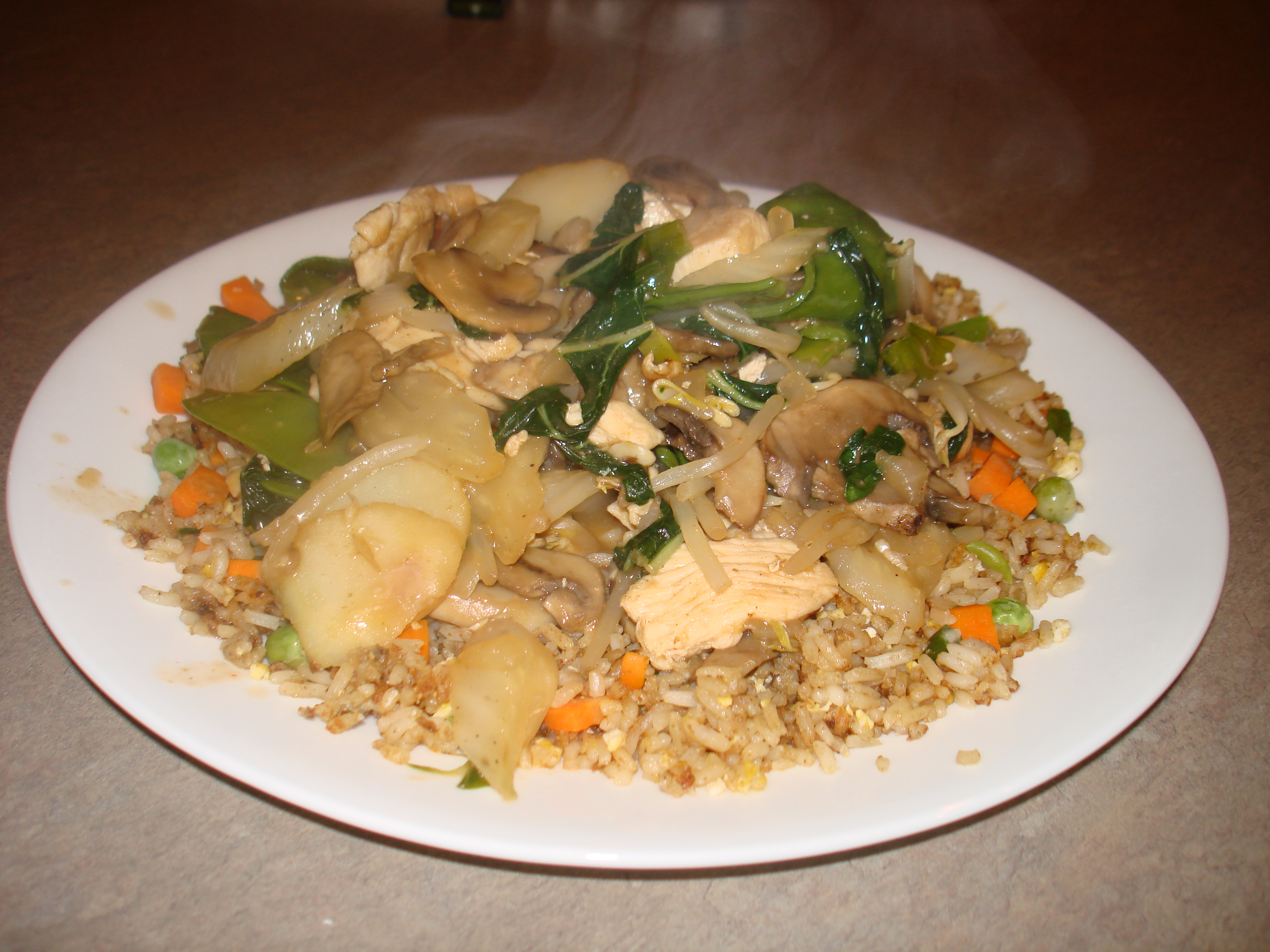
Chop suey served on top of fried rice in a Chinese restaurant in the United States

Chinese fried rice is common in American Chinese cuisine, especially in the form sold as fast food. The most common form of American Chinese fried rice consists of some mixture of eggs, scallions, and vegetables, with chopped meat added at the customer's discretion, and usually flavored with soy sauce instead of table salt (more typical for Chinese-style fried rice). Sometimes a chop suey-fried rice combo is offered in Chinese restaurants in the United States.

The dish is also ubiquitous in Chinese restaurants in the United Kingdom (both sit-in and takeaway), and is common in the West African nations of Nigeria, Ghana and Togo, both in restaurants and as street food.

In Korea, Korean Chinese-style fried rice is a separate genre of fried rice that differs from Korean-style fried rice dishes.

McDonald's serves McChao, a Chinese fried rice dish named after chǎofàn, which means "fried rice" in Chinese.

== Bacillus cereus poisoning ==
Bacillus cereus poisoning is called "Chinese fried rice syndrome" due to its historical tie with fried rice dishes.

== Gallery ==
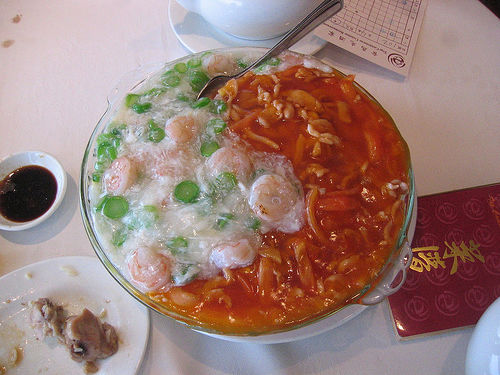
Yin yang fried rice (鴛鴦炒飯) in Canada

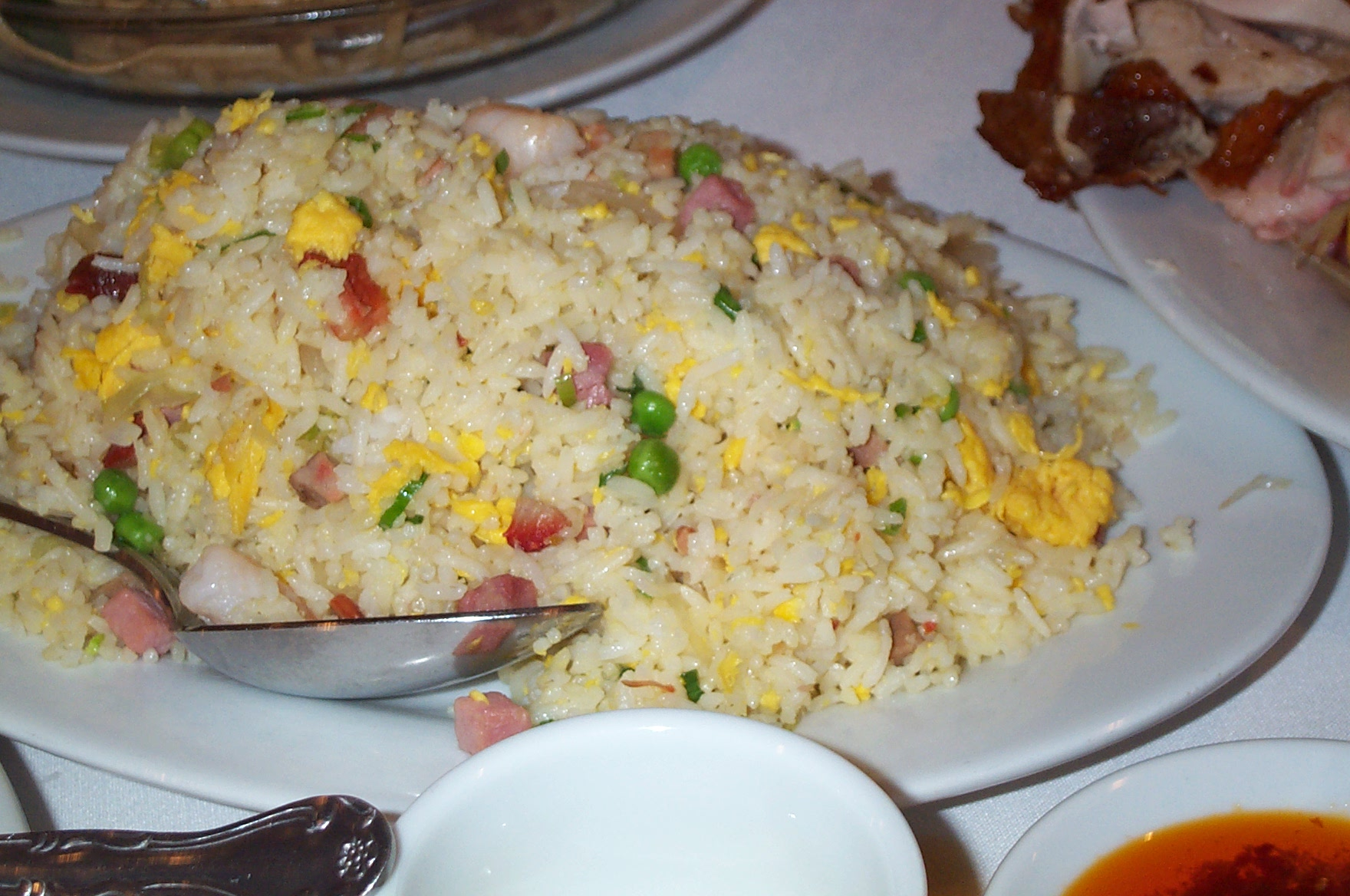
Yangzhou fried rice (扬州炒饭) in the United States

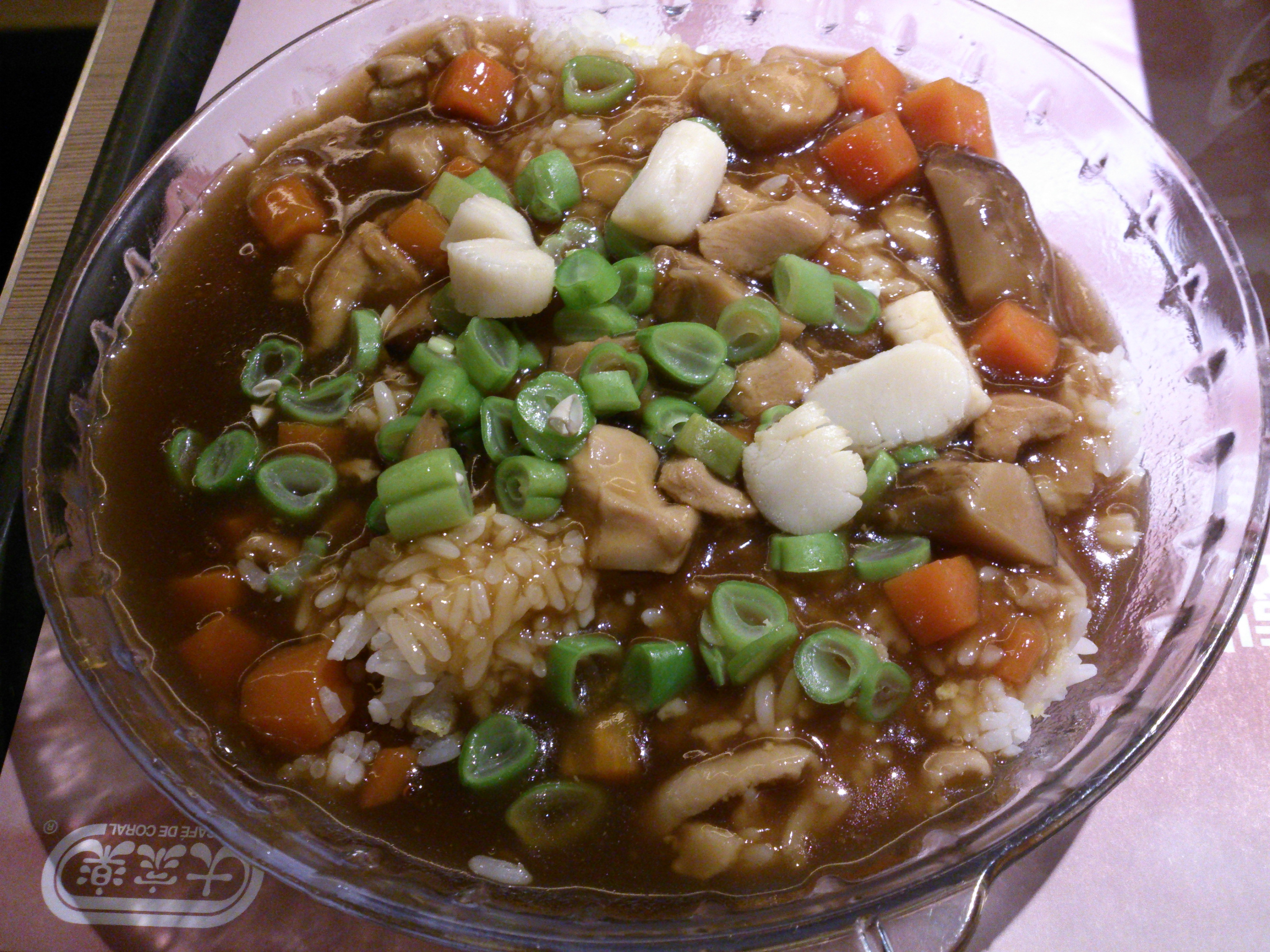
Hokkien fried rice (福建炒飯) is a dish from Hong Kong

== See also ==
- List of fried rice dishes
