= American fried rice =

Fried rice meal served with American style foods

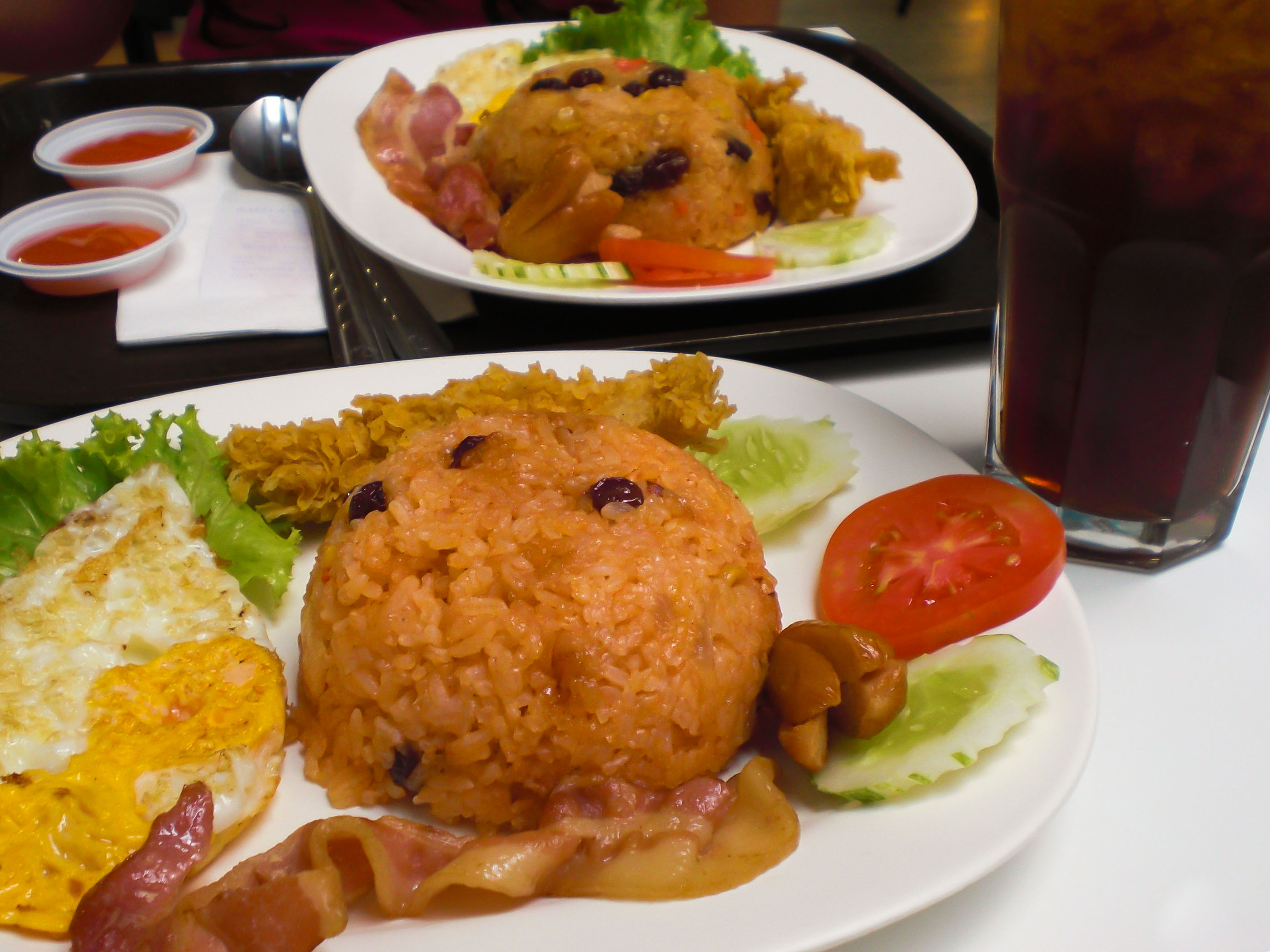
- American fried rice
- Alternative names: ข้าวผัดอเมริกัน
- Type: Thai fried rice
- Course: Rice dish
- Place of origin: Thailand
- Associated cuisine: Thailand, Vietnam, Malaysia
- Serving temperature: Hot
- Main ingredients: Ketchup-fried rice, processed meat, sunny egg, raisins

American fried rice (Thai: ข้าวผัดอเมริกัน, RTGS: khao phat amerikan, pronounced [kʰâ(ː)w pʰàt ʔāmēːrīkān]) is a Thai fried rice dish with "American" side ingredients like fried chicken, ham, sausages, raisins, and ketchup. Other ingredients like pineapples and croutons are optional.

== History ==
The origin of American fried rice has a number of tales, anecdotes, urban legend, and related stories. Most of those stories are related to either American troops or their culture. Currently, there are three major tales and hypotheses about the origins of American fried rice:

=== Sureepan Maneewat created the dish ===
Khun Ying Sureepan Maneewat, the wife of Chao Krung newspaper's pioneer editor Vilas Maneewat, claimed to the Sakul Thai magazine that she created American fried rice circa 1950. She was a manager of Ratchathani Restaurant, the restaurant of Don Mueang Airport which cooked meals for several airlines. One day, an airline cancelled a flight, leaving her loads of prepared American breakfast; sunny eggs, sausages and hams. Sureepan decided to cook the American breakfast ingredients with the leftover fried rice, hence the name "American fried rice". The proteins varied day-to-day, depending on which "American breakfast" was left on the day, from sausages and hams to baked chicken.

=== "Go Jek" created the dish ===
Some believe that the American fried rice was created by a Thai-Chinese chef, "Go Jek", during the Vietnam War era to serve to United States Marine Corps and United States Air Force personnel stationed in Korat and Udon Thani, Thailand, it was not generally found in Thai restaurants outside Thailand, but with the proliferation of Thai restaurants in the United States, American fried rice is now appearing on Thai restaurant menus there.

=== The dish was derived from Mexican rice or Cajun rice ===
This hypothesis is based on deconstructing the composition of the dish, combined with tracing the cooking techniques used in the American fried rice in order to trace the cooking lineage of this dish in the United States (Chuenwattana 2020).

All of the cooking techniques and ingredients using in the American Fried Rice are similar to the dish called "Mexican rice" in Southern United States or Cajun's dirty rice in Louisiana, Mexican rice cooked or fried rice grains with tomatoes or ketchup. Mexican rice often served with variety of dishes (e.g. fried eggs, fried chicken, crispy bacon).

Mexican rice recipe for the first time appeared on a daily menu recipe in the Newark Evening Star and Newark Advertiser on June 2nd, 1910. According to this recipe, Mexican rice is accompanied with frankfurter. However, Mexican rice was paired with several other dishes after that. Mexican rice or Cajun rice is presumed to be in Thailand via the American soldiers who stationed here during the Cold War. Both Mexican rice or Cajun rice would eventually become the ancestor of the American fried rice in Thailand.

== Muslim version (Southern Thailand and Malaysia) ==
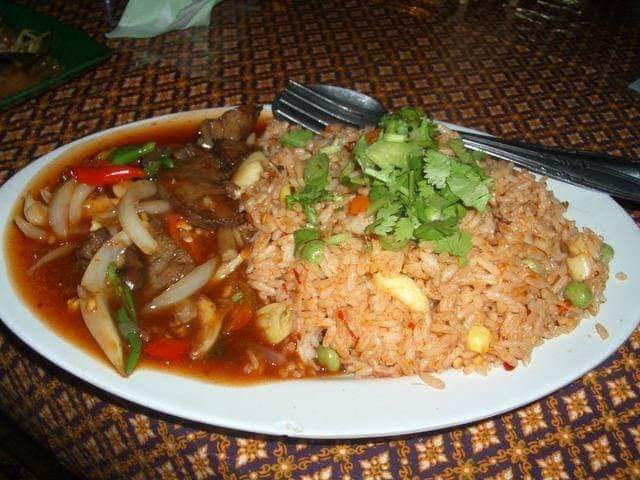
Nasi goreng Amerika at Kelantan, Malaysia

American fried rice in Malaysia and Southern Thailand have different versions that have been modified from the original version. Usually it replaces the side dish of "bacon" or "ham" with Thai red meat (Malay: daging masak merah ala Thai). This change was made because Thai Malays and Malaysian Malays practice Islam. This dish is sometimes confused with the Malaysian dish called nasi goreng USA, in which the initialism “USA” stands for shrimp (udang), squid (sotong) and chicken (ayam).

== See also ==
- American cuisine
- Chinese fried rice
- Fried rice
- Thai fried rice
