= Thai fried rice =

Fried rice variety

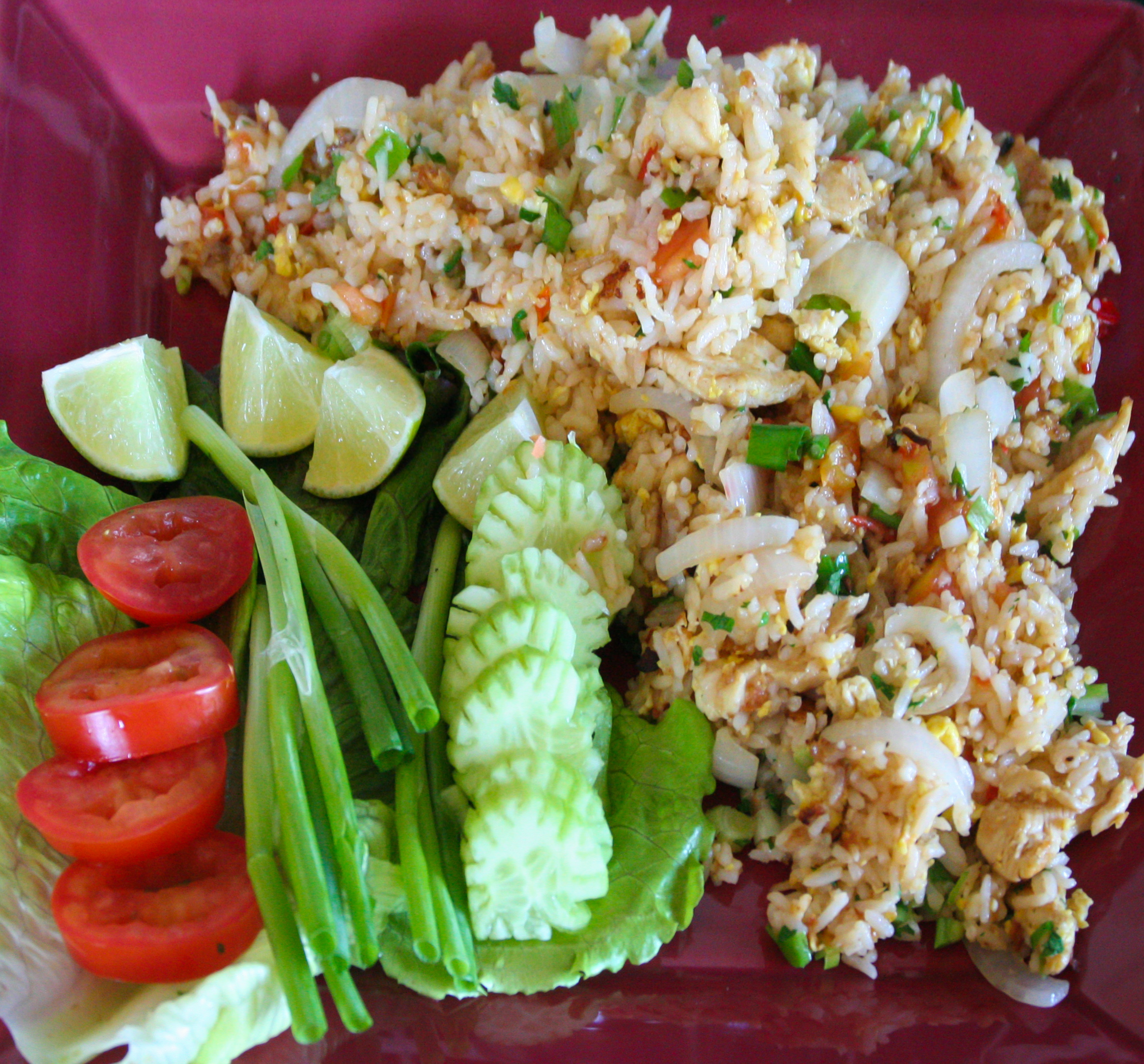
- Thai fried rice, with common garnishes of cucumber, lime (for squeezing on top), tomato, and green onion served on a bed of lettuce.
- Alternative names: khao phat
- Type: Rice dish
- Course: Main course
- Place of origin: Central Thailand
- Associated cuisine: Thailand

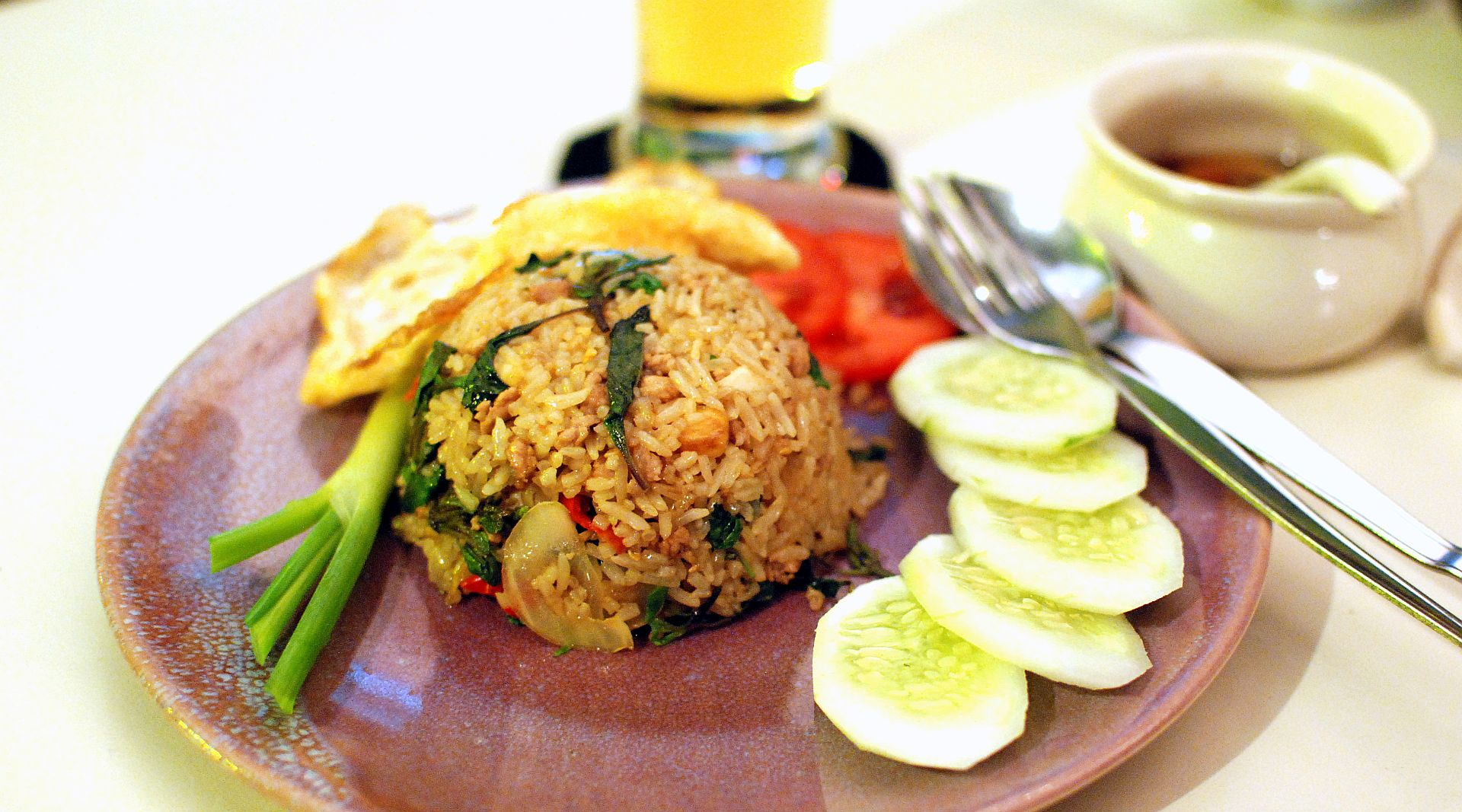
Khao phat kaphrao mu (rice fried with holy basil and sliced pork).

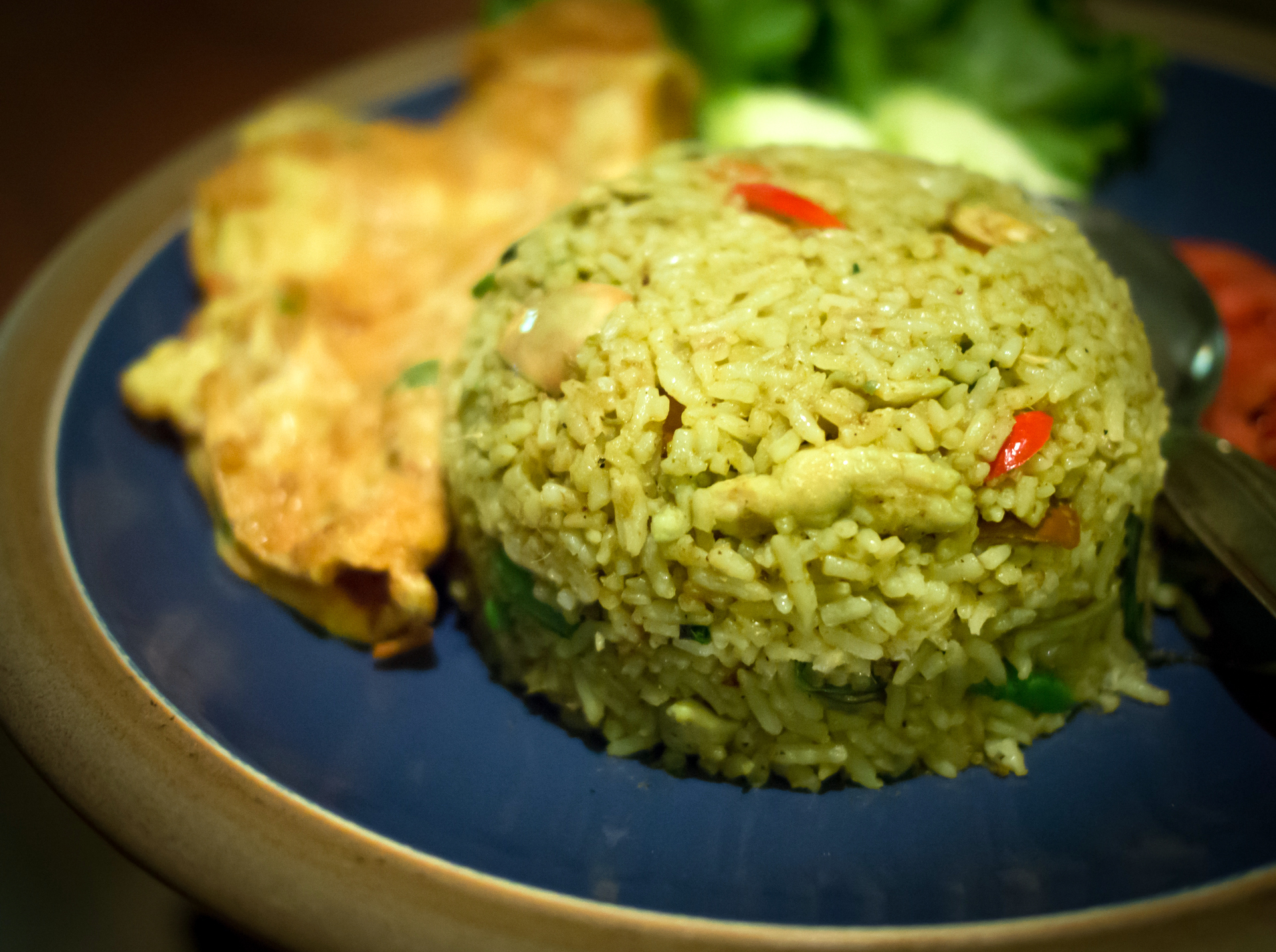
Khao phat kaeng khiao wan

Thai fried rice (Thai: ข้าวผัด, RTGS: khao phat, pronounced [kʰâ(ː)w pʰàt]) is a variety of fried rice typical of central Thai cuisine. In Thai, khao means "rice" and phat means "of or relating to being stir-fried."

This dish normally contains meat (chicken, shrimp, and crab are all common), egg, onions, garlic and sometimes tomatoes. The seasonings, which may include soy sauce, sugar, salt, possibly some chili sauce, and the ubiquitous nam pla (Thai fish sauce), are stir-fried together with the other ingredients. The dish is then plated and served with accompaniments like cucumber slices, tomato slices, lime and sprigs of green onion and coriander, and phrik nampla, a spicy sauce made of sliced Thai chilies, chopped garlic cloves, fish sauce, lime juice and sugar. It differs from Chinese fried rice in that it is prepared with Thai jasmine rice instead of regular long-grain rice.

== Variants ==
Thai fried rice has many variants denoted by main ingredient or region. Examples include:

- Khao phat mu (ข้าวผัดหมู) – fried rice with pork
- Khao phat kai (ข้าวผัดไก่) – fried rice with chicken
- Khao phat thale (ข้าวผัดทะเล) – fried rice with seafood
- Khao phat kung (ข้าวผัดกุ้ง) – fried rice with shrimp
- Khao phat pu (ข้าวผัดปู) – fried rice with crab meat
- Khao phat pla krapong (ข้าวผัดปลากระป๋อง) – fried rice with canned fish (usually sardines or mackerel in tomato sauce)
- Khao phat kak mu (ข้าวผัดกากหมู) – fried rice with pork cracklings
- Khao phat naem (ข้าวผัดแหนม) – fried rice with naem, a type of fermented pork sausage
- Khao phat bekhon (ข้าวผัดเบคอน) – fried rice with bacon
- Khao phat khai (ข้าวผัดไข่) – fried rice with egg
- Khao phat kaphrao (ข้าวผัดกะเพรา) – fried rice with basil
- Khao phat namliap (ข้าวผัดหนำเลี้ยบ) – fried rice with Chinese olives
- Khao phat sapparot (ข้าวผัดสับปะรด) – fried rice with pineapple, or a more elaborate version known as khao op sapparot (ข้าวอบสับปะรด), served inside a hollowed-out pineapple and garnished with raisins and cashew nuts
- Khao phat che (ข้าวผัดเจ) – vegetarian fried rice
- khao phat tom yam (ข้าวผัดต้มยำ) – a type of fried rice that is adapted from tom yum soup and fried rice
- Khao phat kaeng khiao wan (ข้าวผัดแกงเขียวหวาน) – fried rice mixed with green curry paste
- Khao phat nam phrik long ruea (ข้าวผัดน้ำพริกลงเรือ) – fried rice mixed with nam phrik long ruea, a type of chili paste
- Khao phat rotfai (ข้าวผัดรถไฟ: "train fried rice") – fried rice mixed with either dark soy sauce or red fermented bean curd. It was sold at various stations along the southern railway line, hence the name
- Khao phat amerikan (ข้าวผัดอเมริกัน: "American fried rice") uses hot dogs, fried chicken, and eggs as side dishes or mixed into fried rice with ketchup added. It was served to U.S. soldiers in Thailand during the Vietnam War, but now has become common in Thailand.
- Khao khluk kapi (ข้าวคลุกกะปิ) – fried rice mixed with shrimp paste

== See also ==
- American fried rice
- Fried rice
- List of fried rice dishes
