= Kimchi fried rice =

Korean dish

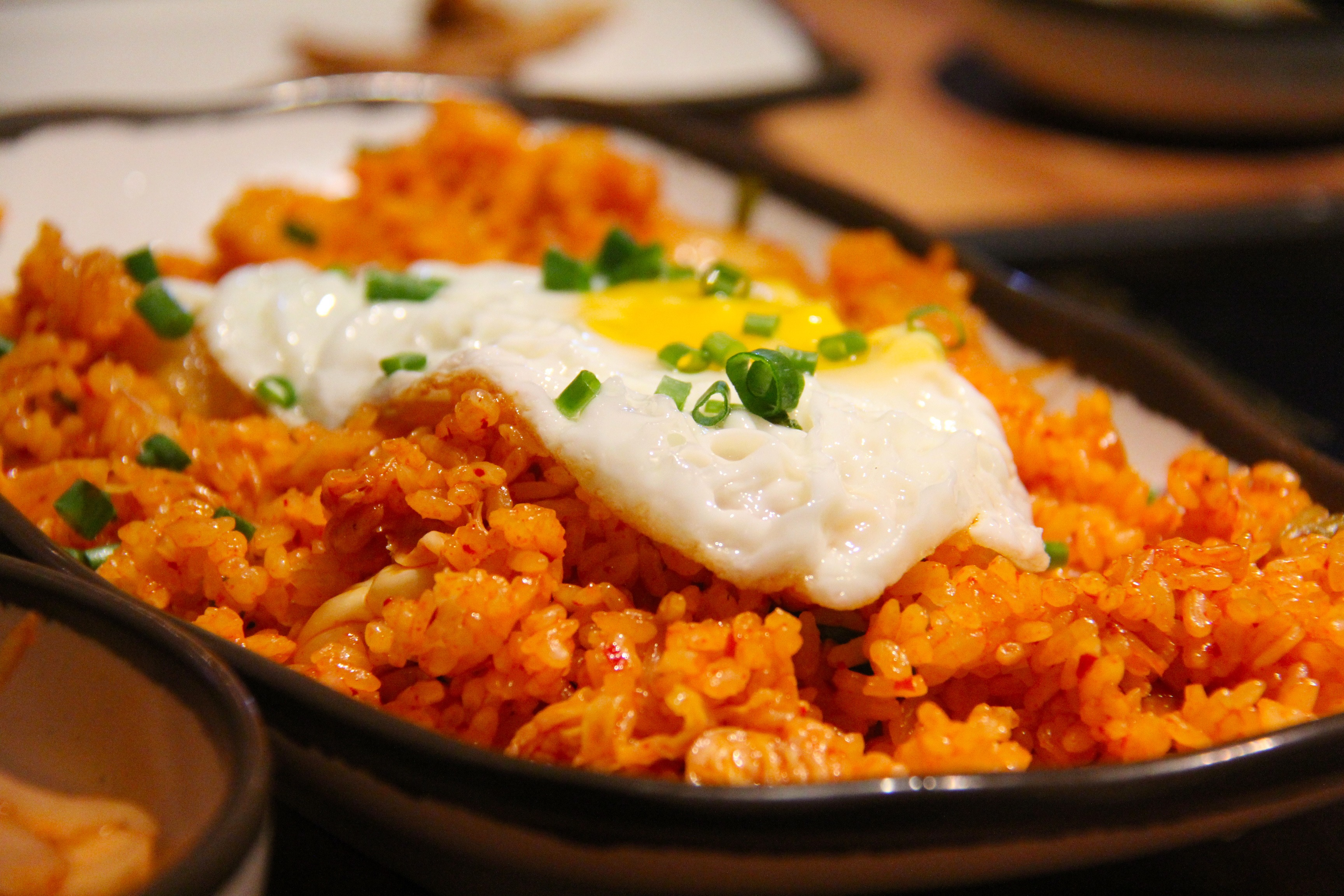
- Alternative names: Kimchi-bokkeum-bap
- Type: Bokkeum-bap
- Place of origin: Korea

Korean name
- Hangul: 김치볶음밥
- RR: gimchibokkeumbap
- MR: kimch'ibokkŭmbap
- IPA: [kim.tɕʰi.bo.k͈ɯm.bap̚]

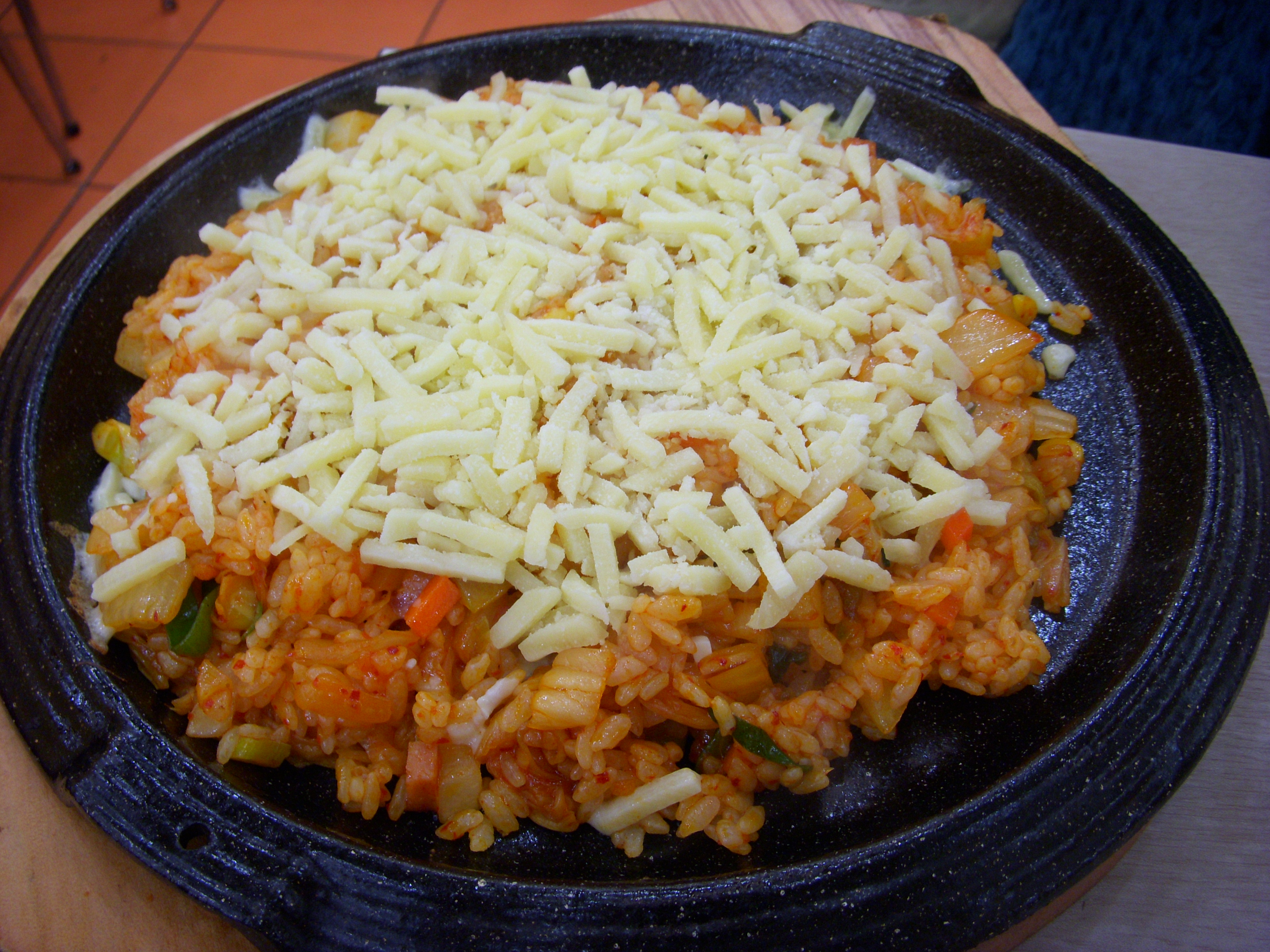
Kimchi fried rice with mozzarella cheese

Kimchi fried rice or kimchi-bokkeum-bap (Korean: 김치볶음밥) is a variety of bokkeum-bap ("fried rice"), a popular dish in South Korea. Kimchi fried rice is made primarily with kimchi and rice, along with other available ingredients such as diced vegetables or meats like Spam.

== Ingredients ==
Leftover chilled rice and over-ripened kimchi are usually preferred in preparing kimchi fried rice Over-ripened kimchi can also be used for cooking kimchi jjigae as they can produce a richer flavor and texture as opposed to freshly-made kimchi and rice. In preliminary preparation, surplus "kimchiso" (김치소), kimchi filling, mostly shredded radish, green onions and jeotgal (fermented and salted seafood), are taken out from the kimchi. The kimchi is then squeezed to discard its brine. Without completing the process, the resultant dish can be mushy in texture.

Along with kimchi and rice, kimchi fried rice can contain many kinds of ingredients. Pork or spam are the most common; however, beef, chicken, bacon, ham, canned tuna, or shrimp can be used. Instead of meat, mushrooms can be used as a replacement, in which case the ingredient's name may be prefixed to the dish's name such as "beoseot-kimchi-bokkeum-bap" (버섯 김치볶음밥; lit. 'mushroom kimchi fried rice'). Meat ingredients are chopped into the dish together with vegetables such as onion, carrot or zucchini. However, ingredients depend on personal preference and occasion. A small amount of minced garlic and sliced green pepper can be used as seasoning. These ingredients are fried in a pan with a little vegetable or sesame oil.

After the cooked dish is put on a plate or in a bowl, a fried egg is sometimes served on top. Thinly shredded gim, chopped scallions, and sesame seeds are often spread over it to enhance the flavor and to garnish.

== Popularity ==
Since kimchi fried rice is cheap and easy to make quickly, it is favored by students living alone who cannot afford expensive meals. Kimchi fried rice is also a popular item for lunch at a bunsikjeom ("bunsik place"). As the dish is hot and spicy, it is typically served with danmuji and a small bowl of any kind of mild and warm soup such as miyeok-guk ("miyeok soup"), or kongnamul-guk ("soybean sprout soup"). During summer, cool dongchimi (white, watery kimchi made of radish) can also be accompanied with the dish.

The popularity of kimchi fried rice is also reflected in South Korean pop culture. Byun Jin-sub, a popular male singer in the late 1980s, sang a song titled "Wishes" (희망사항) in which he stated that the singer's ideal girlfriend would be one who cooks good kimchi fried rice. Taeyang says in his 2010 song "I Need A Girl" that his ideal girlfriend will eat the kimchi fried rice that he cooks.

== See also ==
- Korean cuisine
- List of fried rice dishes
