= Spider roll =

Sushi roll

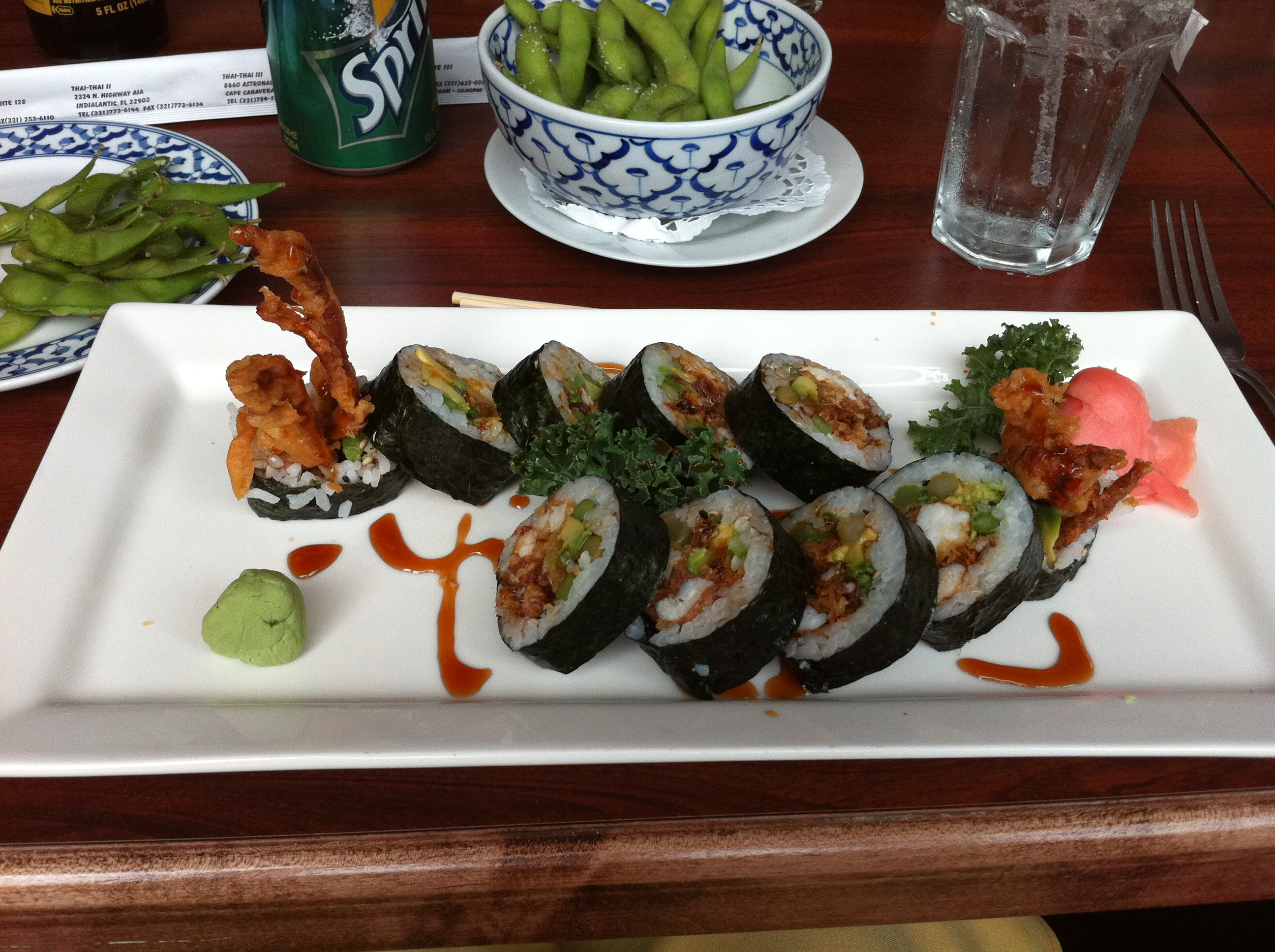
A spider roll

A spider roll is a type of makizushi sushi that includes breaded or battered soft-shell crab and other ingredients such as cucumber, avocado, daikon sprouts or lettuce, and spicy mayonnaise, rolled inside nori and sushi rice.

== Etymology ==
The dish's name is derived from the legs of the crab which stick out from the end of the roll, which looks somewhat like a spider. The dish's name is typically used in North America, and may be rare in other areas of the world.
