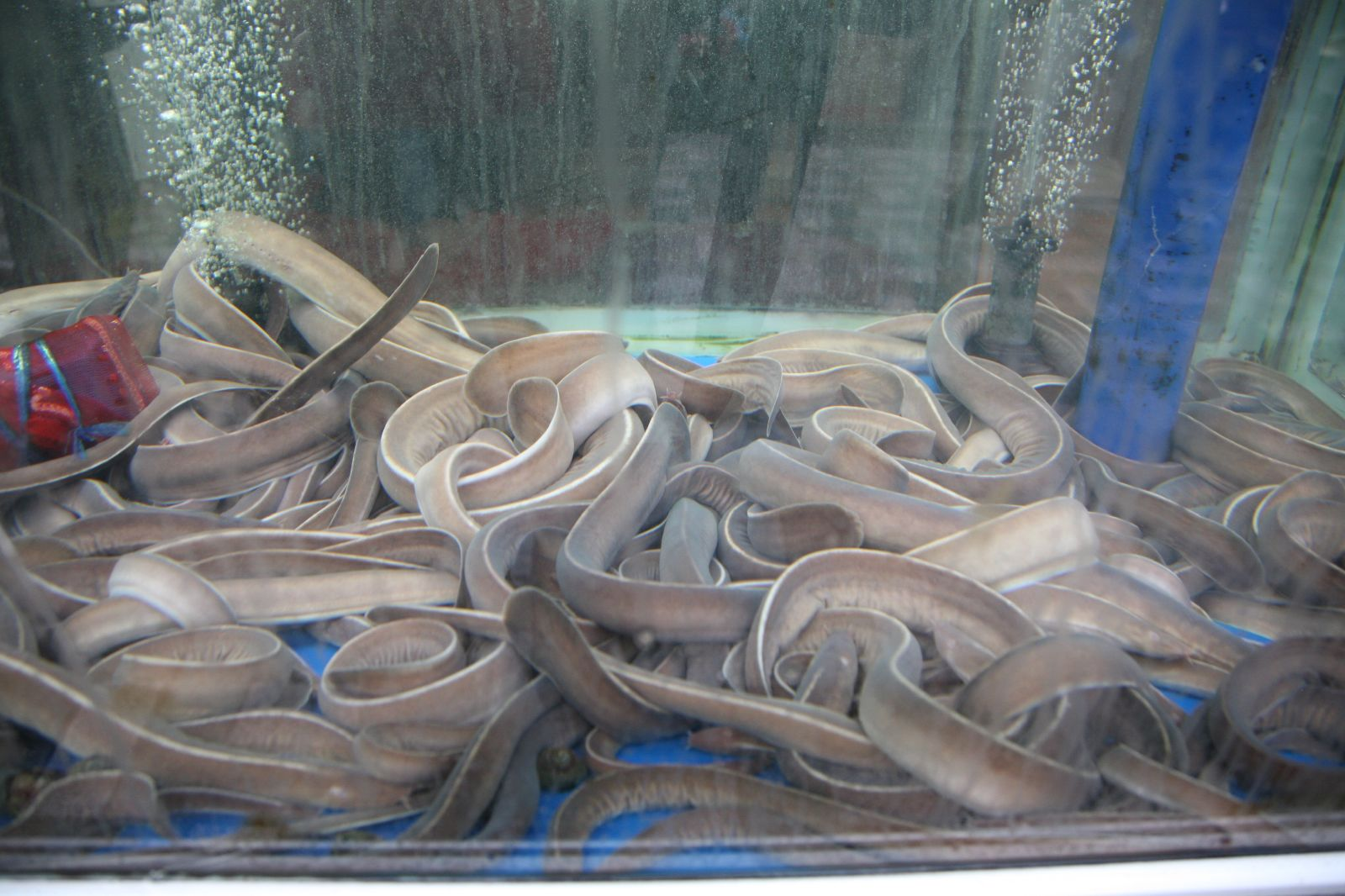
- Inshore hagfish at the market in Busan

Conservation status
- Near Threatened (IUCN 3.1)

Scientific classification
- Kingdom: Animalia
- Phylum: Chordata
- Infraphylum: Agnatha
- Class: Myxini
- Order: Myxiniformes
- Family: Myxinidae
- Genus: Eptatretus
- Species: E. burgeri

Binomial name
- Eptatretus burgeri (Girard, 1855)

Synonyms
- Bdellostoma burgeri Girard 1855; Heptatretus burgeri (Girard 1855); Homea burgeri (Girard 1855); Heptatrema cirrhatum (sic) Temminck & Schlegel 1850; Heptatretus cirrhatus (Temminck & Schlegel 1850)

= Inshore hagfish =

Species of jawless fish

The inshore hagfish (Eptatretus burgeri) is a hagfish found in the Northwest Pacific, from the Sea of Japan and across eastern Japan to Taiwan. It has six pairs of gill pouches and gill apertures, a seventh gill aperture is closely adjacent to but separate from the pharyngocutaneous duct. These hagfish are found in the sublittoral zone. They live usually buried in the bottom mud and migrate into deeper water to spawn. The inshore hagfish is the only member of the Myxinidae family having a seasonal reproductive cycle.

Generally very little is known about hagfish reproduction and embryos are difficult to obtain for study, although laboratory breeding of Eptatretus burgeri has succeeded.

The hide of this hagfish is processed into "eel skin" in Korea and exported worldwide.

== As food ==
In most countries hagfish are usually not eaten, but this particular species is valued as food in the Korean Peninsula and among the Koreans in Japan. It is also enjoyed by Japanese as a local delicacy in some regions, particularly Nagasaki and Niigata Prefectures. It is known as bùshì nián mángmán (布氏黏盲鰻) and púshì nián mángmán (蒲氏黏盲鰻) among other names in Mandarin Chinese, kkomjangeo (꼼장어) or meokjangeo (먹장어) in Korean, and nuta-unagi (ヌタウナギ) in Japanese.

As with all hagfish, the inshore hagfish produces slime when agitated. This is obtained by placing a live inshore hagfish into a container and knocking the container with a stick.

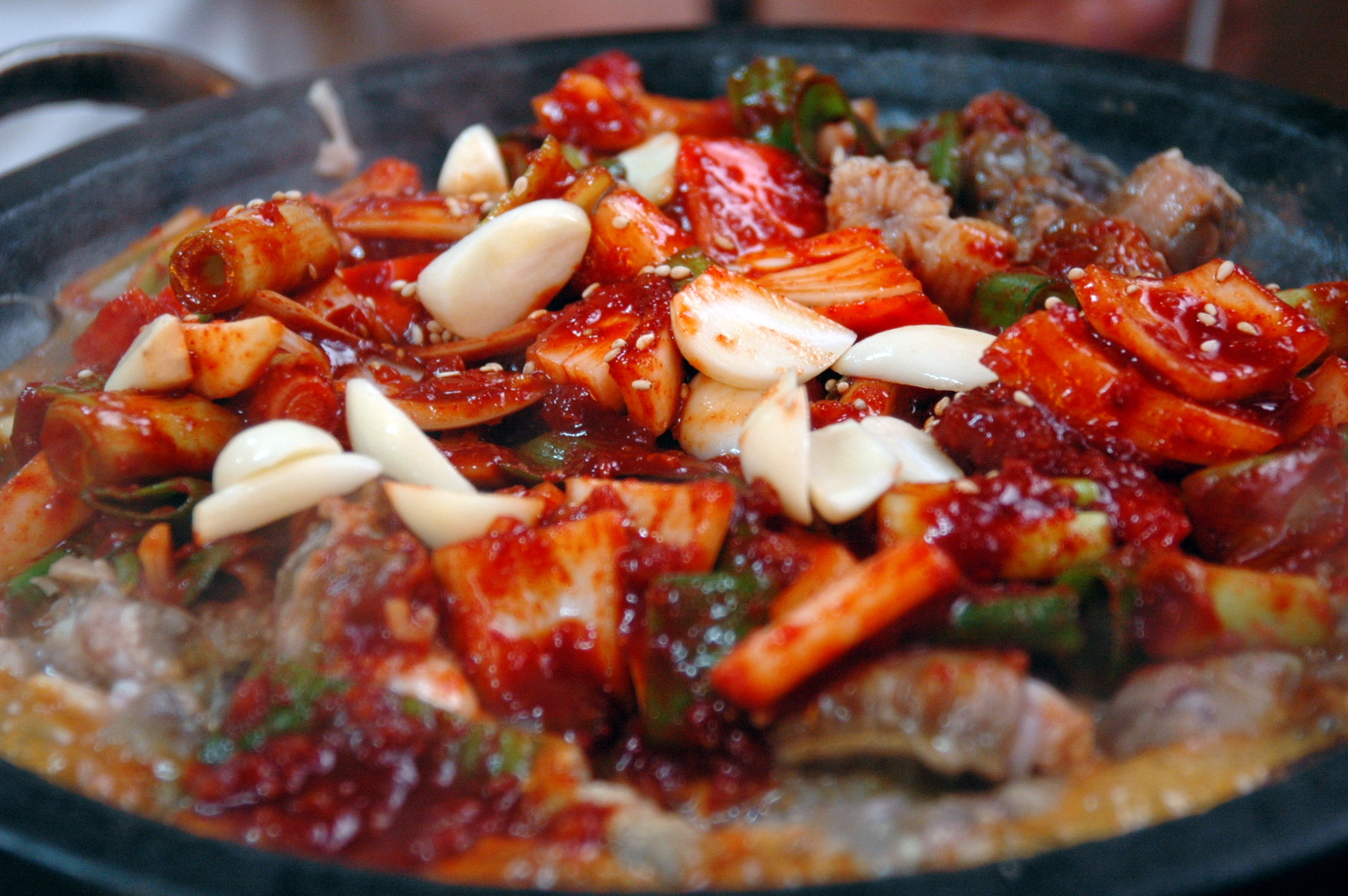
Kkomjangeo bokkeum (꼼장어 볶음), Korean stir-fried fish dish made with inshore hagfish.

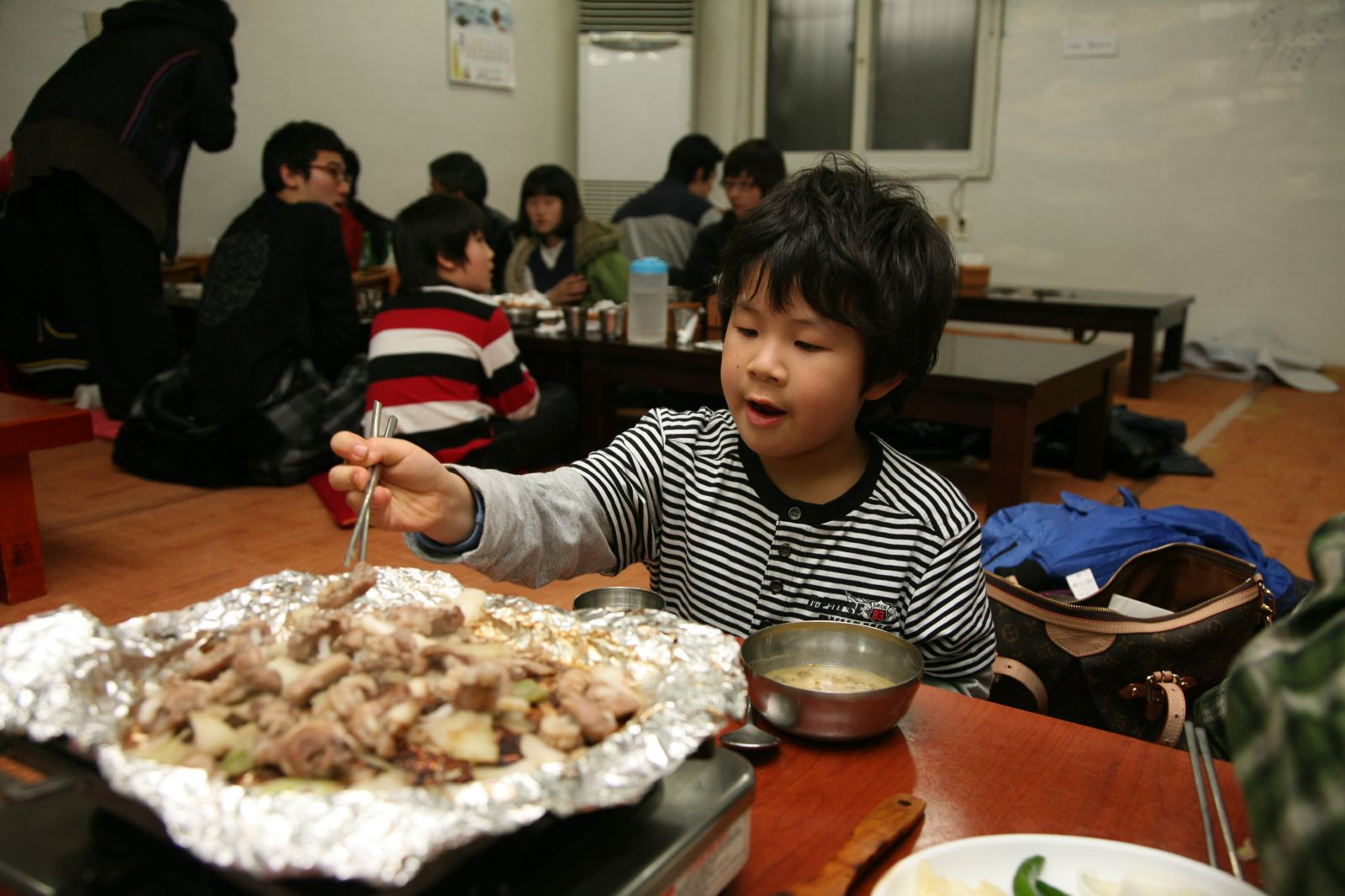
Eating inshore hagfish at a market in Busan, South Korea.
