= Dynamite roll =

Type of Western-style sushi

A dynamite roll is a Makizushi type of Western-style sushi. It usually contains a piece of shrimp tempura, avocado, and cucumber. It can also include proteins like salmon, crab, tuna, hamachi/yellowtail, vegetables like radish sprouts or oshinko, and garnishes like masago/tobiko (fish roe). It is combined with a sauce consisting of kewpie, Worcestershire, soy sauce, Sriracha or wasabi, and sometimes garlic.

Dynamite rolls are made with the rice on the outside of the nori instead of on the inside.
