= Hokkien fried rice =

Cantonese-style fried rice dish

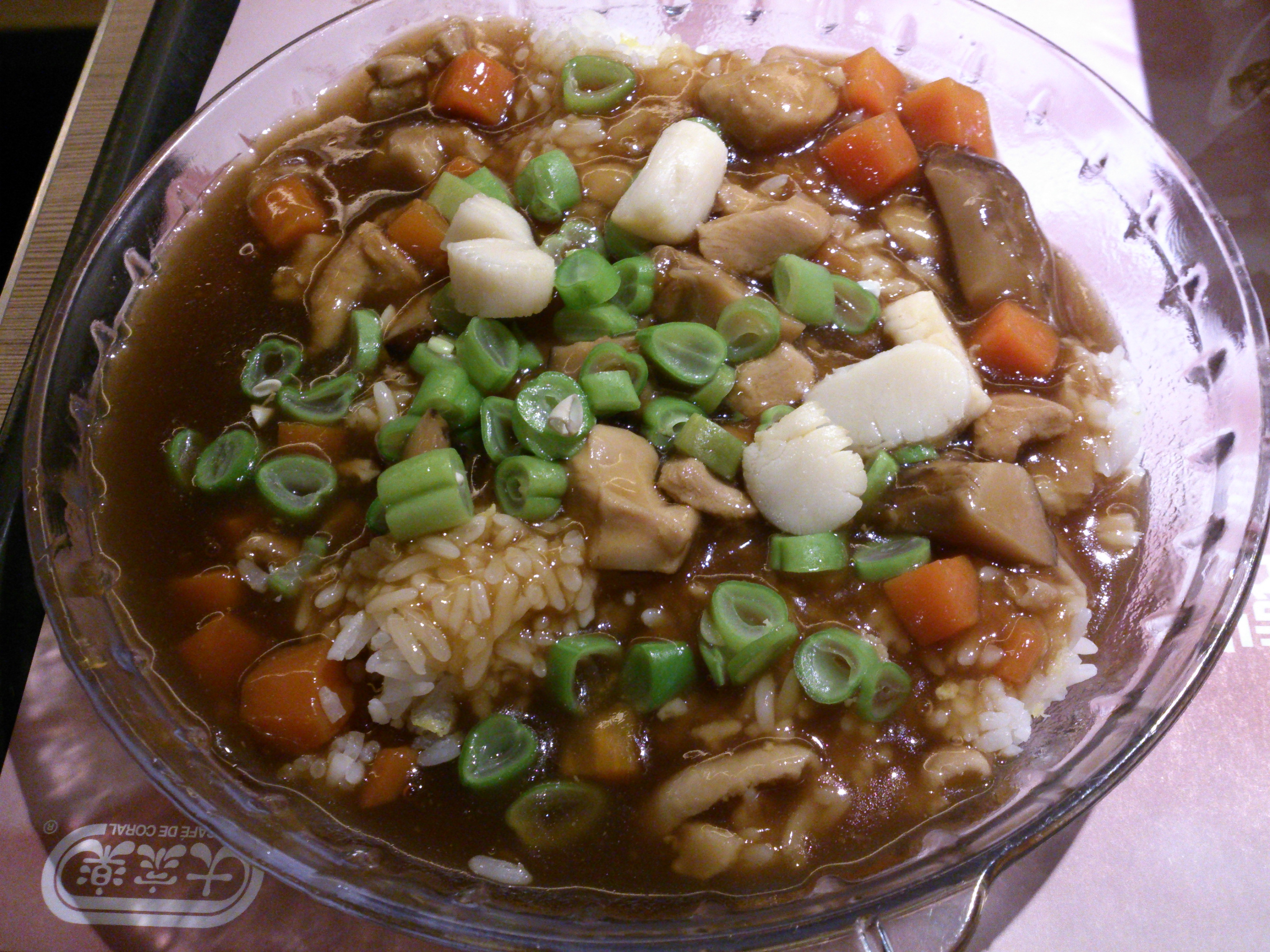
Hokkien fried rice in Hong Kong fast-food restaurant

Hokkien fried rice (Jyutping: fuk1 gin3 caau2 faan6; also known as Fujian fried rice) is a well-known Cantonese-style wok fried rice dish served in many Chinese restaurants in Hong Kong. This dish did not originate in Fujian. It consists of a saucy stir-fried topping poured over ordinary egg fried rice. The topping can include mushrooms, meat, vegetables, and other ingredients. These ingredients are stir-fried, mixed with water and starch, then seasoned with broth, soy sauce, and oyster sauce.

== See also ==
- Fried rice
- Gaifan
- List of fried rice dishes
