= Yin yang fried rice =

Rice dish from Hong Kong

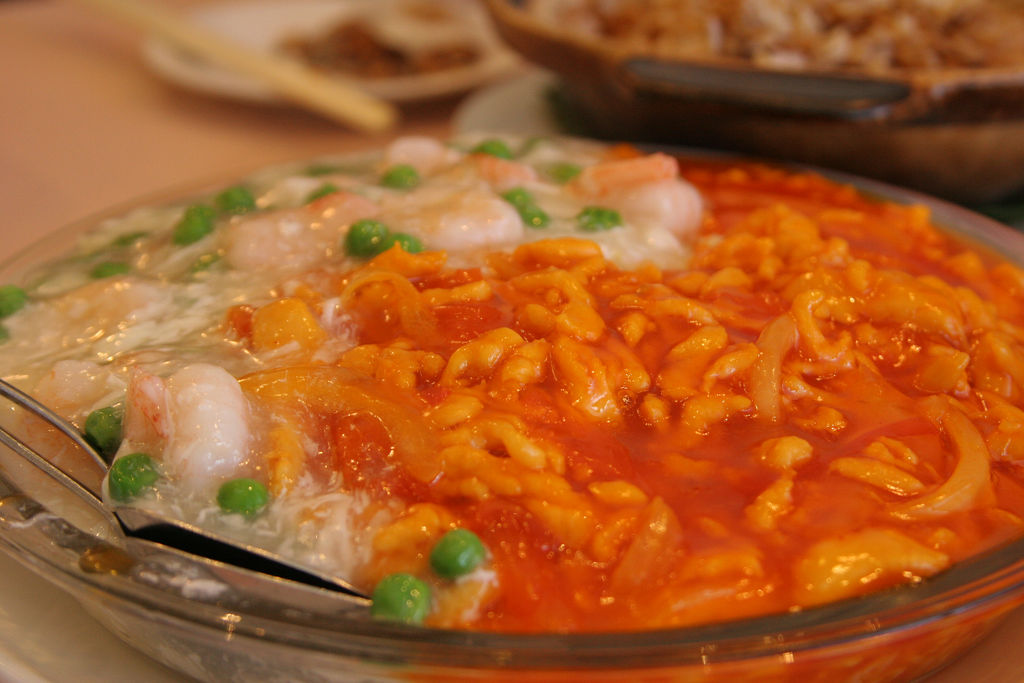
Yin yang fried rice

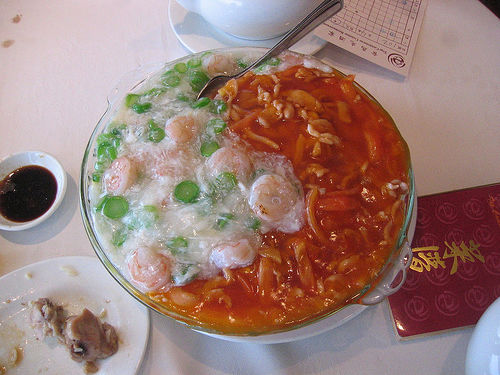
Yin yang fried rice in Chinese restaurant

Yin yang fried rice (also transliterated as yuenyeung fried rice or yuanyang fried rice; Chinese: 鴛鴦炒飯; pinyin: yuānyāng chǎofàn; Jyutping: jyun1 joeng1 caau2 faan6) is a rice dish from Hong Kong, consisting of a plate of rice with béchamel sauce and tomato sauce.

The name "Yin yang" refers to mandarin ducks — a symbol of conjugal love in Chinese culture — as the birds usually appear in pairs and are highly sexually dimorphic in their appearance. The dish is named after this same connotation of a compatible "pair" of two dissimilar items: the béchamel and tomato sauces. Due to the romantic association, this dish is often served in Hong Kong wedding dinners.

== See also ==
- List of rice dishes
- Yuenyeung (drink)
