= Yangzhou fried rice =

Chinese-style dish

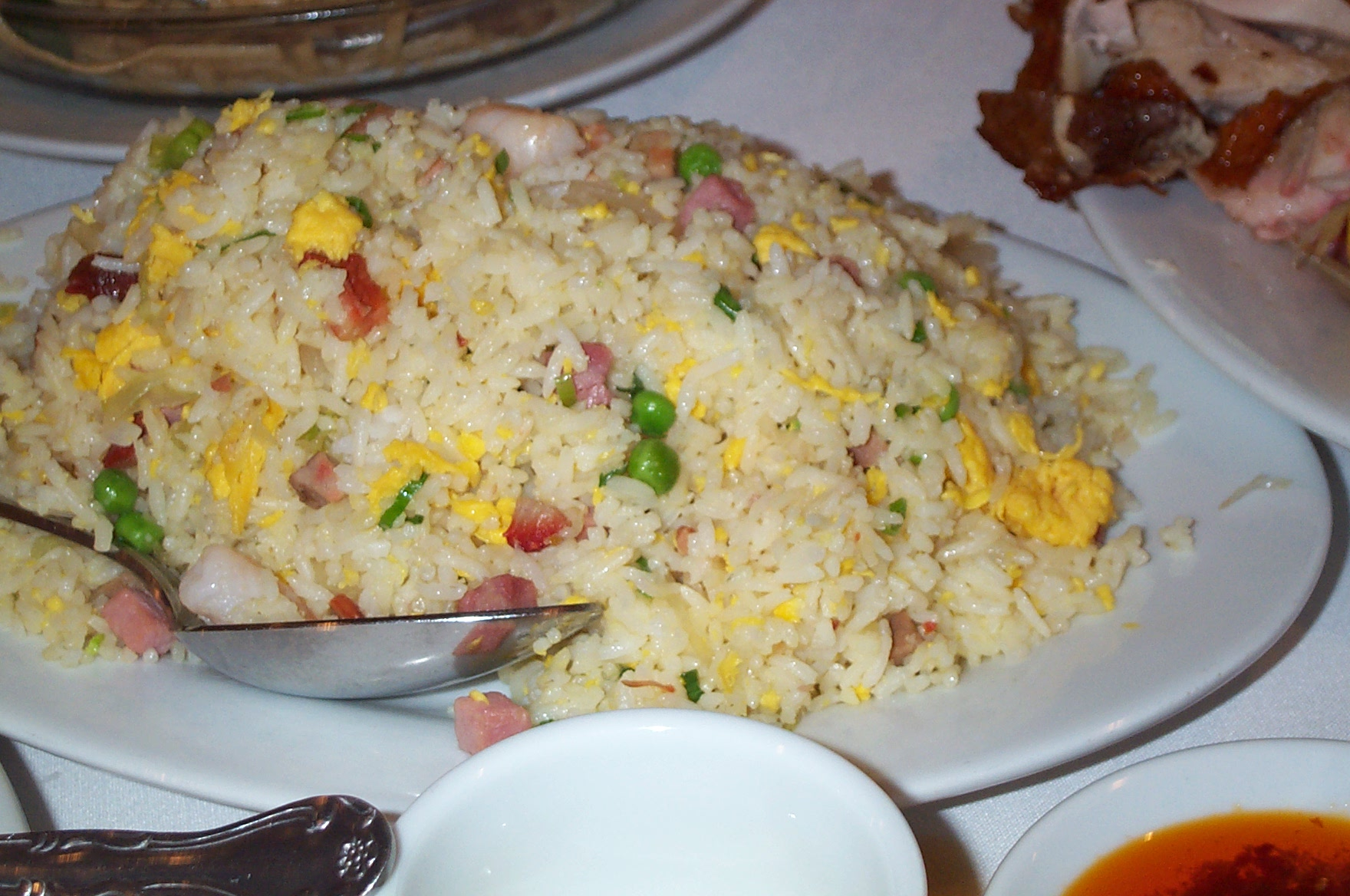
- Alternative names: Yeung Chow fried rice; Yang Chow fried rice; house fried rice
- Course: Entree
- Place of origin: Yangzhou, China
- Created by: Yi Bingshou (Qing dynasty)
- Main ingredients: cooked rice; cha shao/char siu pork; cooked shrimp; scallions, chopped; egg yolks; peas; carrots
- Variations: Fried rice

Yangzhou fried rice

Chinese name
- Traditional Chinese: 揚州炒飯
- Simplified Chinese: 扬州炒饭
- Literal meaning: Yangzhou fried rice
Transcriptions
Standard Mandarin
- Hanyu Pinyin: Yángzhōu chǎofàn
- Bopomofo: ㄧㄤˊ ㄓㄡ ㄔㄠˇ ㄈㄢˋ
- Wade–Giles: Yang^{2}-chou^{1} chʻao^{3}-fan^{4}
- Tongyong Pinyin: Yángjhou chǎo-fàn
- IPA: [jǎŋ.ʈʂóʊ ʈʂʰàʊ.fân]
Yue: Cantonese
- Yale Romanization: Yèuhngjāu cháaufaahn
- Jyutping: joeng4 zau1 caau2 faan6
Southern Min
- Hokkien POJ: Iông-chiu chhá-pn̄g

Vietnamese name
- Vietnamese: cơm chiên Dương Châu

Yangzhou fried rice, also known by several other spellings and names, is a popular Chinese wok-fried rice dish. There are many varieties but it most properly describes egg fried rice with mixed vegetables and two forms of protein, typically pork and shrimp with scallions.

== Names ==
Yangzhou fried rice is a calque of the Chinese name written 揚州炒飯 in traditional characters or 扬州炒饭 in simplified ones, pronounced Yángzhōu chǎofàn in Mandarin or joeng4 zau1 caau2 faan6 in Cantonese. Although it did not originate there, it is named for Yangzhou, an ancient city at the intersection of the Yangtze River and the Grand Canal in eastern China. "Yangzhou" is the pinyin romanization devised in the 1950s and very gradually introduced across the rest of the world. The dish is also frequently known as Yangchow fried rice from the same name's Postal Map form and as Yeung Chow fried rice from irregular romanization of its Cantonese pronunciation.

The same dish is also known in Australia and New Zealand as "special fried rice". Less often, it is known in the United States as "house fried rice".

== Ingredients ==
The difference between Yangzhou fried rice and ordinary fried rice is that Yangzhou style invariably includes a combination of proteins. Rather than using a single protein like shrimp or pork or chicken as the dominant ingredient in fried rice, Yangzhou uses a variety. Most commonly used is a combination of pork and shrimp; roasted or boiled chicken and duck are also found. Ordinarily, some of its staple items include:

- Rice
- Egg
- Diced Chinese-style roast pork (char siu)
- Shrimp
- Chopped scallions, including the green end
- Vegetables such as Chinese broccoli (gai lan), carrots, peas, corn, and bamboo shoots

The peas may be a replacement or an addition for the green onions. Some recipes include Shaoxing wine. Some western Chinese restaurants also use soy sauce to flavor the rice, and add meat such as chicken.

== History ==
Yangzhou fried rice was first popularized by the Qing official Yi Bingshou (t 伊秉綬, s 伊秉绶, Yī Bǐngshòu; 1754–1815), who had previously been the prefect of Yangzhou and is also traditionally credited for yi mein. Still, there have been attempts by people in Yangzhou to patent the dish.

In October 2015, as part of the 2,500th anniversary of the town of Yangzhou, an attempt was made in Yangzhou at beating the previous world record for fried rice set in 2014 by the Turkey culinary federation. The attempt, made by the World Association of Chinese Cuisine resulted in 4,192 kilograms (9,242 lb) of Yangzhou fried rice being produced by a team of 300 cooks. The organizers initially planned to send the end product to five companies for consumption by their staff. However, about 150 kilograms (330 lb) of it ended up as pig swill, as it had been cooked for four hours and was felt unsuitable for human consumption. As per the organizers' intents, the rest was sent to local canteens. However, due to a part of it being sent to feed animals, the world record attempt was disqualified, as a Guinness World Records spokesman said that it had become obvious that the dish was not fit for human consumption.

== See also ==
- List of Chinese dishes
- List of fried rice dishes
