= Chahan (dish) =

Japanese fried rice dish

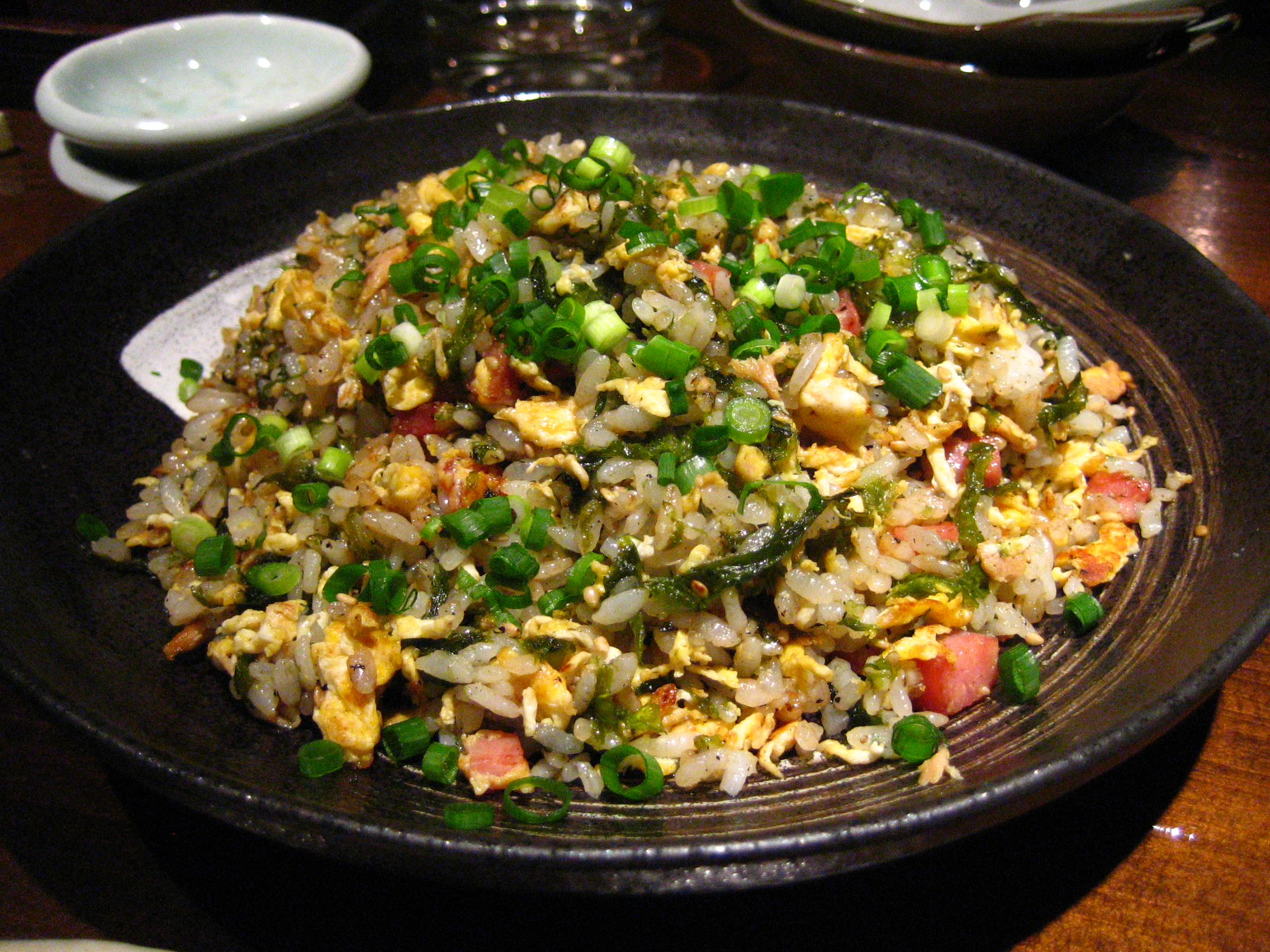
- Chahan prepared with many ingredients, at a restaurant in Naha, Okinawa, Japan
- Alternative names: チャーハン/炒飯
- Associated cuisine: Japan
- Created by: Chinese immigrants
- Invented: 1860s
- Main ingredients: Rice

Chahan (Japanese: チャーハン, 炒飯, Hepburn: chāhan), also known as yakimeshi (Japanese: 焼飯, 焼き飯), is a Japanese fried rice dish prepared with rice as a primary ingredient and many optional additional ingredients and seasonings. The dish is typically fried, and can be cooked in a wok. Chahan may have originated in the 1860s from Chinese immigrants arriving at the port of Kobe. Chahan is a staple food in homes in Japan. Some restaurants outside Japan serve the dish as a part of their fare.

== History ==
Chahan may have originated from Chinese immigrants who arrived at the port of Kobe, Japan in the 1860s. In Chinese, fried rice is called 炒飯 (Hanyu Pinyin: chǎofàn); the Japanese word chāhan is a modern borrowing of chǎofàn or a similar form.

== Preparation ==
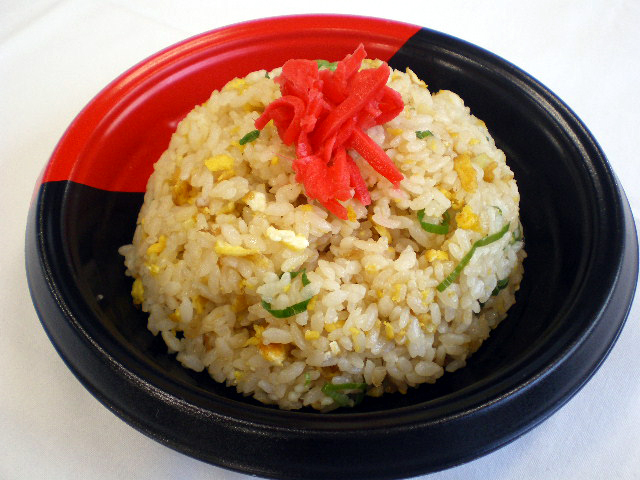
Chahan can be shaped when serving for aesthetic appeal.

Chahan is a Japanese fried rice dish typically cooked in a wok. Rice is used as a primary ingredient, and a wide range of additional ingredients can be used including scrambled egg, vegetables, onion, garlic, edible mushrooms such as shiitake, tofu, pork, as well as seafoods such as crab meat, roe, and shrimp. Oils such as canola oil, sesame oil and sunflower oil are used to fry the dish. The dish can be seasoned with soy sauce, oyster sauce, sesame oil, salt, pepper and katsuobushi, a dried and flaked tuna product. Shiso, an Asian culinary herb, may also be used to flavor chahan. Nori, a dried edible seaweed product, can be used as a garnish.

The use of a hot wok for frying and cooking chahan quickly can prevent the rice from sticking to the pan, and using warm rice also prevents pan sticking. The use of pre-cooked and refrigerated rice is also conducive toward enhancing the cooking process.

== Variations ==
Takana chahan is prepared with takanazuke (pickled takana) as a primary ingredient.

== See also ==
- Japanese cuisine
- List of fried rice dishes
- List of Japanese dishes
- Omurice – Western-influenced Japanese dish consisting of an omelette with rice
