= List of variations of nasi goreng =

Across southeast Asia

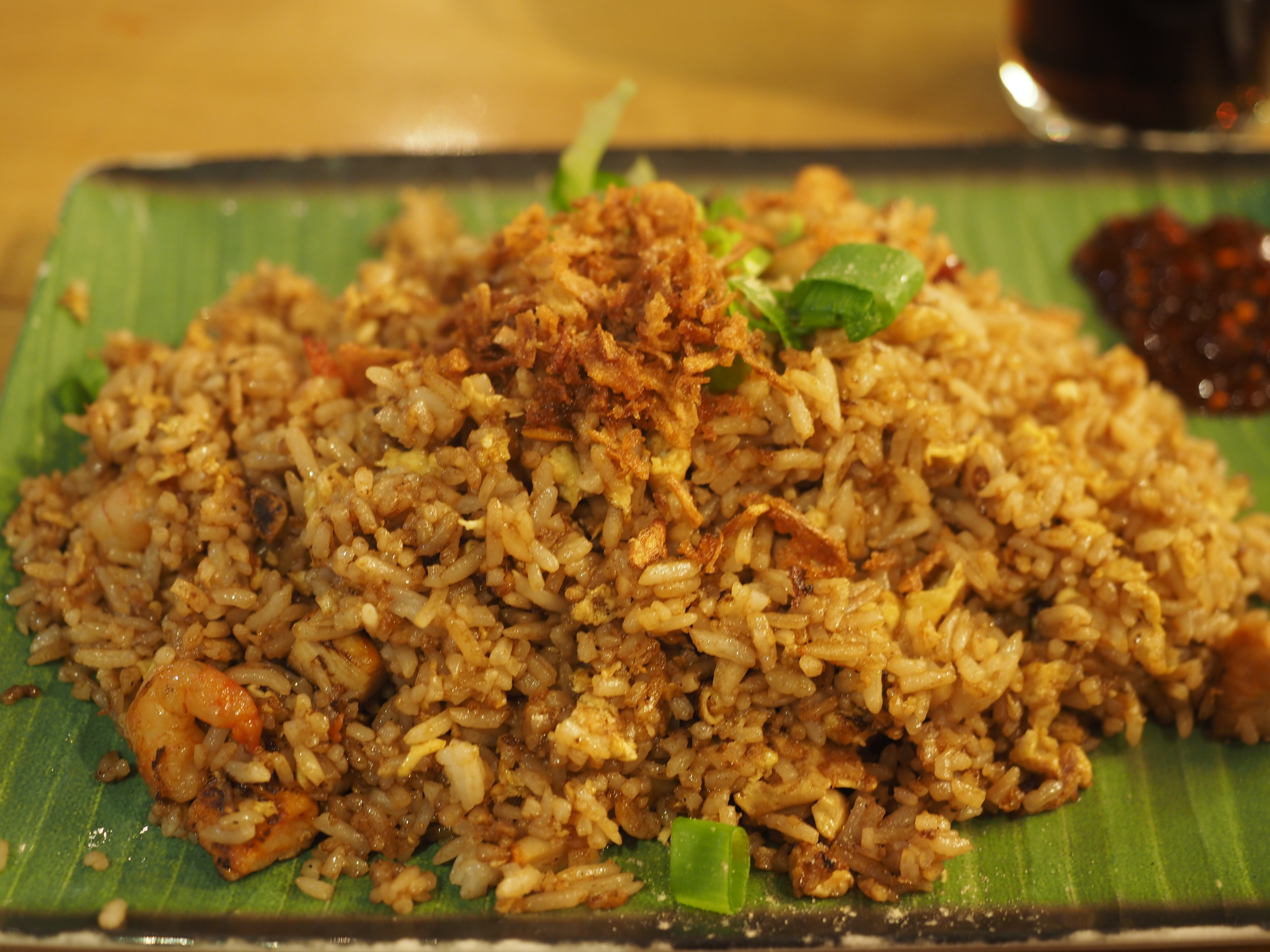
A plate of nasi goreng with chicken and prawns, served at Singapore Hot Work restaurant in Kamppi, Helsinki, Finland.

Nasi goreng (lit: Fried rice) has developed into a wide array of variations throughout Southeast Asia, reflecting local ingredients, culinary traditions and cultural influences. Originating from Chinese fried rice techniques, it was adapted over time to suit the tastes and available ingredients of Indonesia, Malaysia, Singapore, Brunei and southern Thailand. Variants differ in their primary components, including chicken, seafood, vegetables, or region-specific ingredients such as shredded cabbage, petai (stinky bean) and kluwek (black keluak fruit).

Some forms of nasi goreng are named after their geographic or cultural origins, including nasi goreng Aceh, nasi goreng Bali, nasi goreng Jawa and nasi goreng Padang. Others are identified by their cooking methods or presentation, such as nasi goreng amplop (wrapped in an omelette), nasi goreng bakar (grilled in banana leaf) and nasi goreng pelangi (rainbow fried rice with colourful vegetables). These adaptations underscore the dish's flexibility and its widespread presence in both household meals and street-food culture.

In addition to traditional preparations, nasi goreng has absorbed external culinary influences. Variants such as nasi goreng Jepang and nasi goreng Hongkong reflect Japanese and Chinese styles, while adaptations like nasi goreng keju incorporate Western ingredients. The extensive diversity of nasi goreng variants highlights its enduring popularity and positions the dish as a versatile canvas for regional flavours. The following list categorises these variants, providing examples by main ingredient, region, and style of preparation.

== Indonesia ==
Many variants are named after their main ingredients, others after their city or region of origin. Specific examples of nasi goreng include:

1. Nasi goreng Aceh (Acehnese fried rice), rich in spices akin to mie aceh
2. Nasi goreng amplop (egg-enveloped fried rice), known as nasi goreng pattaya in Malaysia.
3. Nasi goreng andaliman (with andaliman or locally known as "Batak pepper"), specialty of North Sumatra
4. Nasi goreng anglo chicken fried rice cooked on anglo traditional terracotta brazier which contributed to its woody charcoal aroma.
5. Nasi goreng ati ampela (with chicken liver and gizzard)
6. Nasi goreng ayam (with chicken)
7. Nasi goreng babat gongso (with tripe), a tripe fried rice from Semarang
8. Nasi goreng babi (with pork, usually served with Chinese pork belly and charsiu)
9. Nasi goreng bakar, (grilled fried rice), a hybrid between nasi goreng and nasi bakar, fried rice is wrapped inside banana leaf pocket, and grilled upon charcoal fire.
10. Nasi goreng bakso (with bakso meatball)
11. Nasi goreng Bali (Balinese fried rice), rich in spices including chopped lemongrass, turmeric, shallot, garlic and galangal, and uses no soy sauce.
12. Nasi goreng bayam (spinach fried rice)
13. Nasi goreng bebek (with fried duck)
14. Nasi goreng biru (blue fried rice) or nasi goreng bunga telang, blue-coloured fried rice acquired from bunga telang or the flower of Clitoria ternatea.
15. Nasi goreng buah merah, Papuan fried rice with extract of buah merah (Pandanus conoideus)
16. Nasi goreng buah naga (red pitaya fried rice)
17. Nasi goreng cakalang (with skipjack tuna), speciality of Manado
18. Nasi goreng cumi (with squid)
19. Nasi goreng daging asap (with smoked beef)
20. Nasi goreng daun jeruk (with shredded lime leaves) which contributed to its citrus aroma and greenish hue.
21. Nasi goreng domba (with mutton)
22. Nasi goreng dendeng lemak (with fatty dendeng thin beef jerky) also known as nasi goreng tiarbah
23. Nasi goreng ebi (with salted dried shrimp)
24. Nasi goreng gila (crazy fried rice), fried rice topped with more savoury additional ingredients including chicken, meat, shrimp, sliced bakso, sausages, egg, etc.
25. Nasi goreng hijau (green fried rice), green-coloured fried rice acquired from ground green chilli pepper and chopped lemon basil.
26. Nasi goreng hitam (black fried rice), or nasi goreng cumi hitam, coloured and flavoured with squid ink
27. Nasi goreng ikan asin (with salted fish)
28. Nasi goreng jamur (with mushroom)
29. Nasi goreng jancuk, extra hot and spicy fried rice from Surabaya
30. Nasi goreng Jawa (Javanese fried rice)
31. Nasi goreng jengkol (with jengkol stinky pea)
32. Nasi goreng kacang polong (with green peas)
33. Nasi goreng kambing (with goat meat), particularly renowned in the Kebon Sirih area in Central Jakarta.
34. Nasi goreng kebuli, a hybrid recipe of fried rice with spices akin to nasi kebuli
35. Nasi goreng kecombrang (with kecombrang or torch ginger)
36. Nasi goreng keju (with cheese, either mozzarella or cheddar)
37. Nasi goreng kencur or nasi goreng cikur in sundanese, fried rice made of rice cooked with spices made of chili, garlic, onion and kencur (aromatic ginger)
38. Nasi goreng kerang (with cockle)
39. Nasi goreng kluwek (seasoned with kluwek or keluak fruit), which create blackish colour
40. Nasi goreng kornet (with corned beef and margarine)
41. Nasi goreng krengsengan (with meat and fresh cabbage), spicy fried rice with chopped noodles and meat, similar to nasi goreng Magelangan
42. Nasi goreng kuah, fried rice with soupy chicken broth from Kediri, East Java.
43. Nasi goreng kuah susu, fried rice added with milk soup and grated cheese.
44. Nasi goreng kuah tongseng, fried rice added with tongseng soup.
45. Nasi goreng lada hitam (black pepper fried rice)
46. Nasi goreng Madura (Madura fried rice) applies fine garlic spices. Madura fried rice is common in Pontianak, it uses bean sprouts and no sweet soy sauce.
47. Nasi goreng Magelangan (Magelang fried rice) or also called as nasi goreng mawut or nasi goreng ruwet (scrambled or mixed up fried rice), a combo of fried rice and noodle with vegetables and spices
48. Nasi goreng merah or nasi goreng Makassar (red fried rice)
49. Nasi goreng nanas (pineapple fried rice), also known as nasi goreng Hawaii or nasi goreng Thailand
50. Nasi goreng oncom kencur (with oncom and kencur), a Sundanese fried rice variant
51. Nasi goreng Padang (Padang fried rice), also rich in spices similar to Aceh fried rice
52. Nasi goreng pedas, hot and spicy fried rice with chili peppers
53. Nasi goreng pelangi (rainbow fried rice), without soy sauce with colourful vegetables
54. Nasi goreng pete/petai (with green stinky bean)
55. Nasi goreng petis (with petis udang), a type of thick black shrimp paste with molasses like consistency, specialty of East Java
56. Nasi goreng petir (lit: "thunderbolt fried rice"), an extra hot and spicy fried rice
57. Nasi goreng platar or "fried rice platter", a hotel's restaurant style of serving nasi goreng.
58. Nasi goreng pliket or sego pliket (Javanese for "sticky fried rice") goat fried rice with sticky texture because of the addition of goat bone marrow.
59. Nasi goreng rawit, extra hot and spicy fried rice with cabe rawit or bird's eye chili
60. Nasi goreng rendang (rendang fried rice), rich and spicy fried rice usually made from leftover rendang spices
61. Nasi goreng rempah, spicy fried rice with ample of bumbu spice mixture
62. Nasi goreng resek, fried rice with shredded chicken, beansprouts, and cabbages, specialty of Malang city in East Java.
63. Nasi goreng roa (with halfbeak fish), also speciality of Manado
64. Nasi goreng sambal ijo/hijau (green sambal fried rice), often simply called nasi goreng hijau (green fried rice)
65. Nasi goreng sambal terasi (Sambal shrimp paste fried rice), or simply nasi goreng terasi (terasi shrimp paste fried rice)
66. Nasi goreng santri (vegetarian fried rice)
67. Nasi goreng sapi (with beef)
68. Nasi goreng sarden (with sardines)
69. Nasi goreng saus tiram (oyster sauce fried rice)
70. Nasi goreng saus teriyaki (teriyaki sauce fried rice) usually beef or chicken fried rice in teriyaki sauce, a Japanese influence in Indonesia
71. Nasi goreng seafood (with seafood, such as squid, fish, fish or shrimp meatball and shrimp)
72. Nasi goreng serundeng (with serundeng or sauteed grated coconut flakes)
73. Nasi goreng setan (devil's fried rice), extra hot and spicy fried rice with various types of chili peppers, including sambal paste, sliced fresh bird's-eye chili and chili powder.
74. Nasi goreng siram (fried rice poured with chicken and vegetables soup/sauce)
75. Nasi goreng sosis (with beef or chicken sausages)
76. Nasi goreng spesial (special fried rice) with complete ingredients, including chicken, egg mixed in rice, sausages, vegetables, and topped with sunny side up fried egg
77. Nasi goreng Sunda (Sundanese fried rice), spicy fried rice with ample of kunyit (turmeric) which add golden yellow colour
78. Nasi goreng Surabaya (Surabaya fried rice) contains chicken, shrimp, bakso (meatball), egg and vegetables
79. Nasi goreng tahu (with tofu)
80. Nasi goreng tek-tek, fried rice version of mi tek-tek noodle. Usually served by mi tek-tek peddler that announce their presence in the neighborhood by hitting the metal wok creating "tek-tek" sounds.
81. Nasi goreng telur (with egg)
82. Nasi goreng telur asin (with salted duck egg)
83. Nasi goreng tembakau (with tobacco seeds), specialty of Temanggung, a tobacco plantation area
84. Nasi goreng terasi (with terasi shrimp paste)
85. Nasi goreng teri Medan (with Medan's anchovy)
86. Nasi goreng tomat (tomato fried rice)
87. Nasi goreng tongkol asap (with smoked mackerel tuna)
88. Nasi goreng tuna (with tuna)
89. Nasi goreng udang (with shrimp)
90. Nasi goreng usus (with intestine)

Indonesians also called foreign versions of fried rice simply as nasi goreng, thus nasi goreng Hongkong and nasi goreng Tionghoa/China refer to Chinese fried rice, while nasi goreng Jepang refer to yakimeshi or chahan.

== Brunei, Malaysia and Singapore ==
Popular variants of nasi goreng in Brunei, Malaysia and Singapore include:

1. Nasi goreng ayam (fried rice usually served with crispy fried chicken with sweet chilli sauce)
2. Nasi goreng belacan (fried with leftover sambal belacan and fish or other meats)
3. Nasi goreng blackpepper (fried rice with chicken or beef in blackpepper sauce)
4. Nasi goreng cendawan (fried rice cooked with mushrooms)
5. Nasi goreng cili api/masak pedas (spicy fried rice served with chicken/beef)
6. Nasi goreng chicken chop (Malaysian Eurasian food)
7. Nasi goreng dabai (a Sarawak speciality which the rice is fried with a seasonal native fruit called 'buah dabai' (Borneo olive)).
8. Nasi goreng daging/kambing (fried rice with beef or mutton)
9. Nasi goreng ikan masin (fried with salted fish)
10. Nasi goreng kampung (fried with anchovies/leftover fried fish, kangkong)
11. Nasi goreng kerabu (fried rice with local salads)
12. Nasi goreng kunyit (fried rice served with turmeric and meat with onions, long beans and carrots)
13. Nasi goreng kari (fried rice cooked with curry)
14. Nasi goreng ladna (fried rice cooked with seafood and vegetables in white gravy)
15. Nasi goreng masak merah (fried rice with chicken or beef in chilli gravy)
16. Nasi goreng mamak (Indian Muslim style nasi goreng)
17. Nasi goreng nenas (fried rice cooked with pineapples)
18. Nasi goreng paprik (fried rice served with paprik dish, usually chicken)
19. Nasi goreng pattaya (fried rice in an omelette envelope which is topped with chili sauce or tomato sauce, sometimes includes chicken)
20. Nasi goreng petai (fried rice cooked with parkia speciosa)
21. Nasi goreng seafood (fried with prawn, calamari slices and crab sticks)
22. Nasi goreng sotong (fried rice cooked with calamary)
23. Nasi goreng telur (fried rice served with fried eggs)
24. Nasi goreng tomyam (fried rice cooked in tomyum paste)
25. Nasi goreng udang (fried rice cooked with prawn)
26. Nasi goreng USA (fried rice with three core ingredients namely prawn (udang), squid (sotong) and chicken (ayam))
27. Nasi goreng Amerika (with fried egg and stir fried beef in chili sauce)
28. Nasi goreng pulau Brunei (floating fried rice, a Brunei specialty)
29. Nasi goreng belutak (fried rice with belutak, the traditional Bruneian beef sausage)
30. Nasi goreng corned beef (fried with corned beef, popular in Brunei and Sarawak)

== Gallery ==
Nasi goreng variants

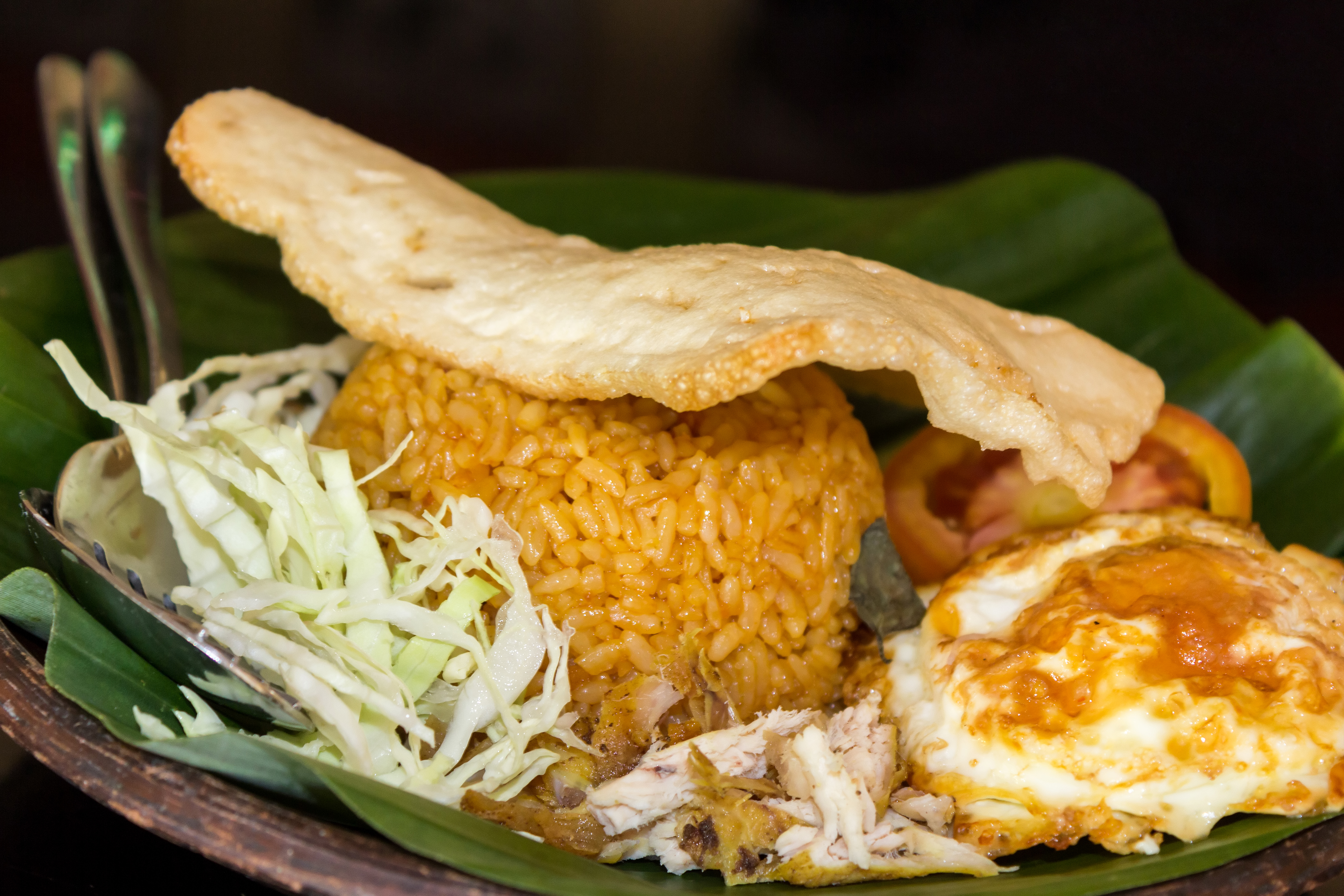
Nasi goreng with chicken, egg and prawn cracker

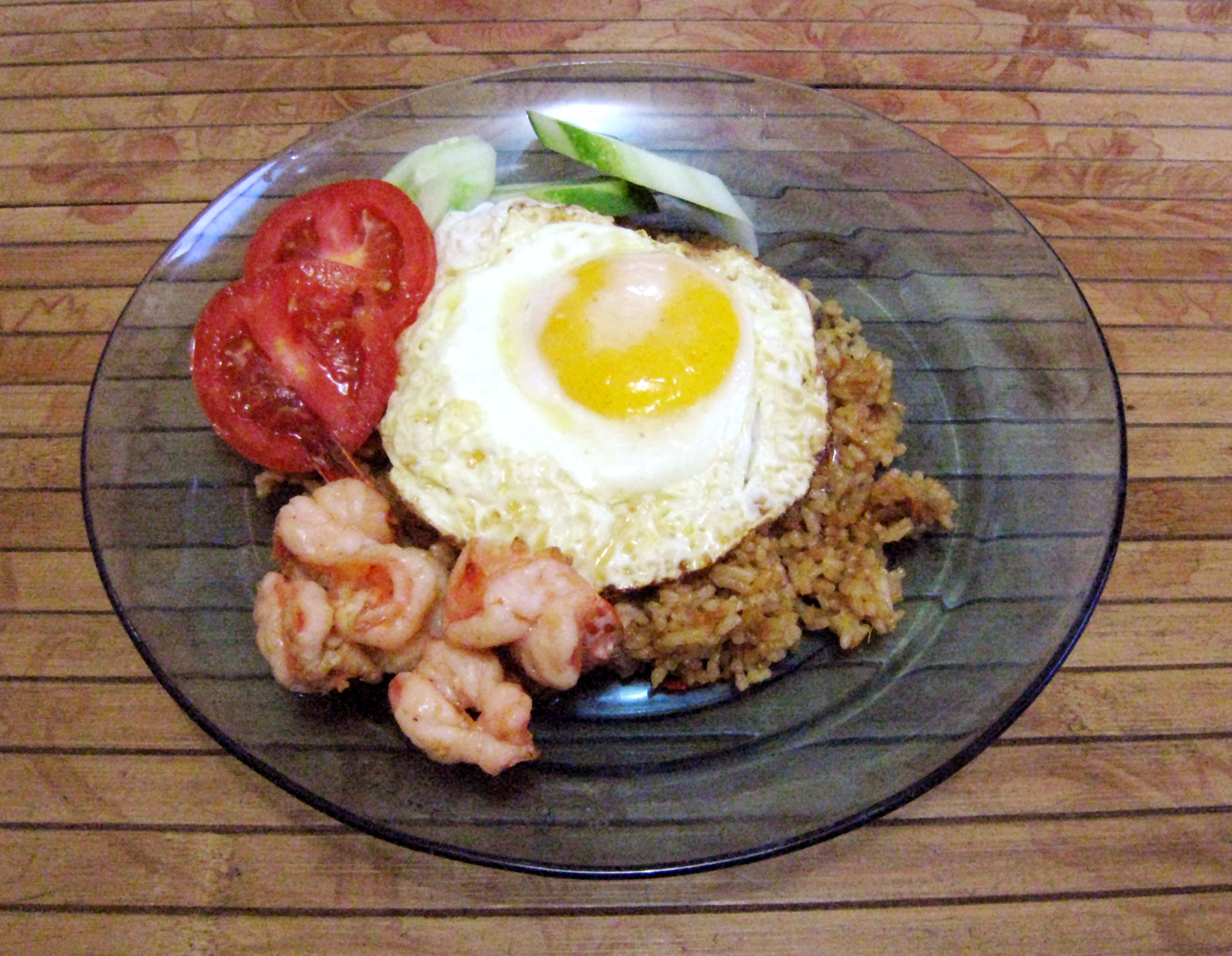
Nasi goreng with shrimp and egg, typical Indonesian breakfast

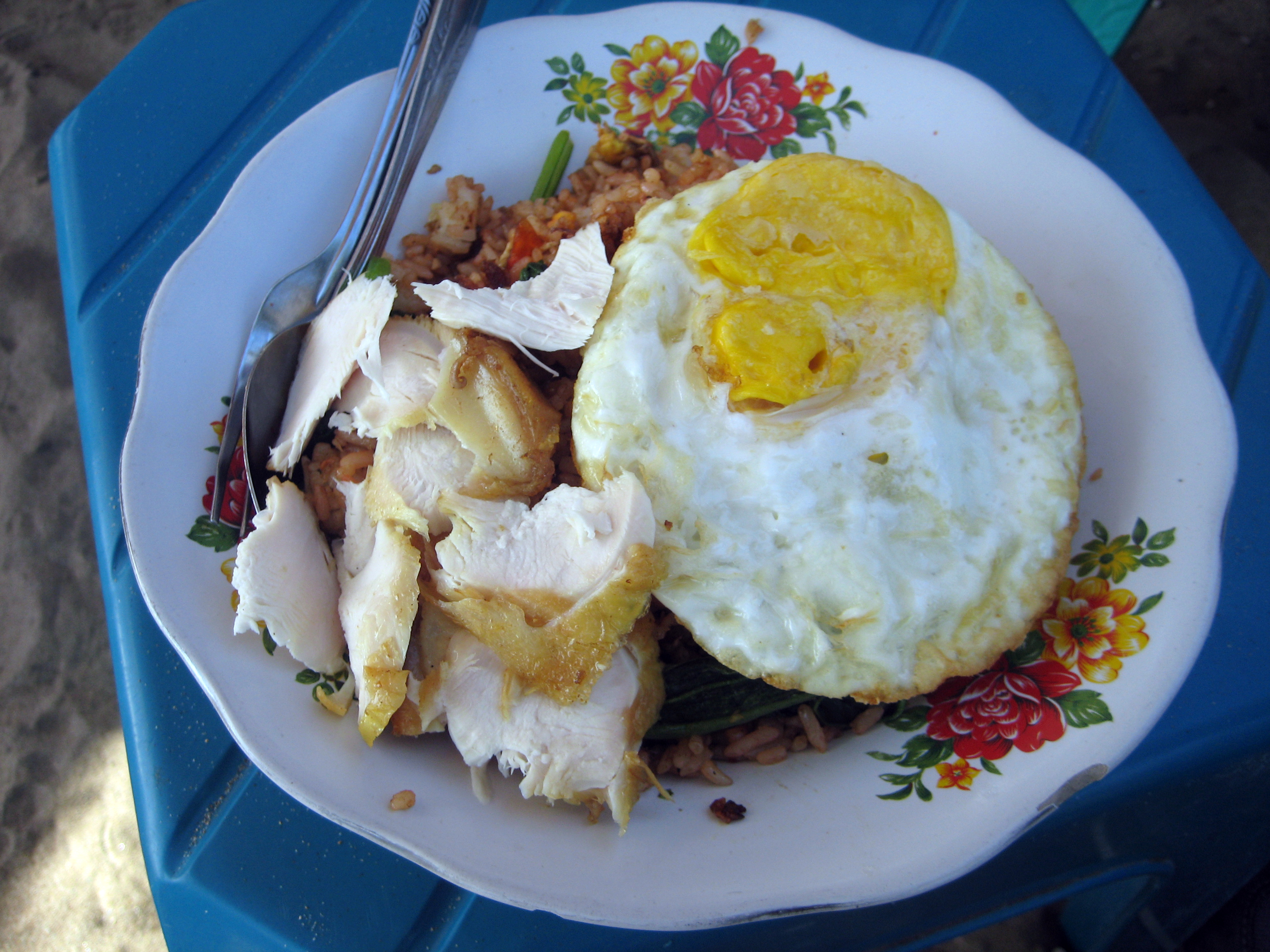
Nasi goreng with chicken and egg in Bali

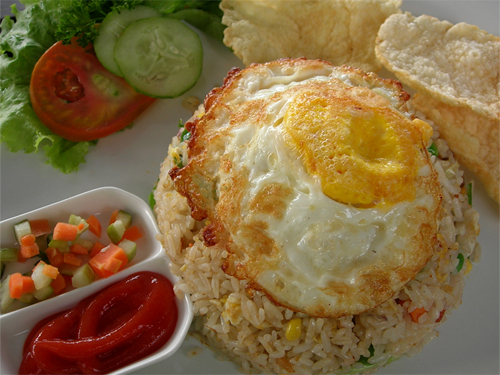
Nasi goreng with salted fish and egg

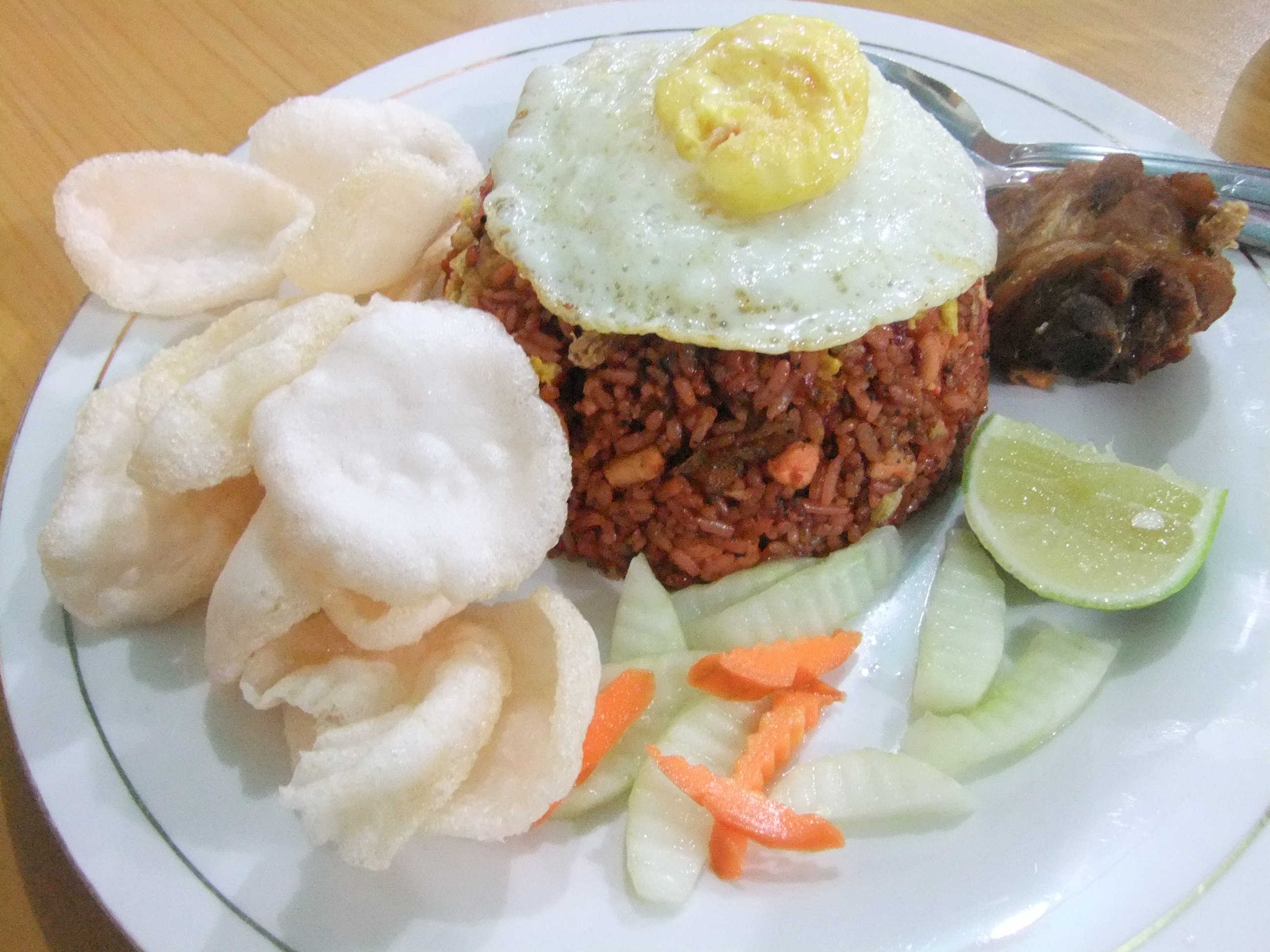
Red nasi goreng in Rantepao, South Sulawesi

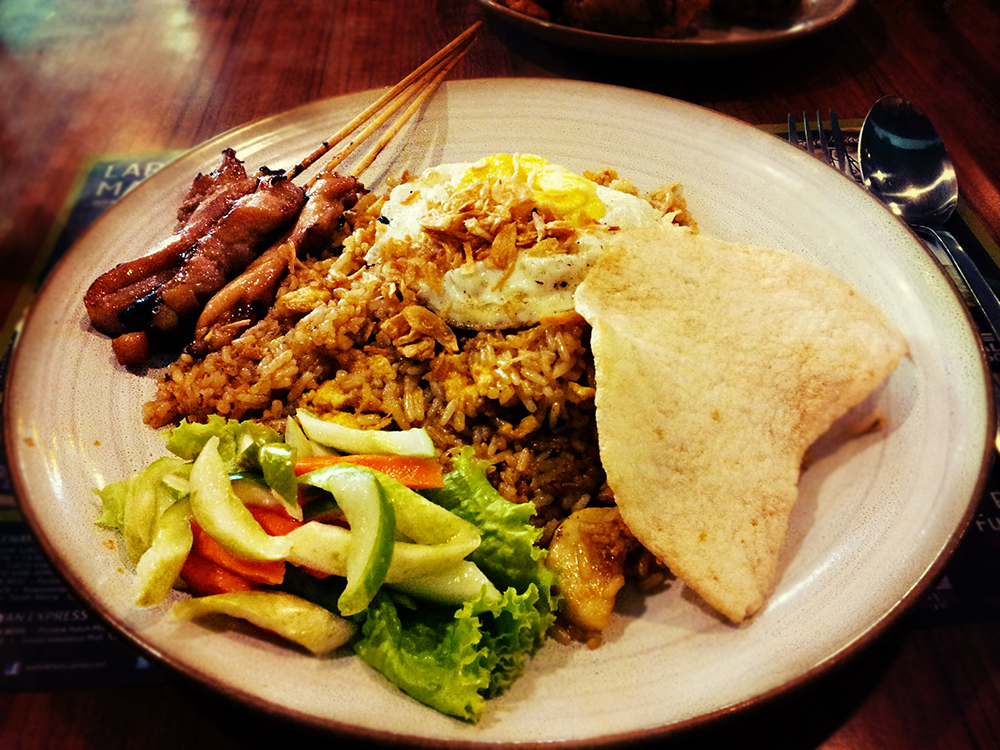
Nasi goreng-chicken satay combo, quintessential Indonesian dish among foreigners

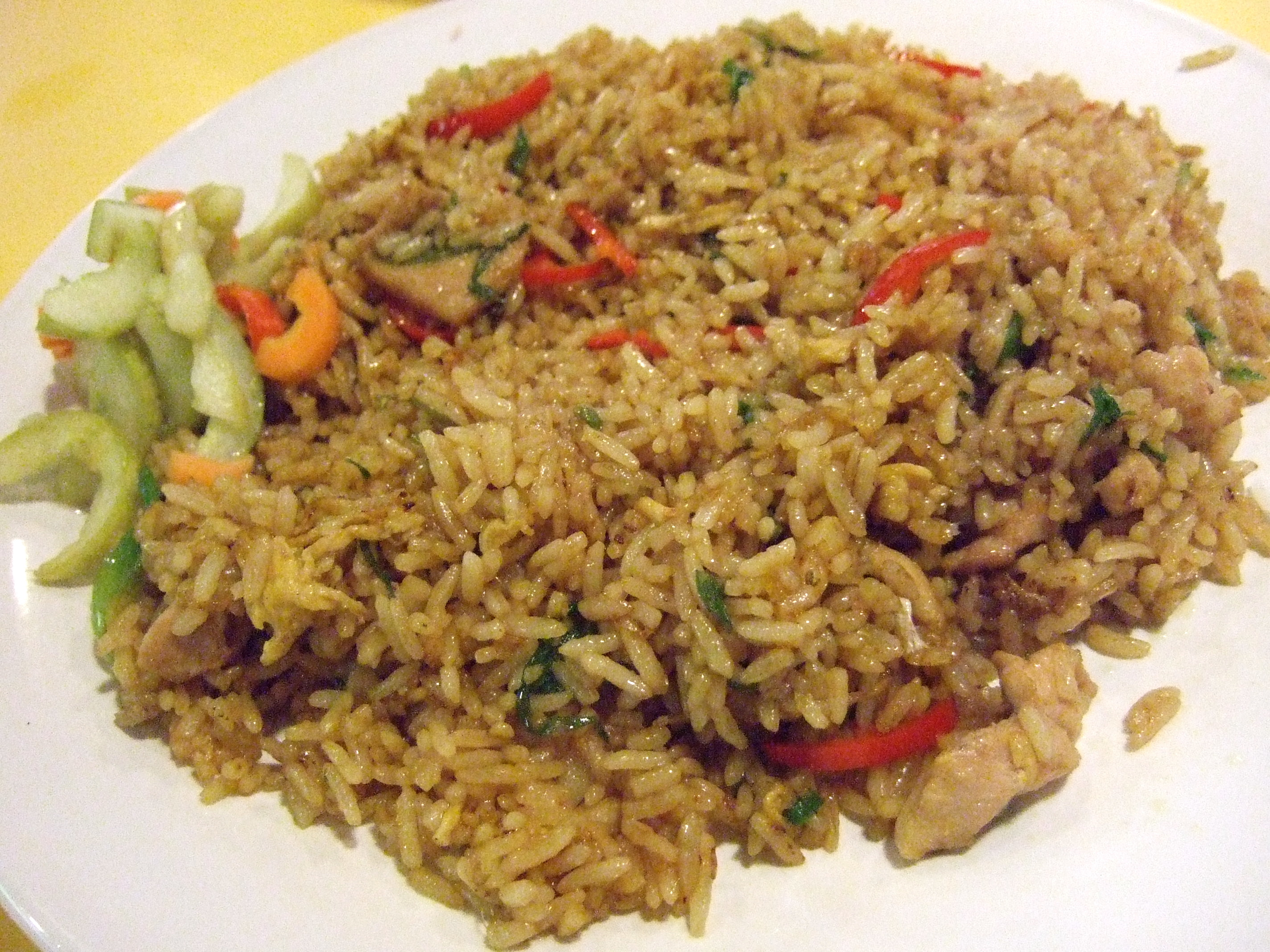
Nasi goreng "Chinese style" in Jakarta

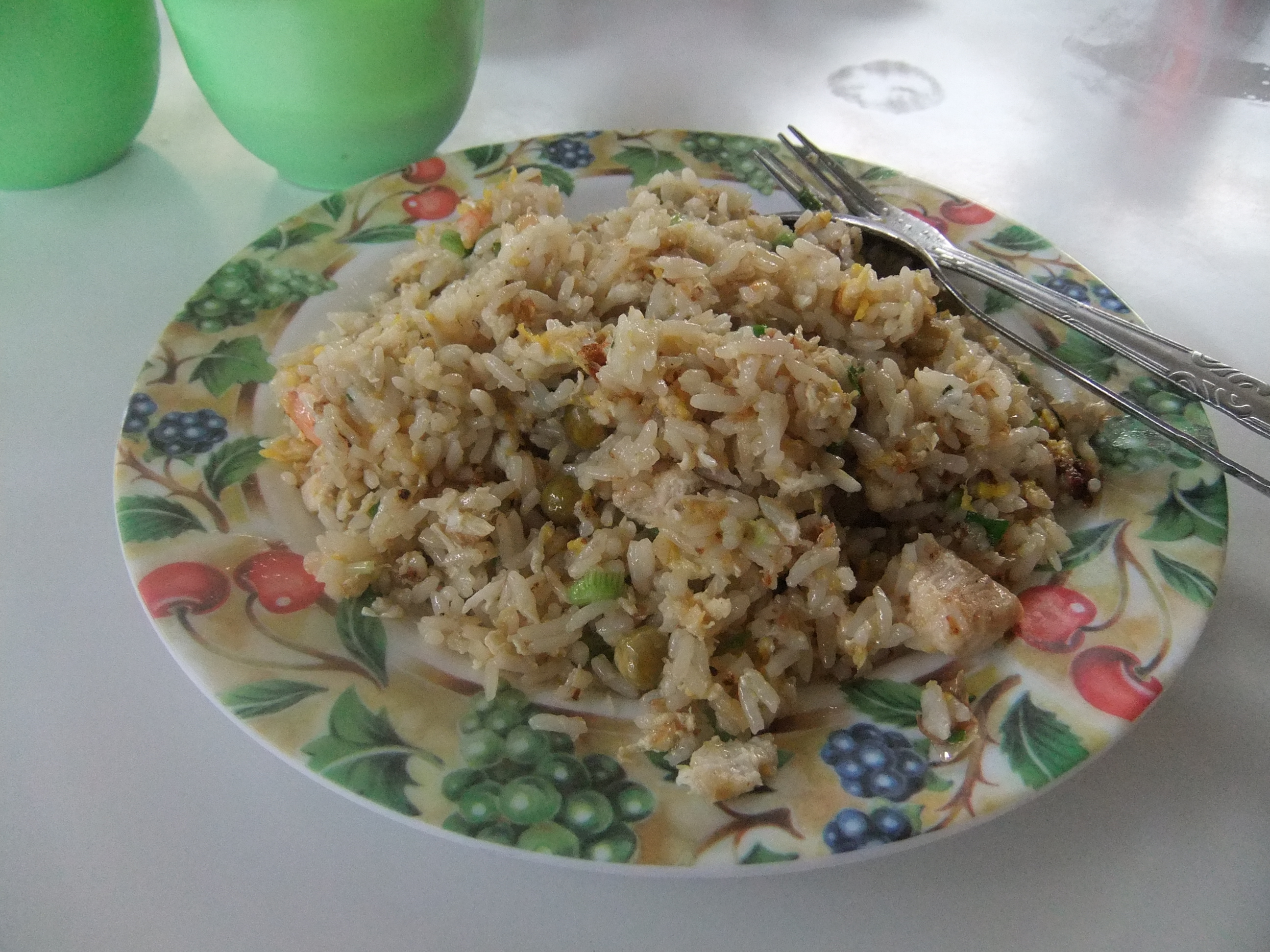
Nasi goreng "Hong Kong style" in Mataram, Lombok

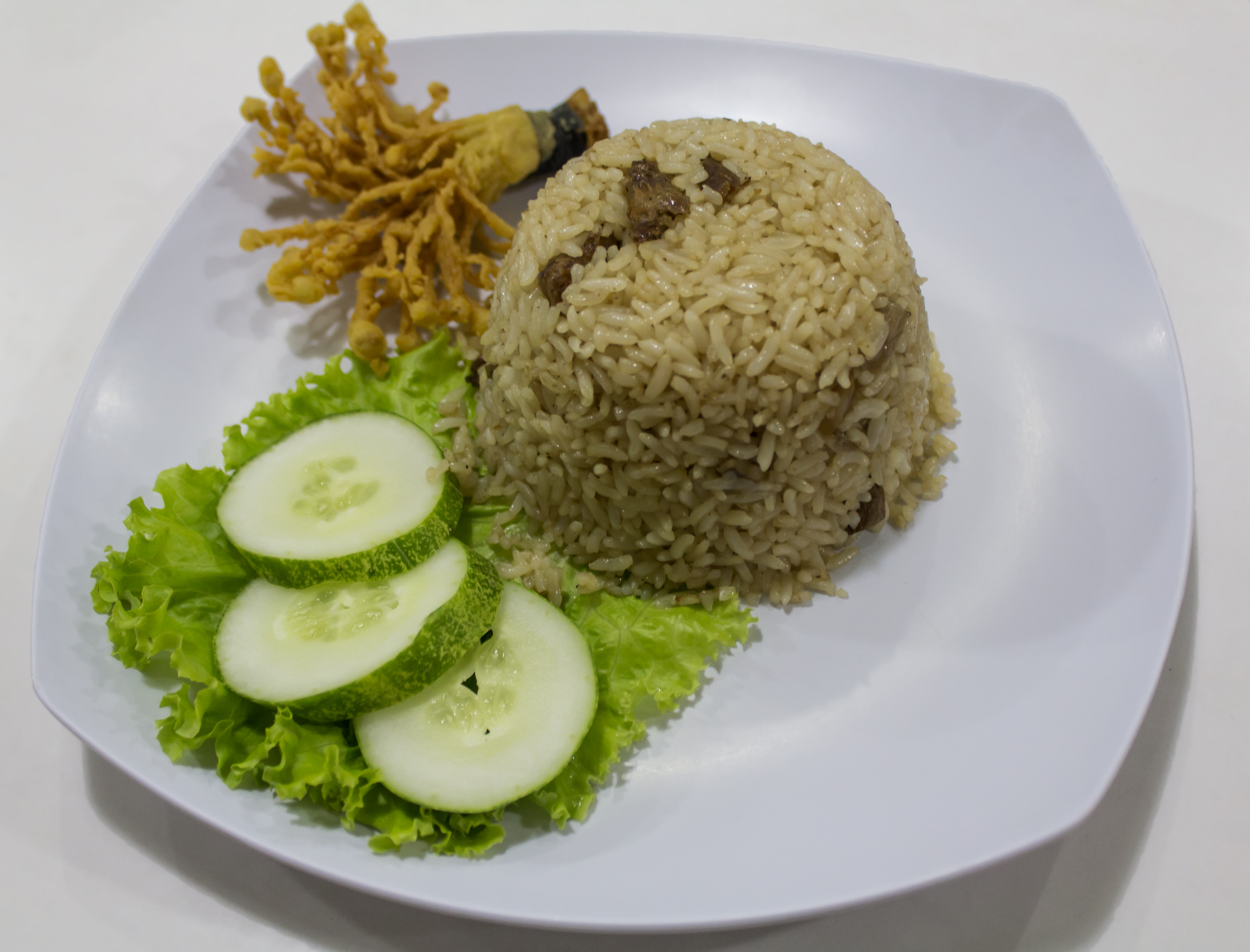
Mushroom nasi goreng in Yogyakarta

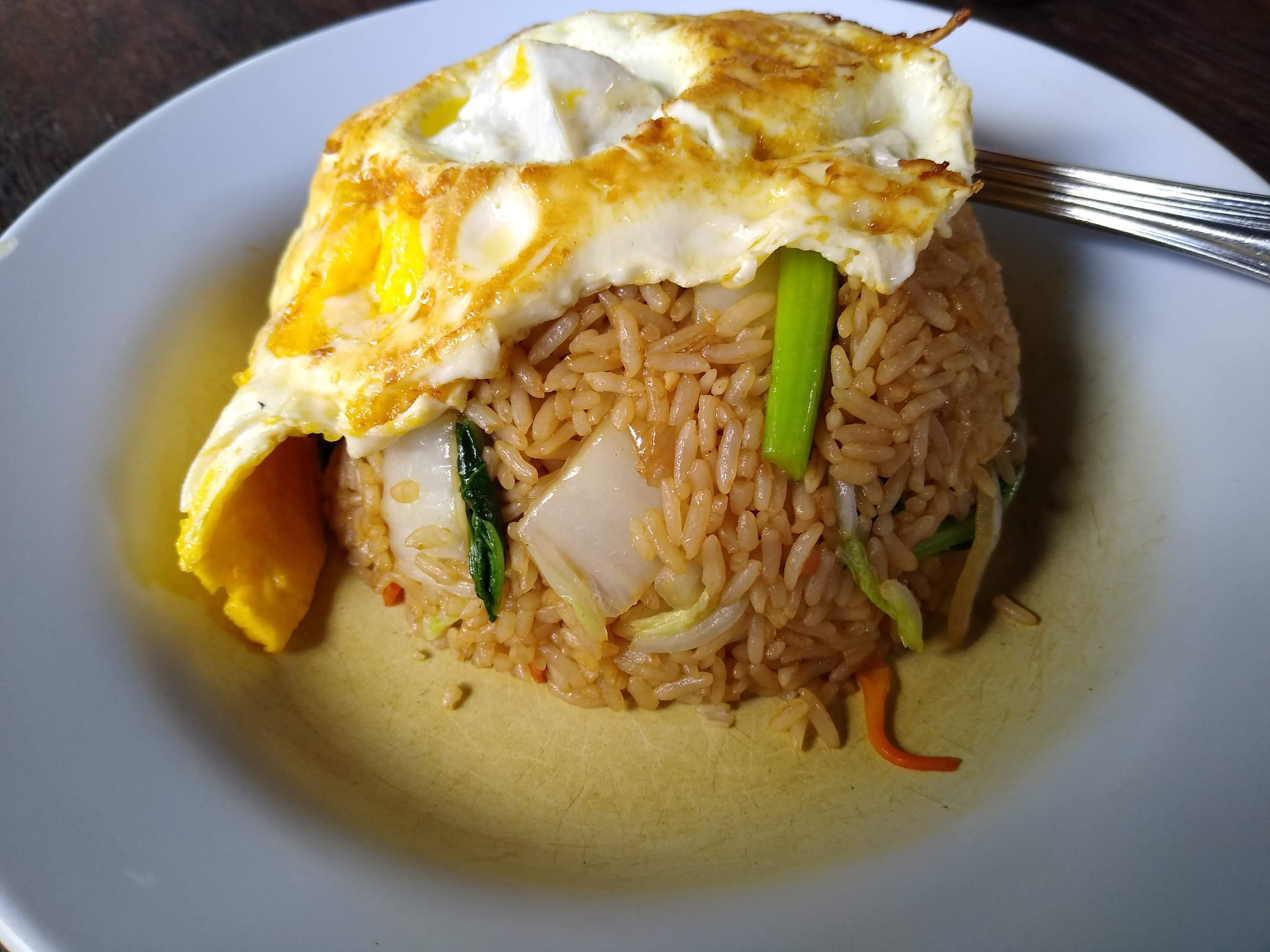
Vegetarian nasi goreng in Bali

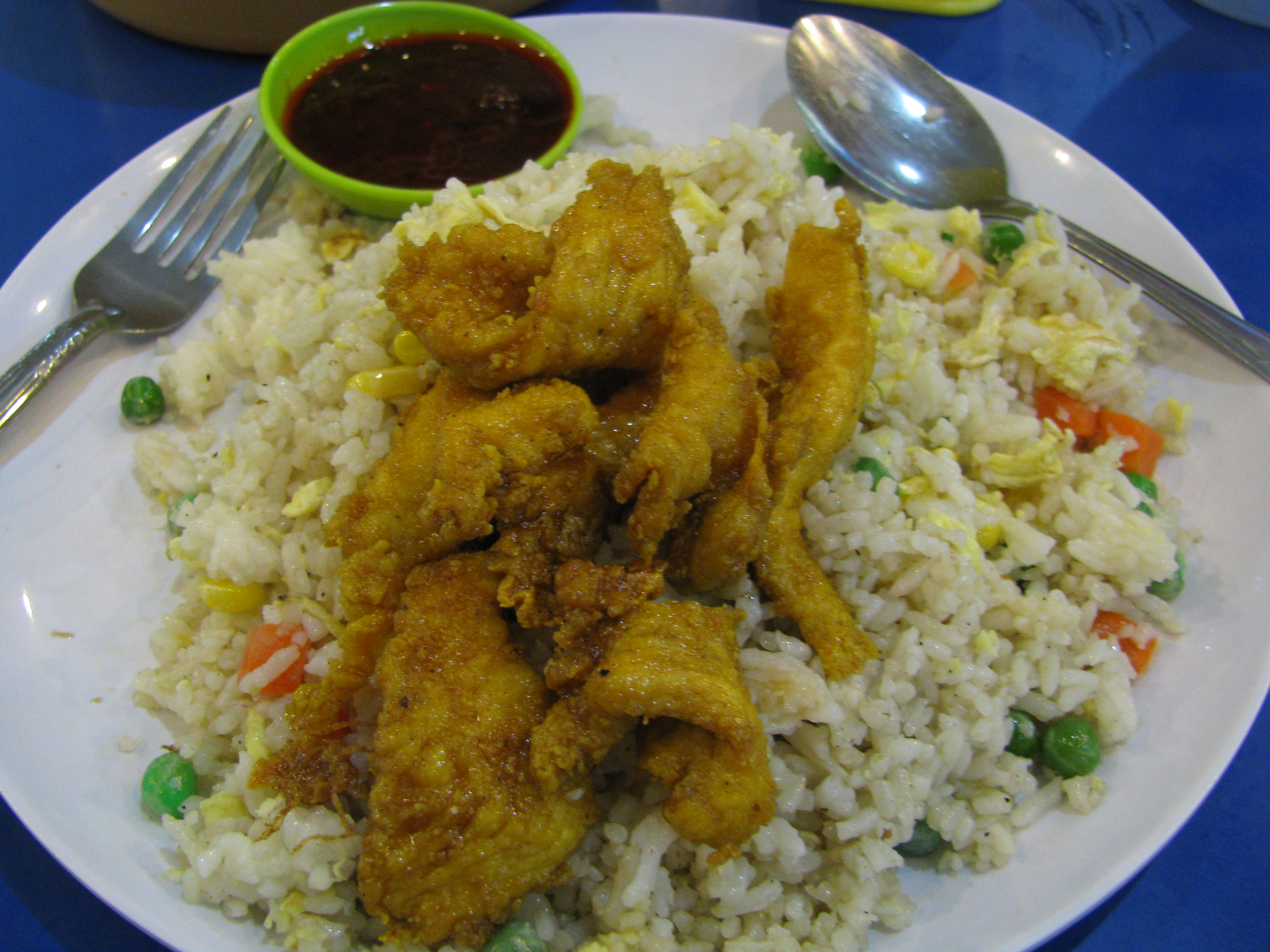
Nasi goreng seafood in Sandakan, Sabah

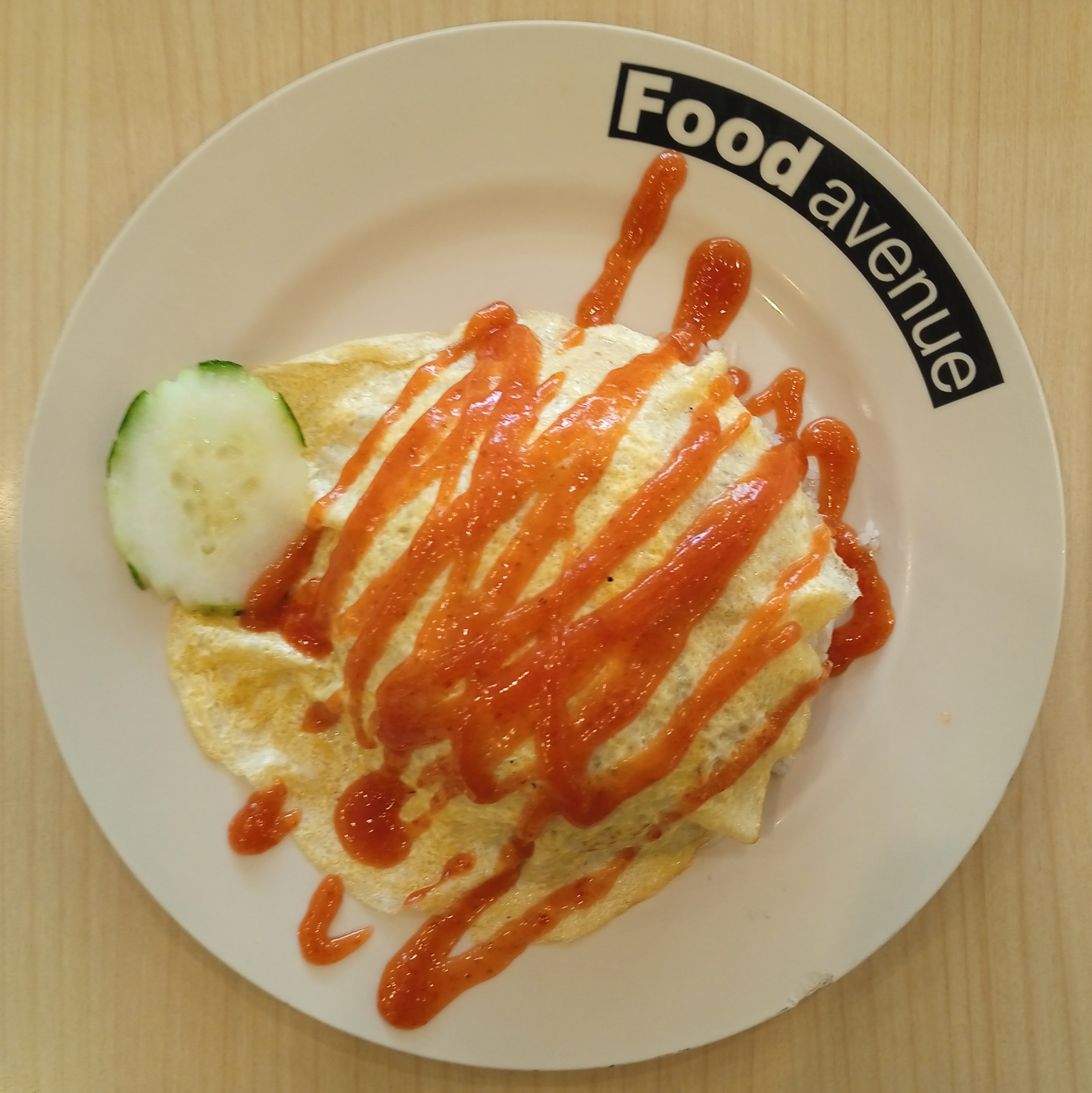
Nasi goreng pattaya in Kuala Lumpur; also known as Nasi goreng amplop in Indonesia

== See also ==
- Fried rice
  - List of fried rice dishes
  - Sinangág
- Cuisine of Brunei
- Cuisine of Indonesia
- Cuisine of Malaysia
- Cuisine of Singapore
- Cuisine of the Netherlands
- Biryani
