= Nasi goreng jawa =

Javanese-style of fried rice

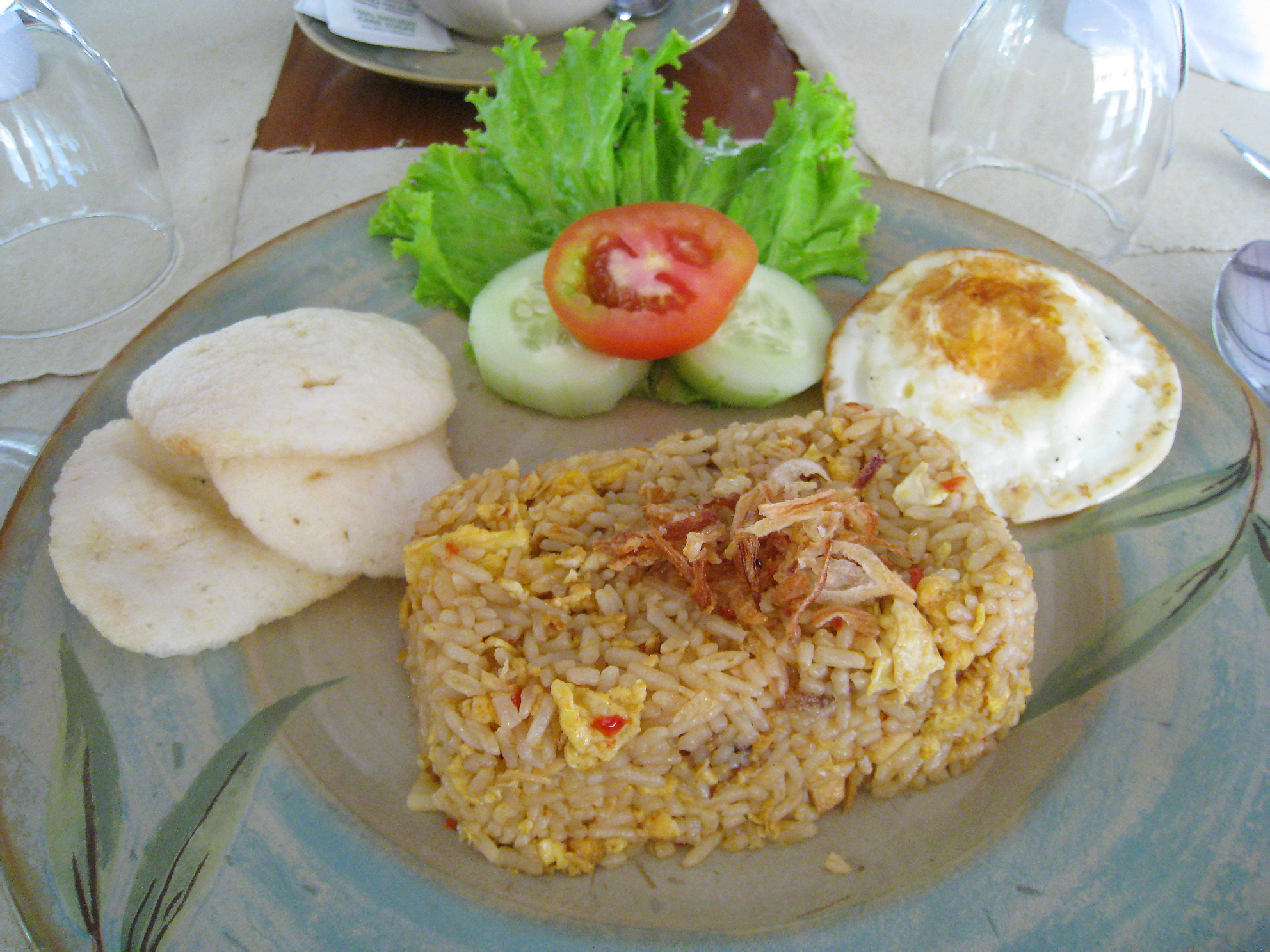
- A plate of nasi goreng jawa from Surakarta, Central Java
- Course: Main course
- Place of origin: Indonesia
- Region or state: Java
- Associated cuisine: Indonesia
- Main ingredients: Fried rice with meats, vegetables, pickles, spices, sweet soy sauce, and sambal
- Variations: Rich variations across the respective region

Nasi goreng jawa (Indonesian for Javanese fried rice, Javanese: sega goreng jawa) is a Javanese-style of fried rice originated from Java, Indonesia. This dish can be found in Javanese cuisine and quite popular in Indonesia, especially Java. Commonly, this rice dish uses sambal ulek as seasoning and has a spicy taste.

== Variation ==
- Nasi goreng babat from Semarang which is slightly brown in color with tripe as a side dish.
- Nasi goreng Solo (Central Java) which is pink in color with a side dish of cabbage and shredded free-range chicken.
- Nasi goreng Surabaya which is red-brown in color, the portion is large, and slightly spicy with a side dish of sliced omelet and chicken.
- Nasi goreng kampung from Yogyakarta which is red in color with side dishes of sunny-side up eggs and free-range chicken.

== See also ==
- Fried rice
  - List of fried rice dishes
- Cuisine of Indonesia
- Nasi goreng
- Nasi goreng pattaya
- Nasi minyak
