= Nasi goreng =

Southeast Asian rice dish

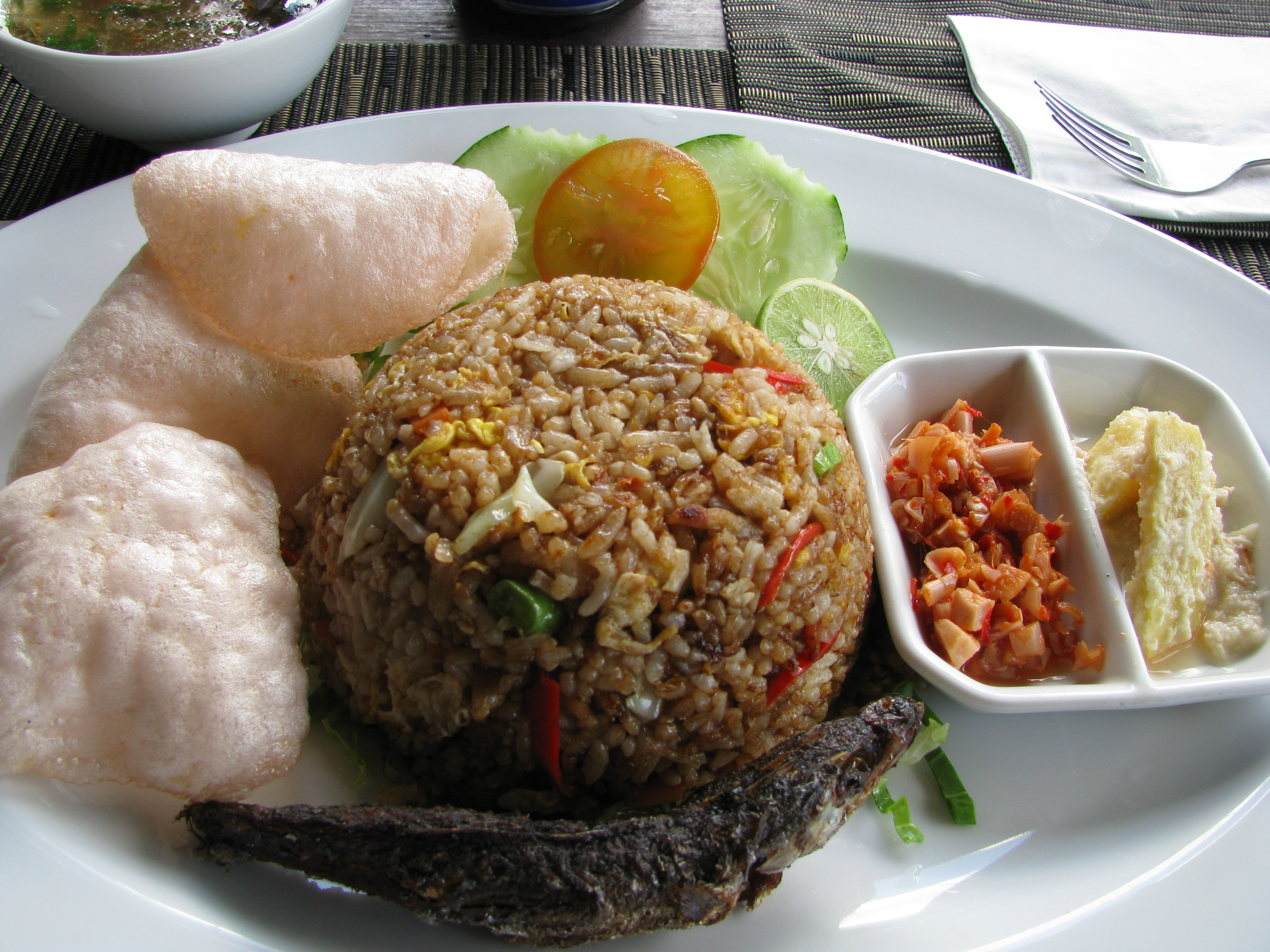
- Nasi goreng – fried rice with krupuk/keropok (traditional cracker), fish and pickles.
- Alternative names: Indonesian fried rice (English); Malaysian fried rice (English)
- Course: Main course
- Place of origin: China, Maritime Southeast Asia
- Region or state: Nationwide in Indonesia, Malaysia, Singapore and Brunei; also popular in Southern Thailand, Sri Lanka, Suriname and the Netherlands
- Associated cuisine: Indonesian, Malaysian, Bruneian and Singaporean
- Created by: Peranakan Chinese in Maritime Southeast Asia
- Main ingredients: Fried rice with meats, vegetables and spices, usually seasoned with sweet soy sauce
- Variations: Rich variations across the respective region

Nasi goreng (English pronunciation: /ˌnɑːsi ɡɒˈrɛŋ/), (Indonesian and Malay for 'fried rice') is a Southeast Asian rice dish typically prepared with pre-cooked rice stir-fried in a small amount of oil or margarine and seasoned with ingredients such as sweet soy sauce, shallots, garlic, ground shrimp paste, tamarind and chilli. It is commonly served with additional ingredients, including egg, chicken, prawns and vegetables.

The dish is widely consumed across Maritime Southeast Asia, particularly in Indonesia, Malaysia, Singapore, Brunei, and southern Thailand, where it forms part of daily meals, street-food culture and festive cuisine. Nasi goreng is distinguished from other Asian fried rice recipes by its aromatic, smoky flavour, often derived from caramelised sweet soy sauce and powdered shrimp paste, and is generally spicier than Chinese-style fried rice. Over time, many regional variations of nasi goreng have emerged, reflecting local ingredients, culinary influences and distinctive cooking techniques.

Beyond the region, nasi goreng has gained international recognition, being consumed in countries such as Sri Lanka, Suriname and the Netherlands, reflecting historical patterns of migration and culinary exchange. It is regarded as a national dish of Indonesia, while in Malaysia it is officially recognised as part of the country’s national culinary heritage. In English, the dish is sometimes described as Indonesian or Malaysian fried rice, reflecting its prominence and cultural significance in these national cuisines.

== Etymology ==
Nasi goreng means "fried rice" in Malay, a term also inherited by the Indonesian language.

While Malay speakers use it to describe all kinds of fried rice dishes, in English, nasi goreng refers specifically to the variants found in Indonesia and Malaysia. The Cambridge English Dictionary describes nasi goreng as "an Indonesian rice dish with pieces of meat and vegetables added". Collins English Dictionary defines it as "a dish, originating in Malaysia, consisting of rice fried with a selection of other ingredients". The Oxford English Dictionary also includes the term, identifying it as a dish found in both Indonesian and Malaysian cuisines.

Although not usually mentioned in English definitions, the dish is also common and an established part of the culinary tradition in neighboring countries such as Singapore and Brunei.

== History ==
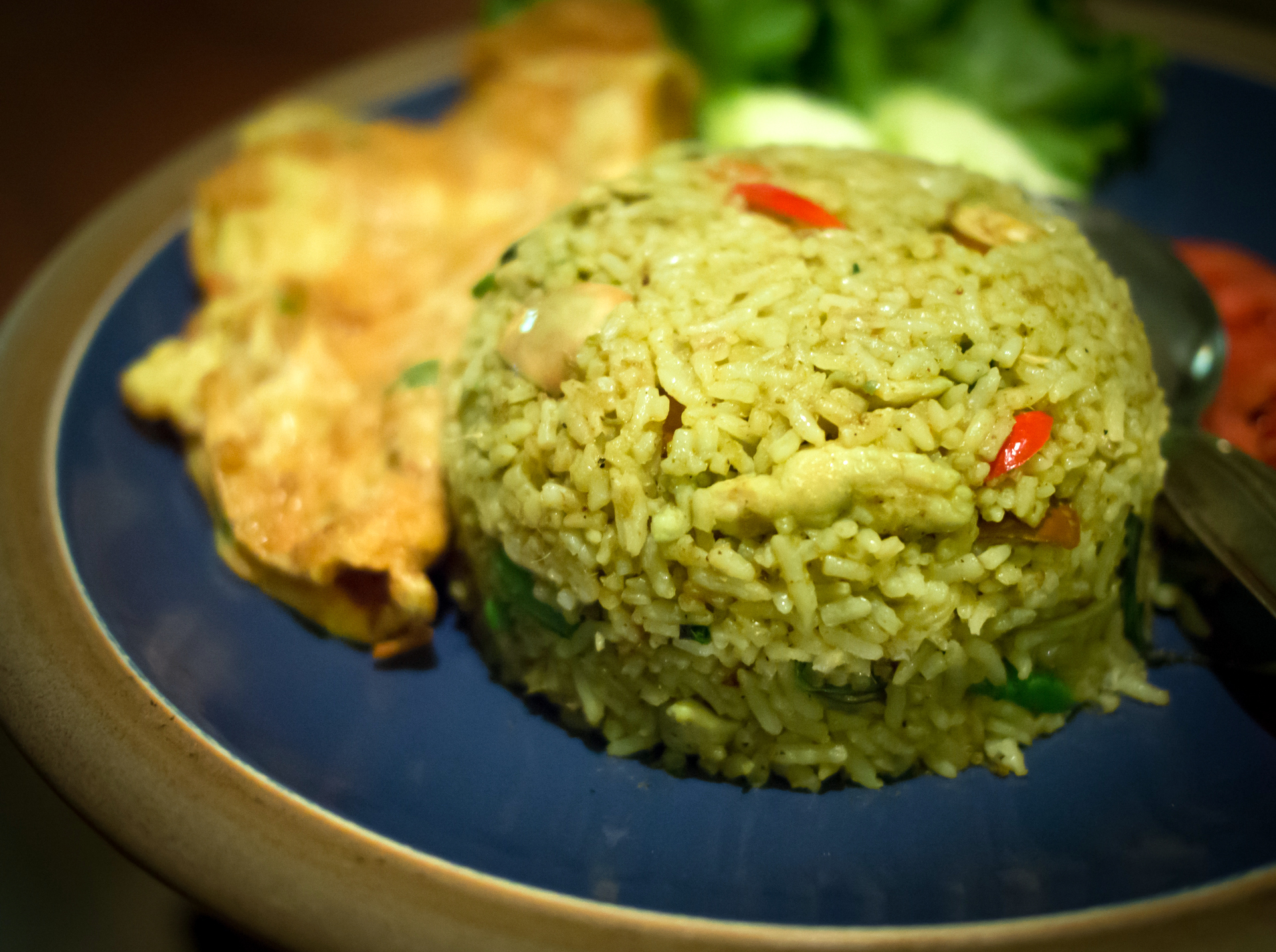
Thai Khao phat

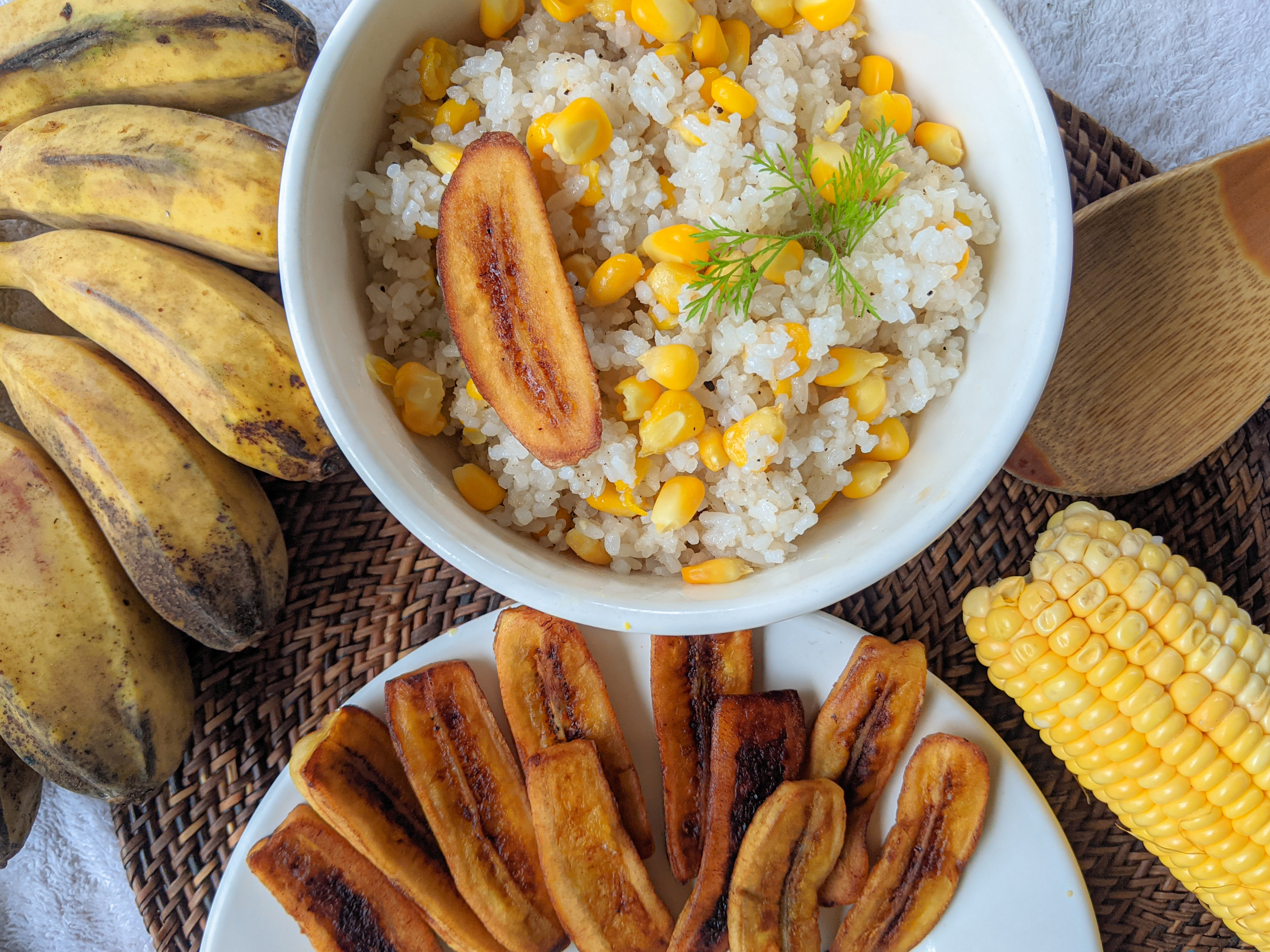
Filipino Sinangag

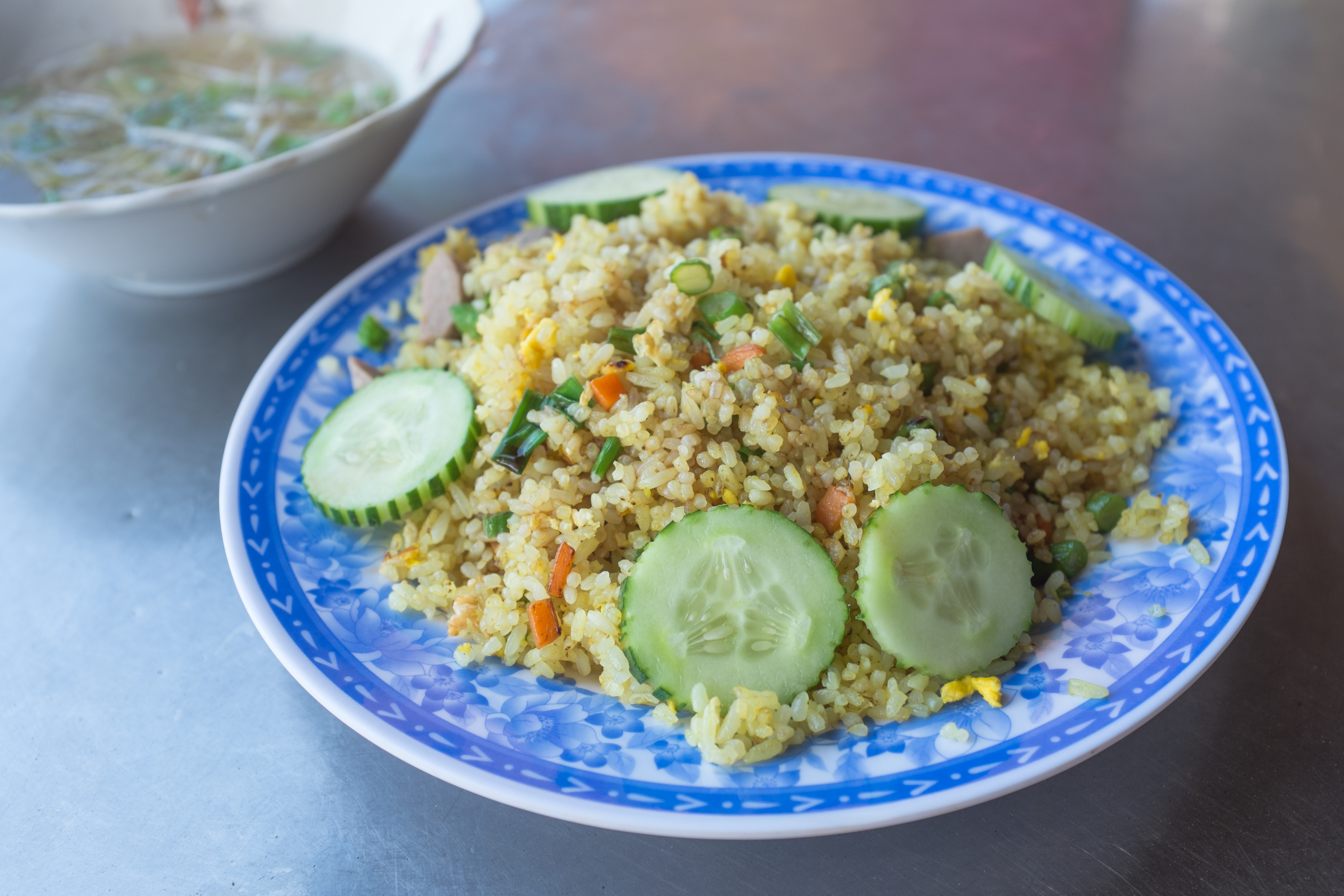
Vietnamese Cơm Chiên

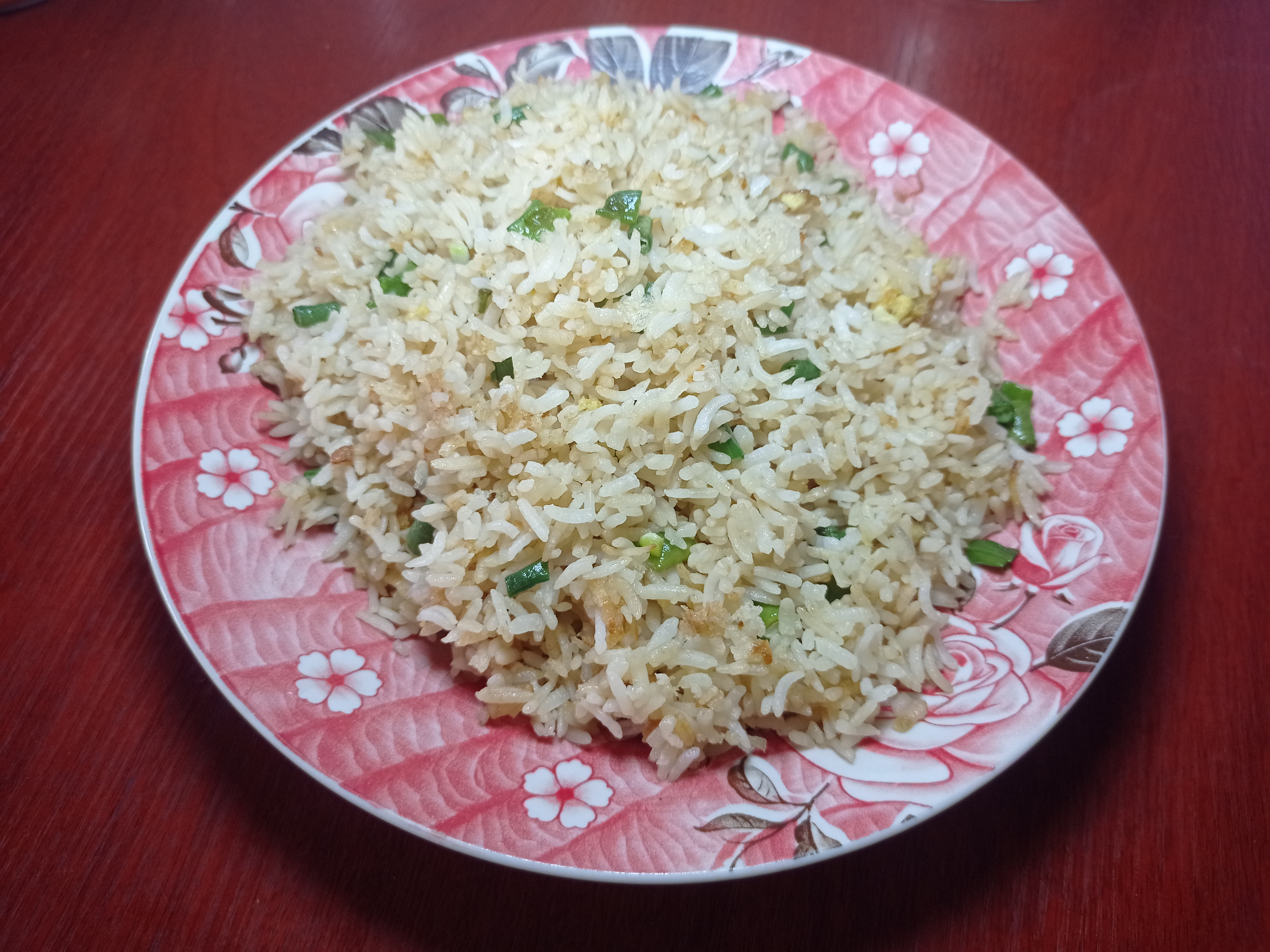
Burmese htamin gyaw

Regional adaptations of fried rice across Southeast Asia, illustrating Chinese culinary influence and localised development similar to nasi goreng.

=== Origins in China ===
Fried rice is generally believed to have originated in China during the Sui dynasty (589–618 CE), particularly in the city of Yangzhou. It was developed as a practical solution for using leftover rice, which would otherwise harden after cooling. By stir-frying day-old rice with oil, eggs, vegetables and small amounts of meat, households were able to create a new dish that was both flavourful and economical.

The technique of stir-frying, known in Chinese as chǎo, was already a central feature of Chinese cooking. By the early medieval period, stir-frying had become one of the most versatile methods of preparing quick meals, allowing ingredients to be cooked evenly and seasoned efficiently in a hot wok. Fried rice thus fit seamlessly into the established culinary repertoire, eventually becoming a common staple in many Chinese regional cuisines.

Over time, different variations of fried rice developed within China, particularly in southern regions such as Fujian and Guangdong, where rice was the dominant staple. These southern styles would later influence the kinds of fried rice that spread abroad through migration and trade, laying the foundation for adaptations in Southeast Asia.

Similar to other fried rice recipes in Asia, commentators have suggested that Malay and Indonesian-style nasi goreng can trace its origins to Chinese fried rice, and was likely developed as a way to avoid wasting rice. The Chinese influences upon Indonesian cuisine can be seen in mie goreng that appeared simultaneously with the introduction of the stir frying technique that required the use of a Chinese wok. In China, the stir frying technique became increasingly popular during the Ming dynasty (1368–1644 CE). The common soy sauce has its origin in 2nd-century CE China; however, kecap manis (sweet soy sauce) was developed in Indonesia with a generous addition of local palm sugar.

=== Introduction to Southeast Asia through Chinese migration and culinary influence ===
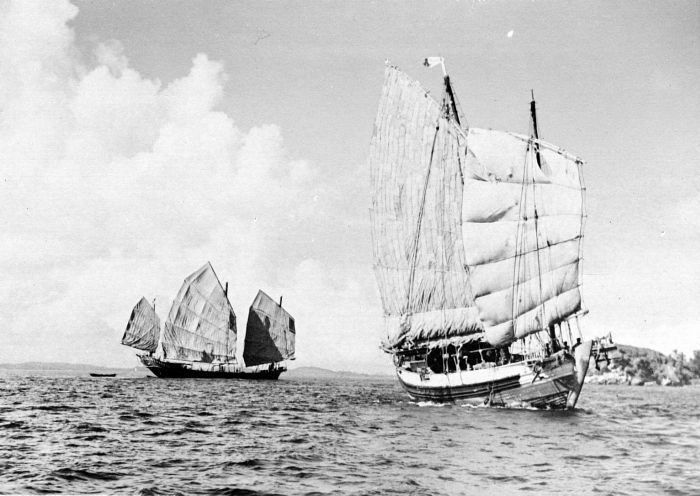
Chinese junks carried merchants and sailors across the South China Sea, spreading foodways such as fried rice

The expansion of Chinese maritime trade from the Tang dynasty (7th–10th centuries) established enduring connections between China and Southeast Asia. Chinese merchants, sailors and envoys regularly visited major ports and trading centres across Java, Sumatra, the Malay Peninsula, Borneo, Indochina and the Philippines. These ports became hubs of cultural exchange, where culinary practices merged with local religion, language and material culture.

It is unclear when the people of present-day Indonesia began to adopt the practice of cooking fried rice. The trade between China and the Indonesian archipelago flourished from the era of Srivijaya around the 10th century and intensified in the Majapahit era around the 15th century. By that time Chinese immigrants had begun to settle in the archipelago, bringing along with them their culture and cuisine. Chinese people usually favor freshly cooked hot food, and it is taboo to throw away uneaten foodstuffs in their culture. As a result, the previous day's leftover rice was often recooked in the morning. Gregory Rodgers suggested that frying the rice could prevent the propagation of dangerous microbes, especially in pre-refrigeration technology in Indonesia, and also avoid the need to throw out precious food.

Within these exchanges, Chinese cooking techniques and dishes began to take root. Fried rice, with its simplicity and adaptability, was particularly well suited to maritime communities. The dish required only basic cooking equipment, a small amount of oil and whatever ingredients were readily available. Its portability and reliance on leftover rice made it practical for both travellers and settled communities.

Beyond temporary traders, long-term migration from southern China brought large numbers of Hokkien, Cantonese, Hakka and Teochew settlers to South-East Asia between the 10th and 19th centuries. These communities established themselves in major port cities and trading centres such as Batavia (modern Jakarta), Semarang, Medan, Malacca, Penang, Singapore, Bangkok, Saigon and Manila, others settled in smaller towns and rural areas, particularly in regions linked to agriculture, mining and riverine trade. These communities formed Chinatowns, built temples and maintained strong culinary traditions.

Among the dishes they introduced were fried rice, noodles, dumplings and stir-fried vegetables, all prepared with techniques familiar from southern China. Over time, these dishes began to be adopted by local populations, who incorporated their own spices and ingredients. Fried rice in particular became a bridge between Chinese and local cuisines, as it could be easily adapted to different palates and available foodstuffs.

=== Local adaptation ===
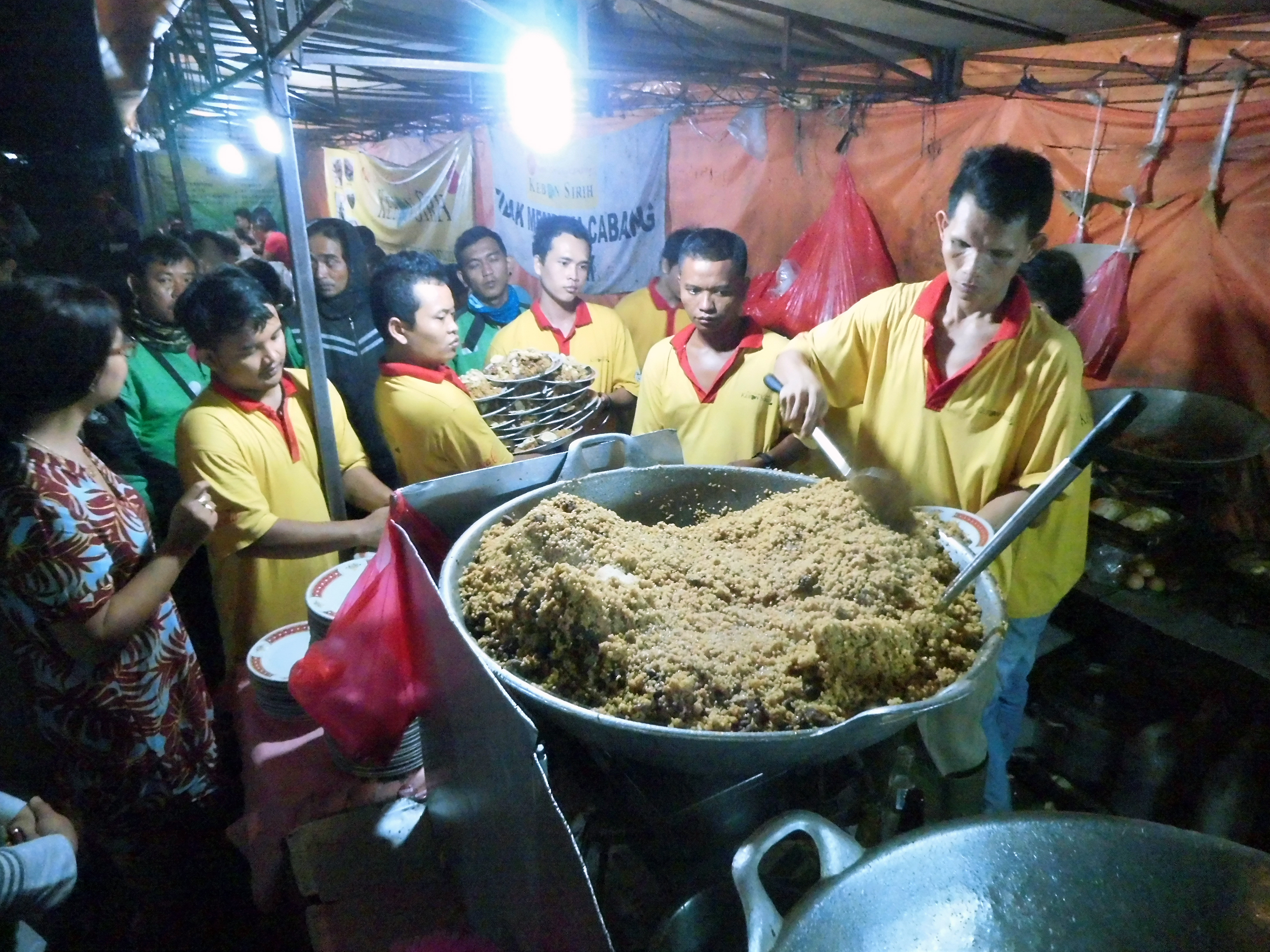
Stir-frying nasi goreng kambing (fried rice with goat meat) in bulk in Kebon Sirih, Central Jakarta, demonstrating the core wok technique used in fried rice preparation.

Nasi goreng is mentioned in early 19th century Javanese literature Serat Centhini as sekul goreng. However, according to Harry Nazarudin, a culinary expert, the fried rice written in this Javanese book is different from the fried rice we know today. This fried rice is made without using soy sauce and is not eaten as a single dish like fried rice in general, but is a variant of rice that is eaten with side dishes. On the island of Java there are two types of fried rice; the Sundanese gagrak fried rice is savory, and the Javanese one tends to be sweet. Sekul goreng mentioned in Serat Centhini is the closest to the Sundanese version.

Writer Fadly Rahman from Padjajaran University claimed that there is no historical evidence that proves that nasi goreng is native to Indonesia, and suggested another theory besides Chinese influence: that nasi goreng was actually inspired by a Middle Eastern dish called pilaf, which is rice cooked in seasoned broth. A particular variant, Betawi-style nasi goreng kambing (goat fried rice), uses mutton or goat meat (traditionally favoured by Arab Indonesians), rich spices and minyak samin (ghee), all typical ingredients used in the preparation of Middle-eastern pilaf.

By the 19th century, colonial-era records described fried rice as part of the daily diet in Javanese and Malay households. Its popularity was linked to practicality: leftover rice could be quickly transformed into a complete meal, often supplemented with eggs, small amounts of meat or salted fish. By the early 20th century, Dutch–Indonesian cookbooks included recipes for nasi goreng, indicating its integration into both local and colonial kitchens.

=== Colonial-era influence ===
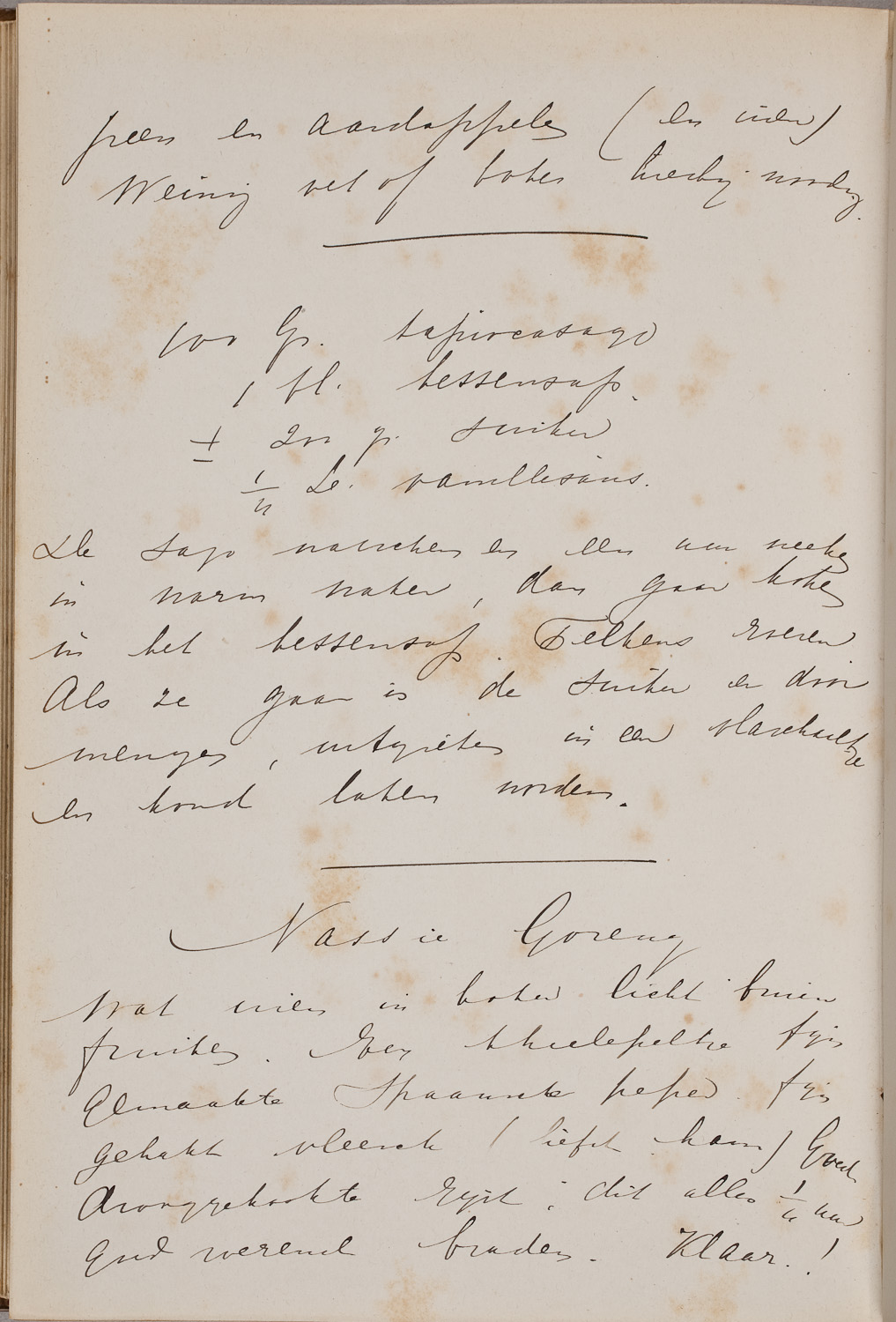
A 19th-century recipe for nasi goreng written in Dutch, from an Album amicorum of the Royal Library of the Netherlands

Nasi goreng was considered as part of the Indies culture during the colonial period. The mention of nasi goreng appears in colonial literature of Dutch East Indies, such as in the Student Hidjo by Marco Kartodikoromo, a serial story published in Sinar Hindia newspaper in 1918. It was mentioned in a 1925 Dutch cookbook Groot Nieuw Volledig Oost Indisch Kookboek. Trade between the Netherlands and the Dutch East Indies during that time has increased the popularity of Indonesian-style nasi goreng to the world.

The colonial period introduced new dynamics to the development of fried rice in Southeast Asia. European powers such as the Portuguese, Dutch and British dominated spice and commodity trade in the region, indirectly influencing local cuisines. Fried rice itself, however, remained primarily a Chinese culinary tradition. The wider circulation of seasonings such as soy sauce, chilli, pepper and nutmeg helped shape regional adaptations, particularly nasi goreng.

In the Dutch East Indies, recipes for nasi goreng appeared in late 19th- and early 20th-century cookbooks compiled for European households, while in British Malaya and the Straits Settlements, similar preparations were noted across Malay, Chinese and Indian Muslim communities. Despite these colonial-era records, fried rice continued to be prepared in domestic kitchens, sold by street vendors and consumed across social classes, underscoring its role as an integral part of local food culture.

During this period, nasi goreng also spread beyond Southeast Asia with colonial migration and trade, introduced to Sri Lanka by the Sri Lankan Malay community, to the Netherlands by Indo-Dutch migrants and to Suriname by Javanese-Surinamese settlers, where it became incorporated into local culinary traditions.

=== Modern developments ===
During the 20th century, nasi goreng expanded beyond its role as a household and street food to become one of the most recognisable dishes of Maritime Southeast Asia. Across the region it developed numerous distinctive variants: in Indonesia and Malaysia it was promoted as a national dish with countless local styles; in Singapore it entered hawker culture, shaped by Malay, Indian Muslim and Chinese influences; while in Brunei and southern Thailand it was prepared with regional ingredients such as seafood, sambal belacan and local chilli pastes.

As global interest in Asian cuisines grew in the early 21st century, nasi goreng emerged in food surveys and culinary publications as a prominent regional dish. It has also been featured in tourism promotion by Indonesia, Malaysia and Singapore, where it is presented as part of national food heritage. Beyond its regional diversity, nasi goreng has come to be regarded as one of the defining rice dishes of Southeast Asia.

== Culinary profile ==
Nasi goreng is distinguished from other Asian fried rice recipes by its aromatic, earthy and smoky flavour. Nasi goreng is traditionally served at home for breakfast and it is traditionally made out of leftover rice from the night before. The texture of leftover cooked rice is considered more suitable for nasi goreng than that of freshly cooked rice which may be too moist and soft to withstand frying in a wok.

Other than cooked rice, nasi goreng consists of at least three components; ingredients (e.g. egg, shrimp, meat, cooking oil), bumbu spice or seasoning (e.g. garlic, shallot, salt, chili pepper) and condiments (e.g. bawang goreng, krupuk, acar pickles, slices of fresh cucumber and tomato). The combination of spices and ingredients in different ratios allows for the creation of a myriad of flavours.

=== Spice and seasonings ===
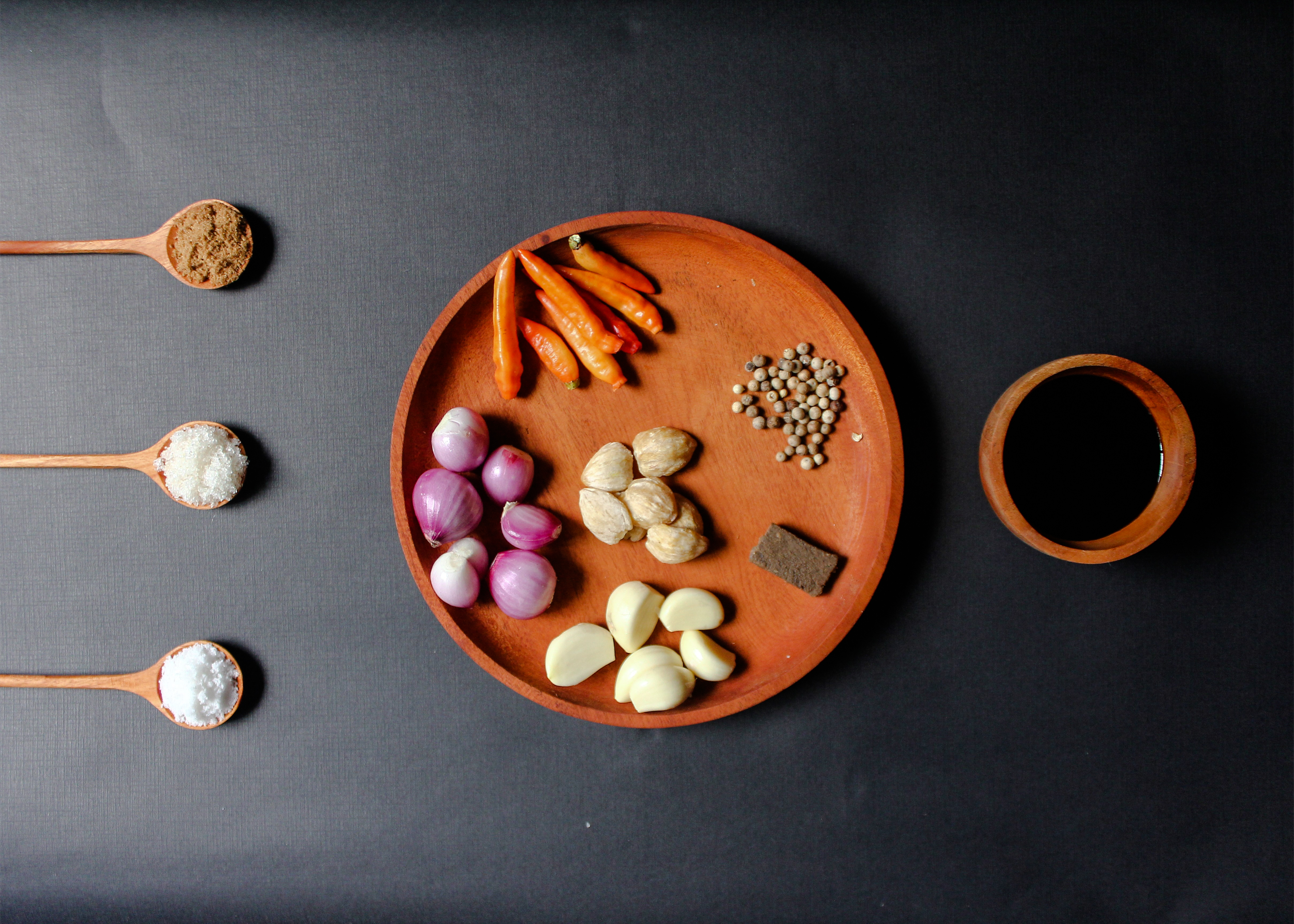
Spice and seasonings for Javanese nasi goreng, including pepper, sugar, salt, bird's eye chili, shallot, garlic, candlenut, shrimp paste and sweet soy sauce

Typical seasonings for nasi goreng include but are not limited to salt, chilli pepper, spring onions, turmeric, palm sugar, bumbu paste made from ground garlic and onion or shallot, kecap manis (sweet soy sauce), shrimp paste, black pepper, fish sauce, powdered broth and so on. Eggs may be scrambled into the rice during the cooking process, or served as accompaniments in the form of sunny side up eggs, omelettes and boiled eggs. Scraps of leftovers from a prepared dish, perhaps chicken or beef pieces, may also be used.

=== Condiments ===
Nasi goreng often adds condiments or garnishes as add-ons. Fried shallot and traditional crackers are often sprinkled upon to give crispy texture, slices of cucumber and tomato for garnishing and to give freshness in an otherwise oily dish, a fried egg is often placed on top of the dish to add savouriness, while chili paste is to add the zesty spiciness according to one's preference. Some common condiments are:

- Bawang goreng: Deep-fried shallots, sprinkled upon nasi goreng
- Kerupuk: various types of crackers, usually emping or prawn crackers
- Acar: pickles made from vinegar preserved cucumber, shallots, carrot and small chilli peppers.
- Telur: egg; can be cooked in many ways and placed on the nasi goreng, usually sunny-side up fried or omelette.
- Sambal: chilli sauce.

== By country ==
=== Variations ===
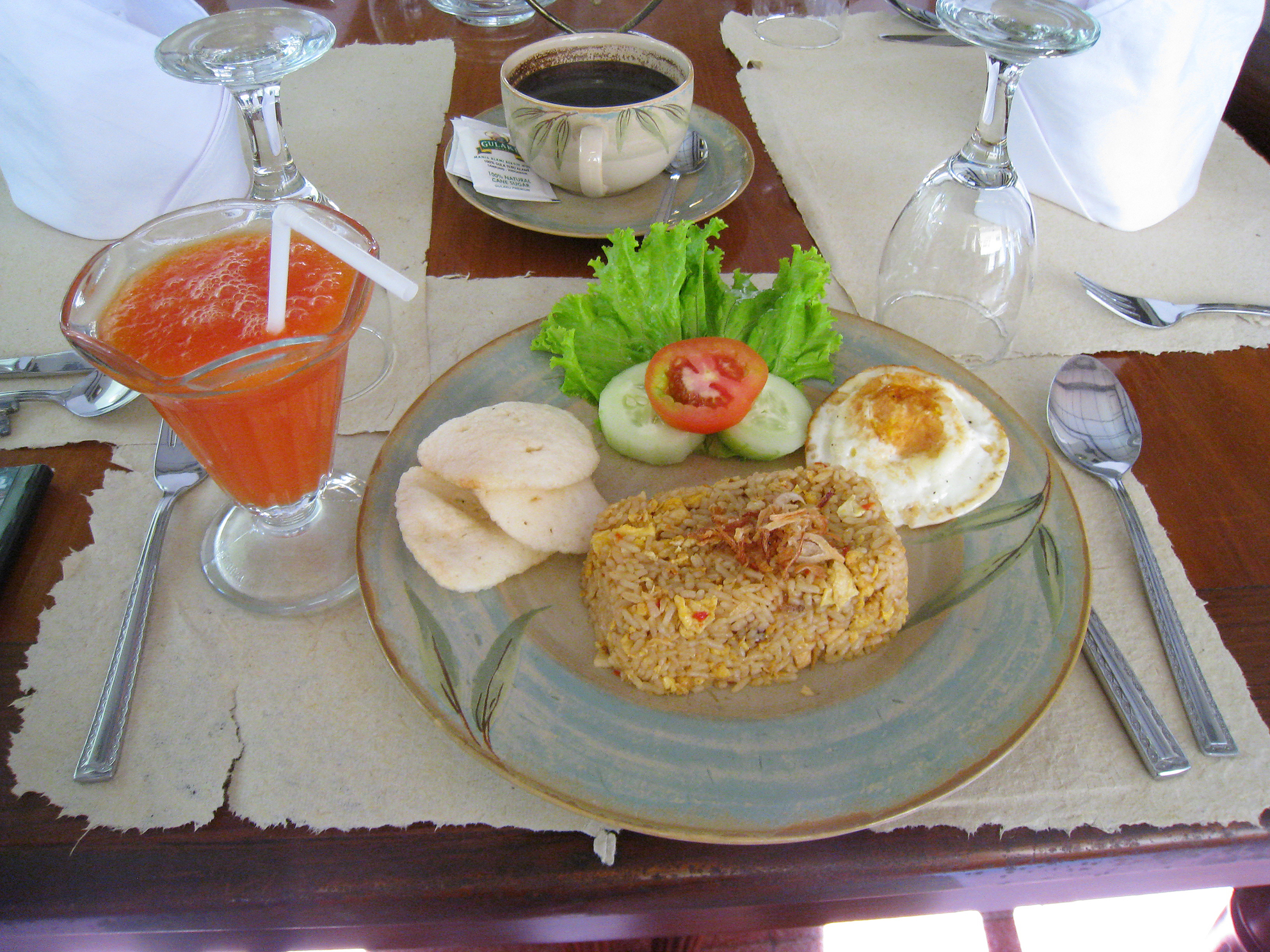
Nasi goreng breakfast in a hotel in Solo, Central Java, with papaya juice and Java black coffee.

There is no single defined recipe for nasi goreng, as every fried rice dish with certain mixtures, additions, ingredients and toppings could lead to another recipe of nasi goreng. There is an innumerable variety of fried rice recipes described as nasi goreng in the nations of Brunei, Indonesia, Malaysia and Singapore. While many versions are perceived as regionally specific, some recipes share common elements that transcends regional and national boundaries: examples include the use of the term kampung ("village" in Indonesian and Malay), shrimp paste (terasi in Indonesian, belacan in Malay), chilli-based sambal relishes, salted fish and the technique of wrapping fried rice in an omelette.

=== Indonesia ===
According to Dwi Larasatie, an Indonesian culinary expert from the Gadjah Mada University, there are 104 types of nasi goreng found throughout Indonesia. All of them are different because they have special spices that characterise the region. Of that 104 nasi goreng variants are classified into three groups; nasi goreng whose origins can be clearly known (36 types), then some developed nasi goreng because it cannot be traced to the area of origin (59 types). Java has 20 variants of nasi goreng spread from the west to the east. For example, nasi goreng Betawi, nasi goreng Sunda, nasi goreng Jawa, nasi goreng Semarangan, nasi goreng Jawa Timuran, etc. There are 9 types of nasi goreng whose basic ingredients are not only rice, but also contains additional mixture such as noodles, barley, corn, etc.

In most parts of Indonesia, nasi goreng is cooked with ample amounts of kecap manis (sweet soy sauce) that creates a golden brownish colour and the flavour is mildly sweet. A typical preparation of nasi goreng may involve stir frying rice in a small amount of cooking oil or margarine; seasoned with an ample amount of kecap manis and ground shrimp paste and cooked with other ingredients, particularly eggs and chicken. However, in other places such as Eastern Indonesia (Sulawesi and Maluku), the sweet soy sauce is usually absent and is replaced by bottled tomato and chili sauce, creating reddish-coloured nasi goreng. This variant is called nasi goreng merah (red fried rice) or nasi goreng Makassar after the South Sulawesi capital. Some variants of nasi goreng, such as salted fish or teri Medan (Medan's anchovy) nasi goreng, do not use kecap manis at all, creating a lighter colour similar to Chinese fried rice or Japanese chahan.

This regional diversity is also reflected in the way nasi goreng is named and understood in Indonesia. The term is sometimes applied to fried-rice dishes associated with other culinary traditions. Nasi goreng Hongkong and nasi goreng Tionghoa or nasi goreng China, for example, generally refer to Chinese-style fried rice, while nasi goreng Jepang may refer to Japanese fried-rice dishes such as yakimeshi or chahan.

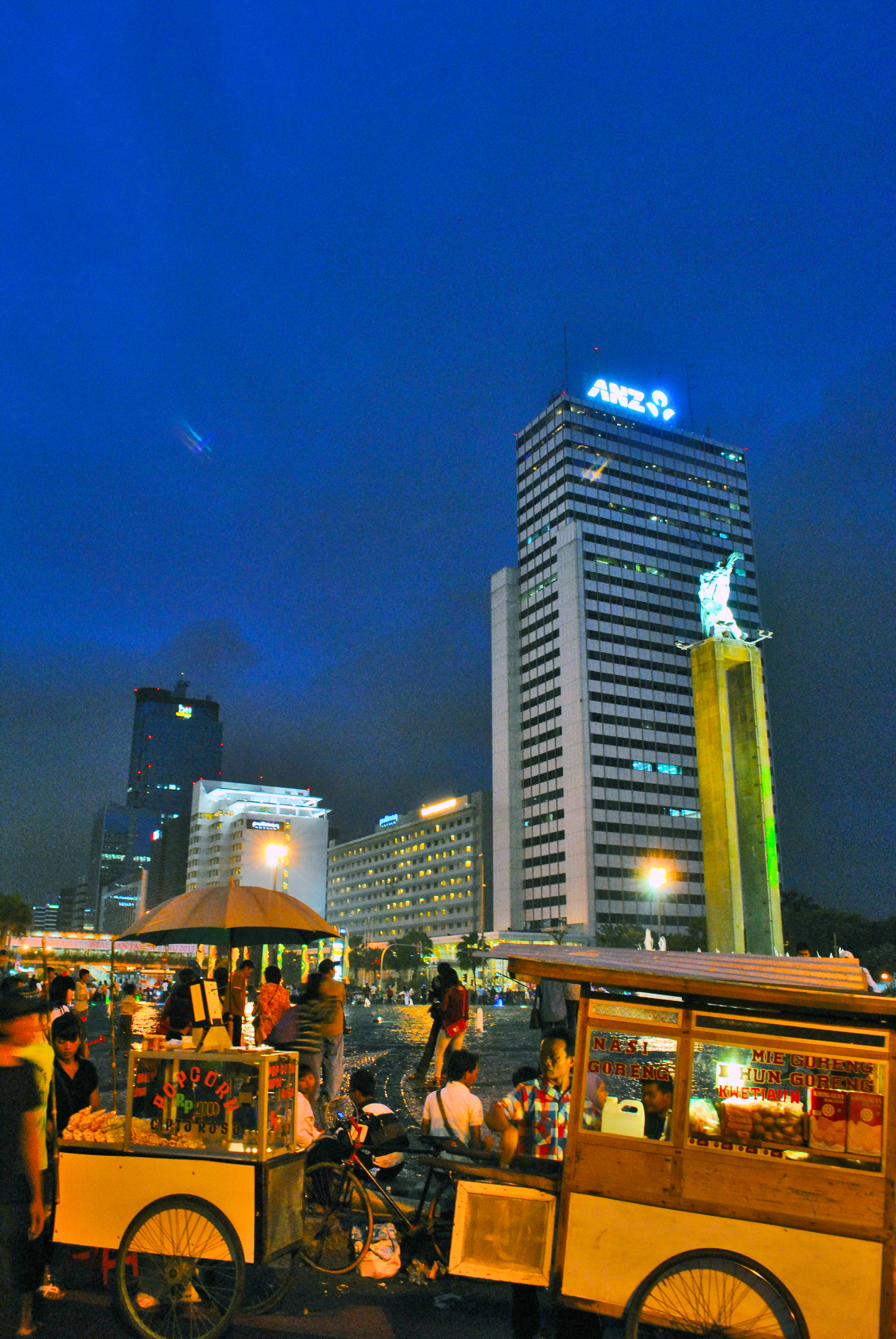
nasi goreng foodcart in Central Jakarta, it has become a popular street food in Indonesia

The dish has also acquired associations with Indonesian history and national identity. During the Indonesian struggle for independence, nasi goreng was served as the sahur meal when Sukarno, Mohammad Hatta and Ahmad Soebardjo drafted the proclamation text, in the early morning before dawn of 17 August 1945, at the residence of a high-ranking Japanese naval officer, Admiral Maeda. At that time, the formulation of the proclamation text coincided with the Muslim fasting month of Ramadan.

After the independence of Indonesia, nasi goreng was popularly considered as a national dish, albeit unofficial. Its simplicity and versatility has contributed to its popularity and made it as a staple among Indonesian households—colloquially considered as the most "democratic" dish since the absence of an exact and rigid recipe has allowed people to do anything they want with it.

Nasi goreng that is commonly consumed daily in Indonesian households were considered as the quintessential dish that represents an Indonesian family. It is in the menu, introduced, offered, and served in Indonesian Theater Restaurant within the Indonesian pavilion at the 1964 New York World's Fair. Howard Palfrey Jones, the US ambassador to Indonesia during the last years of Sukarno's reign in the mid-1960s, in his memoir "Indonesia: The Possible Dream", said that he liked nasi goreng. He described his fondness for nasi goreng cooked by Hartini, one of Sukarno's wives, and praised it as the most delicious nasi goreng he ever tasted.

In 2018, nasi goreng was officially recognized by the Indonesian government as one of the country's national dishes along with four others: soto, sate, rendang, and gado-gado.

The dish has also entered Indonesian political vocabulary. In Indonesian politics parlance, nasi goreng is colloquially known as a dish served for lobbying or diplomacy among Indonesian politicians. Known as diplomasi nasi goreng (nasi goreng diplomacy) or politik nasi goreng (nasi goreng politics), the term was popularised by Megawati Sukarnoputri that entertain Prabowo Subianto and served him nasi goreng back in July 2019. Megawati said: "Fortunately for women politicians, there is a tool to melt men's hearts, which is called "nasi goreng politics", which turns out to be effective", after she met Prabowo.

=== Brunei, Malaysia, Singapore and southern Thailand ===
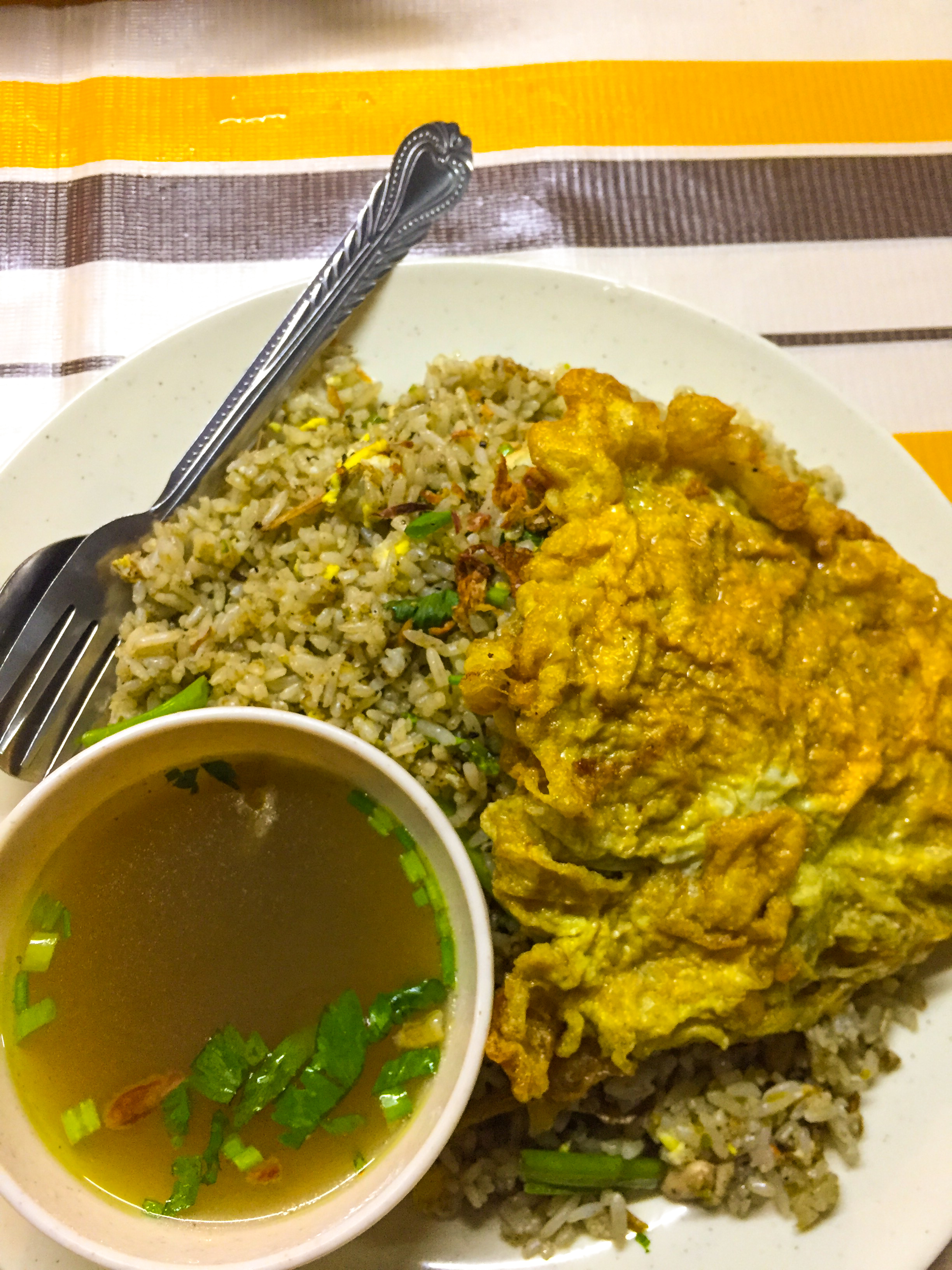
A plate of nasi goreng kampung, one of the popular renditions of nasi goreng in Malaysia

Nasi goreng is firmly embedded in the food cultures of Malaysia, Singapore, Brunei and southern Thailand, where it is sold in roadside stalls, mamak eateries, kopitiams and restaurants, as well as being a common household meal. Preparations typically use pre-cooked rice stir-fried with soy sauce, shallots, garlic and chilli, with additions such as egg, chicken, seafood, or vegetables. The use of belacan (fermented shrimp paste) is a distinctive feature of many regional versions.

A wide range of variants is documented in Malaysia. Nasi goreng kampung, prepared with anchovies and water spinach, and nasi goreng belacan, seasoned with shrimp paste, are longstanding favourites. Other examples include nasi goreng kunyit with turmeric, nasi goreng Pattaya wrapped in an omelette and nasi goreng USA, combining chicken, prawns and squid. Indian Muslim influence is evident in nasi goreng mamak, which incorporates curry spices and differs in seasoning from Malay or Chinese versions.

Across the region, local adaptations reflect the versatility of the dish. Singaporean hawker centres feature sambal-based recipes from Malay vendors, spicier preparations served with fried meats or curries from Indian Muslim stalls and soy-sauce-based styles from Chinese stalls. In Brunei, notable forms include nasi goreng belutak, made with a traditional beef sausage, nasi goreng pulau Brunei (“floating fried rice”) and adaptations using corned beef or seasonal fruits such as buah dabai (Borneo olive). In southern Thailand, particularly in the Malay-speaking provinces of Pattani, Yala and Narathiwat, nasi goreng is integrated into local Malay food traditions, typically prepared with stronger spices and often served with accompaniments such as fried chicken, cucumber or pickled vegetables.

=== Sri Lanka ===
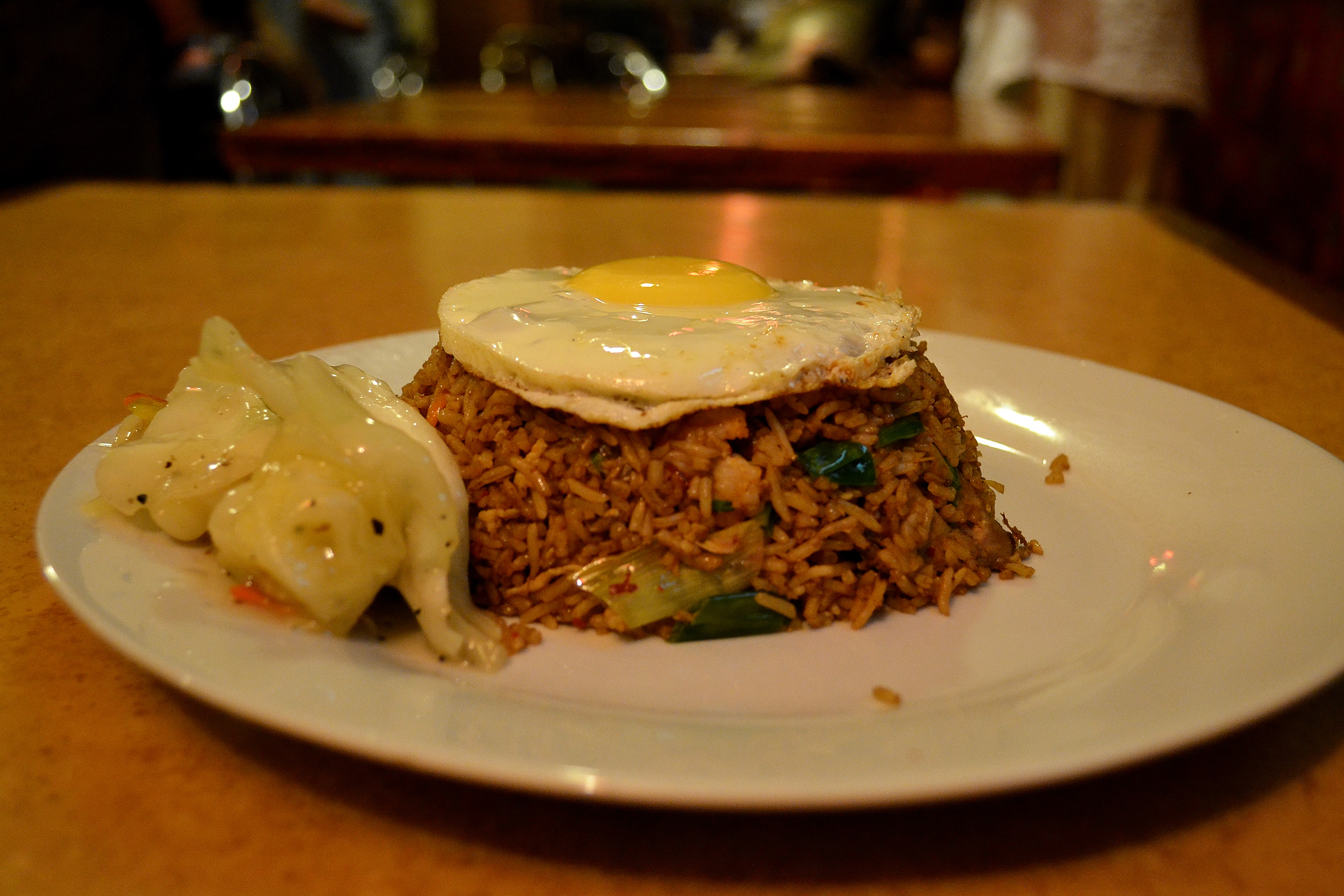
Sri Lankan nasi goreng served with a fried egg

Nasi goreng (Sinhala: නාසි ගොරේන්) is adopted into Sri Lankan cuisine through cultural influences from the Sri Lankan Malays. The preparation of Nasi Goreng typically involves day-old rice sautéed with a mixture of soy sauce and oyster sauce, along with aromatics such as ginger, garlic and shallots. It is commonly enhanced with proteins, including shrimp, chicken, or eggs and may be garnished with fried eggs and fresh vegetables.

=== Suriname ===
Nasi goreng is a popular fried rice dish in Suriname, influenced by Javanese culinary traditions. In Surinamese context, the term "nasi" alone often refers to fried rice dishes, differing from Indonesia, where "nasi goreng" specifically means fried rice.

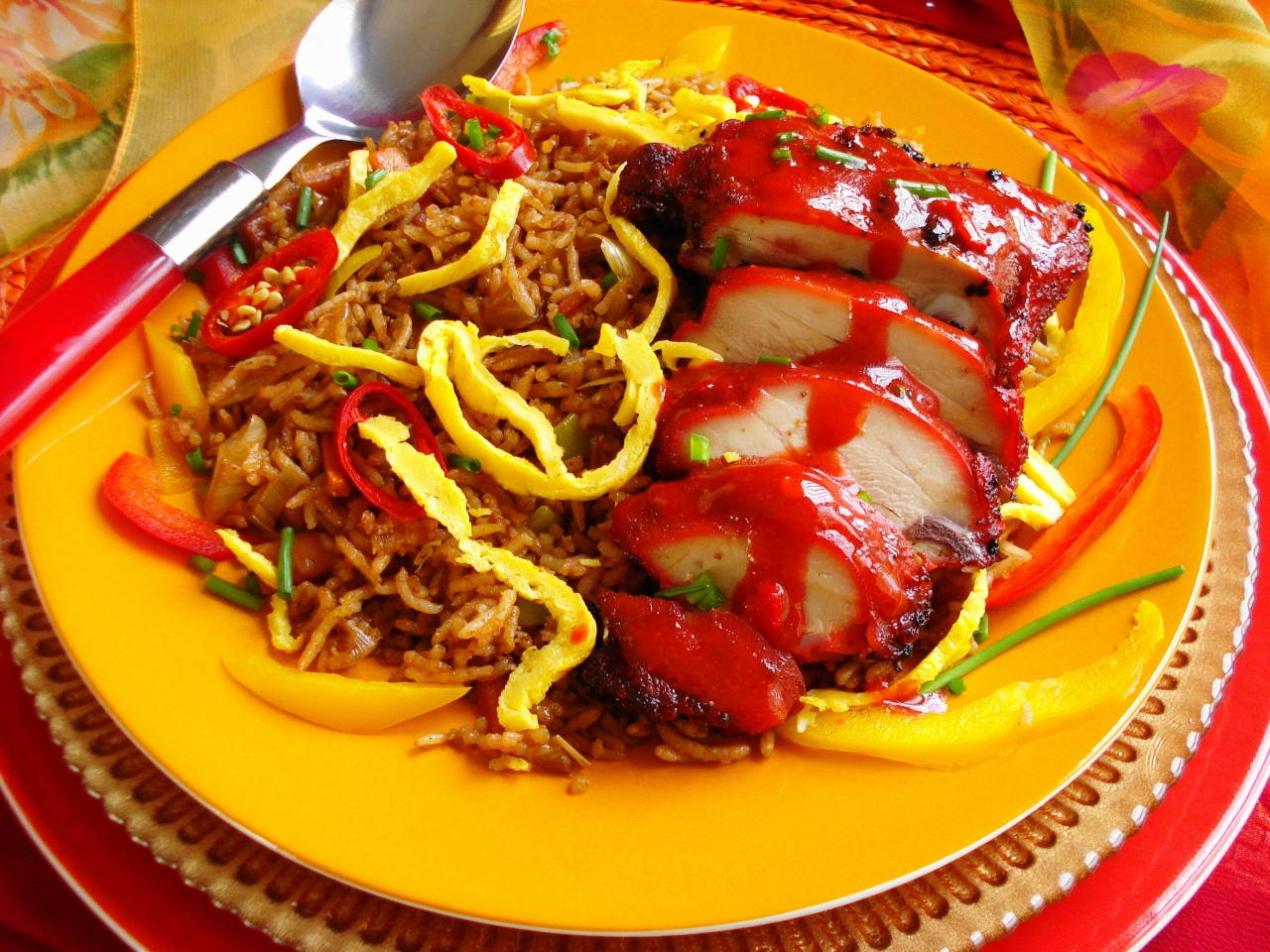
Surinamese nasi

Surinamese nasi is typically served with a mix of meats, such as moksi meti (a combination of roasted meats) or roasted chicken, which originates from Chinese-Surinamese cuisine. It is often garnished with strips of fried egg omelet and accompanied by sides such as atjar (pickled vegetables) and bakabana (fried plantain). Unlike the Indonesian version, where fried rice is commonly cooked together with the meat, in Suriname, the meat is typically prepared separately and added to complement the meal.

The dish exemplifies a fusion of cultural influences resulting from the historical migration of Javanese people to Suriname during the Dutch colonial period, who introduced their culinary traditions. Although originating from Indonesian migrants, the version of nasi goreng in Suriname has evolved over time to incorporate local flavors and variations in herbs and spices. For example, soy sauce is often used to enhance the flavor and color of the rice, although some recipes may replace it with tomato paste. This adaptability in preparation allows for diverse variations that reflect personal or regional preferences.

=== Netherlands ===
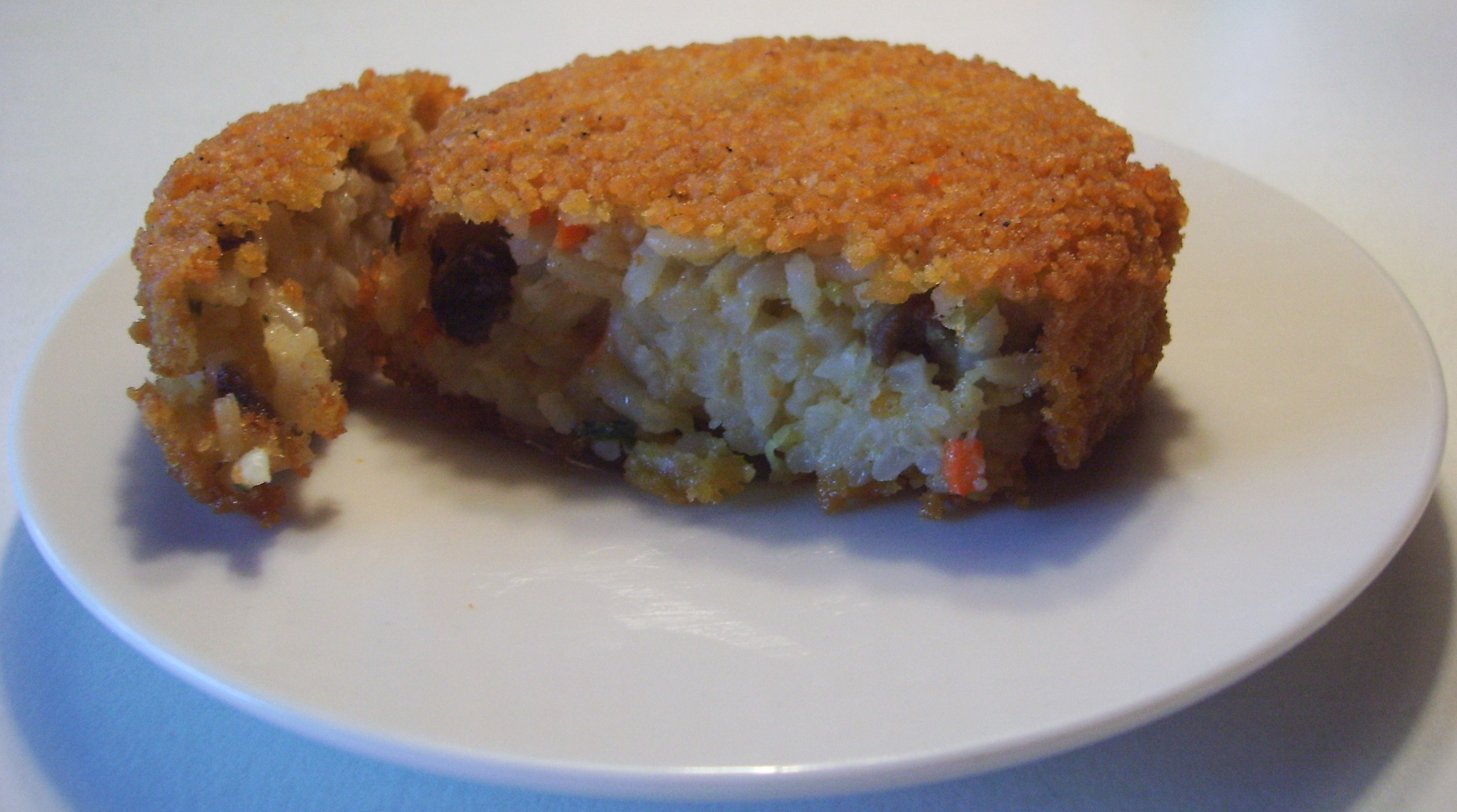
Nasischijf, a popular Dutch snack made from nasi goreng, presented in a croquette-like form.

In the Netherlands, Indonesian cuisine is common due to the historical colonial ties with Indonesia. Indo-Dutch and Indonesians cater Indonesian food both in restaurants and as take-away. Also, take-away versions of nasi goreng are plentiful in toko Asian grocery shop and supermarkets. Supermarkets also commonly carry several brands of spice mix for nasi goreng, along with krupuk and other Indonesian cooking supplies.

Chinese take-aways and restaurants have also adapted nasi goreng, plus a selection of other Indonesian dishes, but spice them Cantonese style. In Flanders, the name nasi goreng is often used for any Asian style of fried rice. Distinctive version of nasi goreng has been developed, such as Javanese-Suriname version of the dish. In the Netherlands, nasi goreng has been developed into a snack called nasischijf (Dutch for "nasi disk"), it is a Dutch deep-fried fast food, consisting of nasi goreng inside a crust of breadcrumbs.

A typical type of nasi goreng, created in the Dutch Indies by Indo-Dutch or Dutch and still eaten in The Netherlands today is made with butter and bacon or other types of pork at its base.

== Availability ==
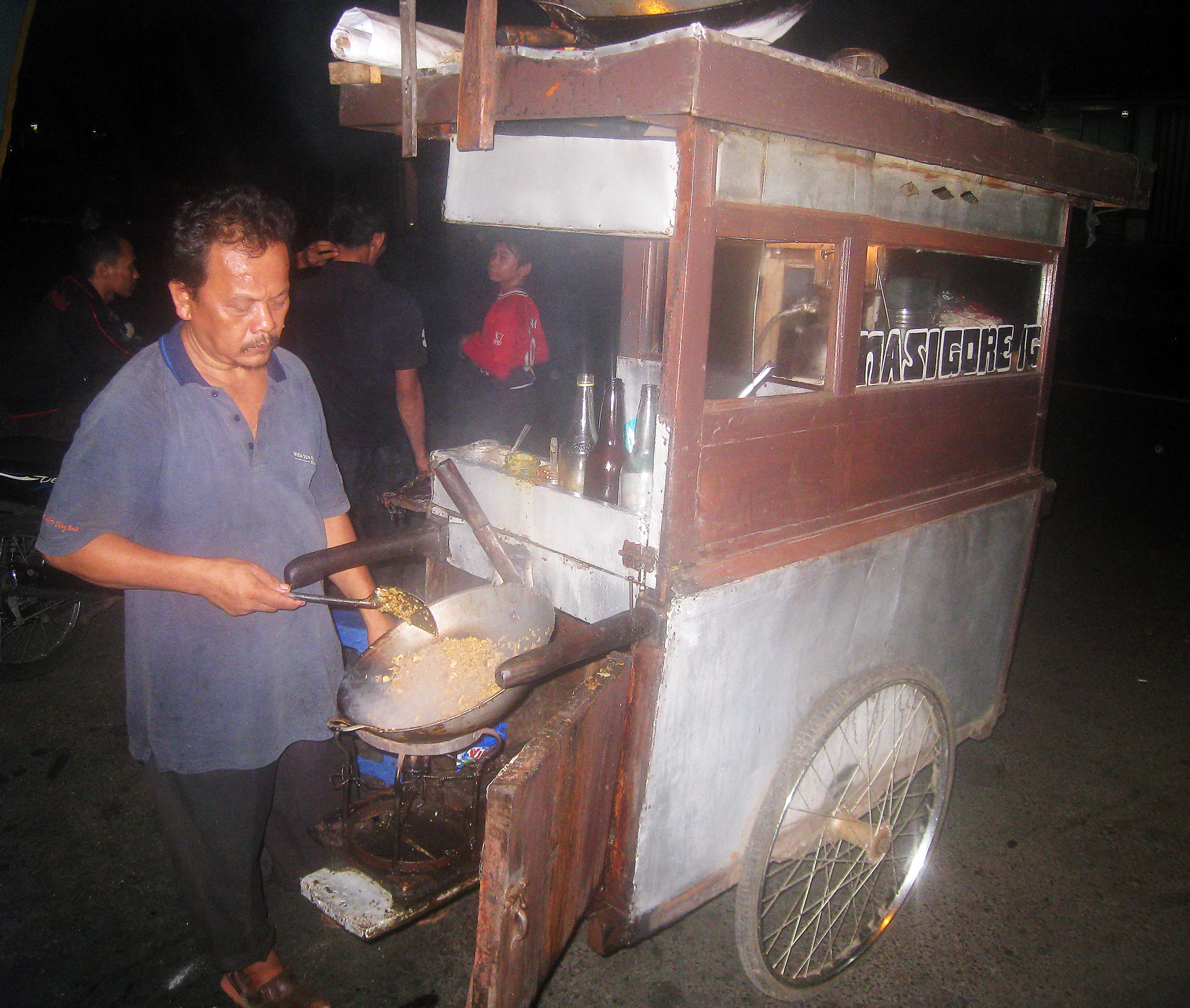
A street vendor cooking nasi goreng in his cart. The travelling night hawkers often frequenting Jakarta residential area.

Nasi goreng can be eaten at any time of day and many Indonesians, Malaysians and Singaporeans eat nasi goreng for breakfast whether at home or at dining establishments. As a main meal, nasi goreng may be accompanied by additional items such as a fried egg, ayam goreng (fried chicken), satay, vegetables, seafood dishes such as fried shrimp or fish and kerupuk crackers.

=== Street food ===
Nasi goreng is a popular staple served by street vendors, in warungs and also by travelling night hawkers that frequent residential neighbourhoods with their wheeled carts. When accompanied by a fried egg, it is sometimes called nasi goreng istimewa (special fried rice). Nasi goreng is usually cooked to order for each serving, since the cook usually asks the client their preference on the degree of spiciness: mild, medium, hot or extra hot. The spiciness corresponds to the amount of sambal or chili pepper paste used. The cook might also ask how the client would like their egg done: mixed into nasi goreng or fried separately as telur mata sapi or ceplok (sunny side up) or as telur dadar (omelette). Nevertheless, some popular nasi goreng warung or food stalls may prepare in bulk due to large demand.

In many warungs (street stalls) in Indonesia, nasi goreng is often sold together with bakmi goreng (fried noodles), kwetiau goreng and mie rebus (noodle soup).

=== Restaurant ===
Nasi goreng is a popular dish in restaurants. In Indonesia there are restaurant chains that specialise at serving nasi goreng.

=== Convenience store ===
Some seasoning brands sold in Indonesian supermarkets offer "bumbu nasi goreng", an instant nasi goreng seasoning paste to be applied upon frying leftover rice. Convenience store outlets in Indonesia also offering prepackage frozen microwave-heated nasi goreng take away.

== In popular culture ==
- Tante Lien's song "Geef Mij Maar Nasi Goreng" (Just Give Me Nasi Goreng), composed and recorded in 1979, illustrates historical culinary ties between the Netherlands and Indonesia, as well as whimsically describing the craving of people of Indo (Eurasian) descent repatriated in the Netherlands for Indonesian cuisine.
- In February 1973 Philip Proctor and Peter Bergman from The Firesign Theatre released their first solo album TV or Not TV on which a character named "Nasi Goreng" sings a song of the same name to introduce himself.
- In 2011, an online poll with participation from 35,000 voters held by CNN International chose Indonesian-style nasi goreng as number two on their 'World's 50 Most Delicious Foods' list after rendang.
- The titular police division in the 2016 Japanese comedy series Tokyo Metropolitan Police Department, Nasi Goreng Division (警視庁 ナシゴレン課, Keishichou Nasi Goreng-ka) is named after the dish.
- During their 2016 concert in Indonesia, the Australian band 5 Seconds of Summer dedicated a song inspired by the dish entitled "Nasi Goreng".

== See also ==
- Fried rice
  - List of fried rice dishes
  - Sinangág
- Cuisine of Brunei
- Cuisine of Indonesia
- Cuisine of Malaysia
- Cuisine of Singapore
- Cuisine of the Netherlands
- Biryani
