= Kamayan =

Filipino term for eating with hands

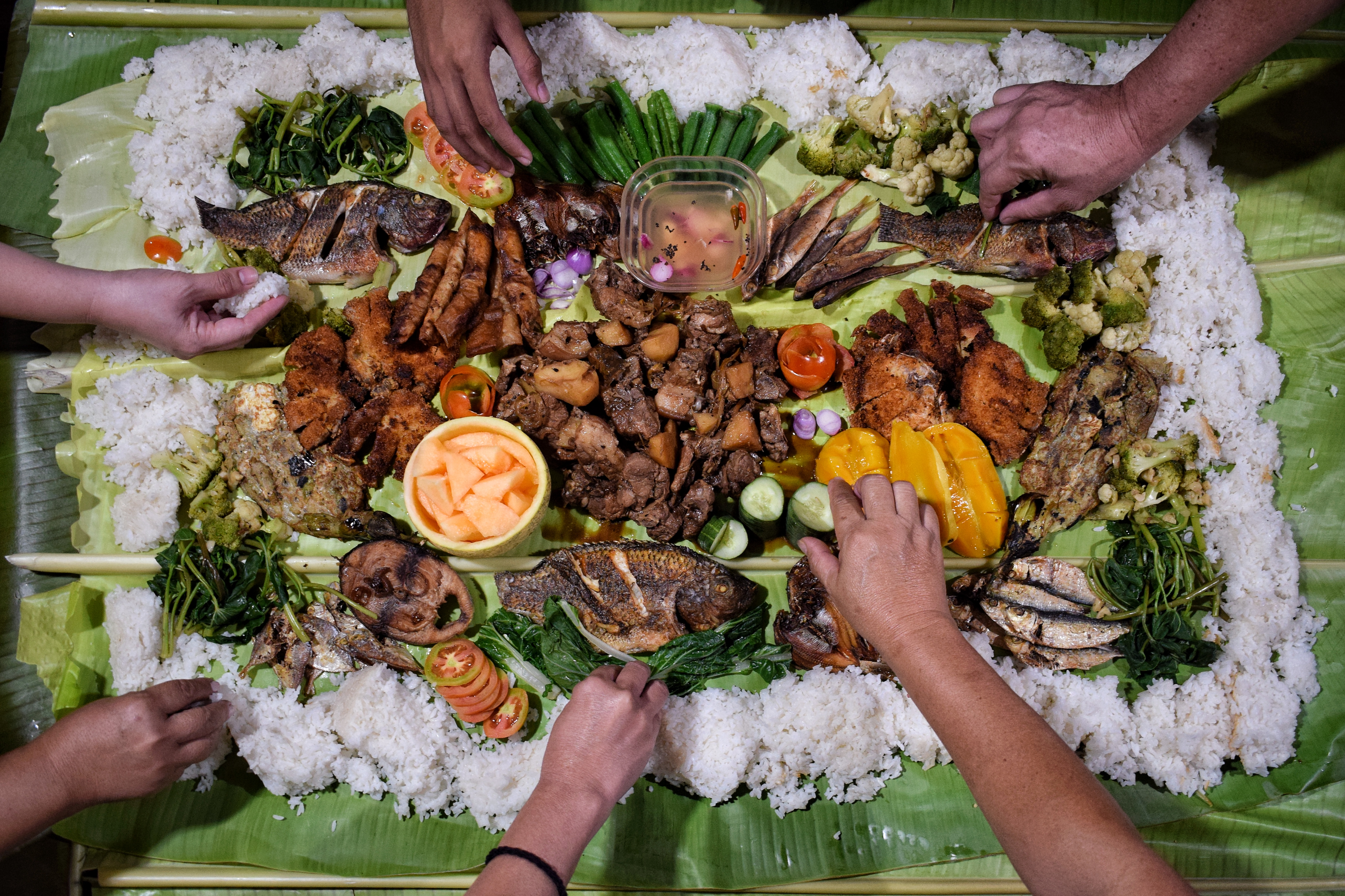
- Kamayan (eating with the hands) as applied through a boodle fight (a separate concept)
- Alternative names: Kinamo, kinamut
- Place of origin: Philippines

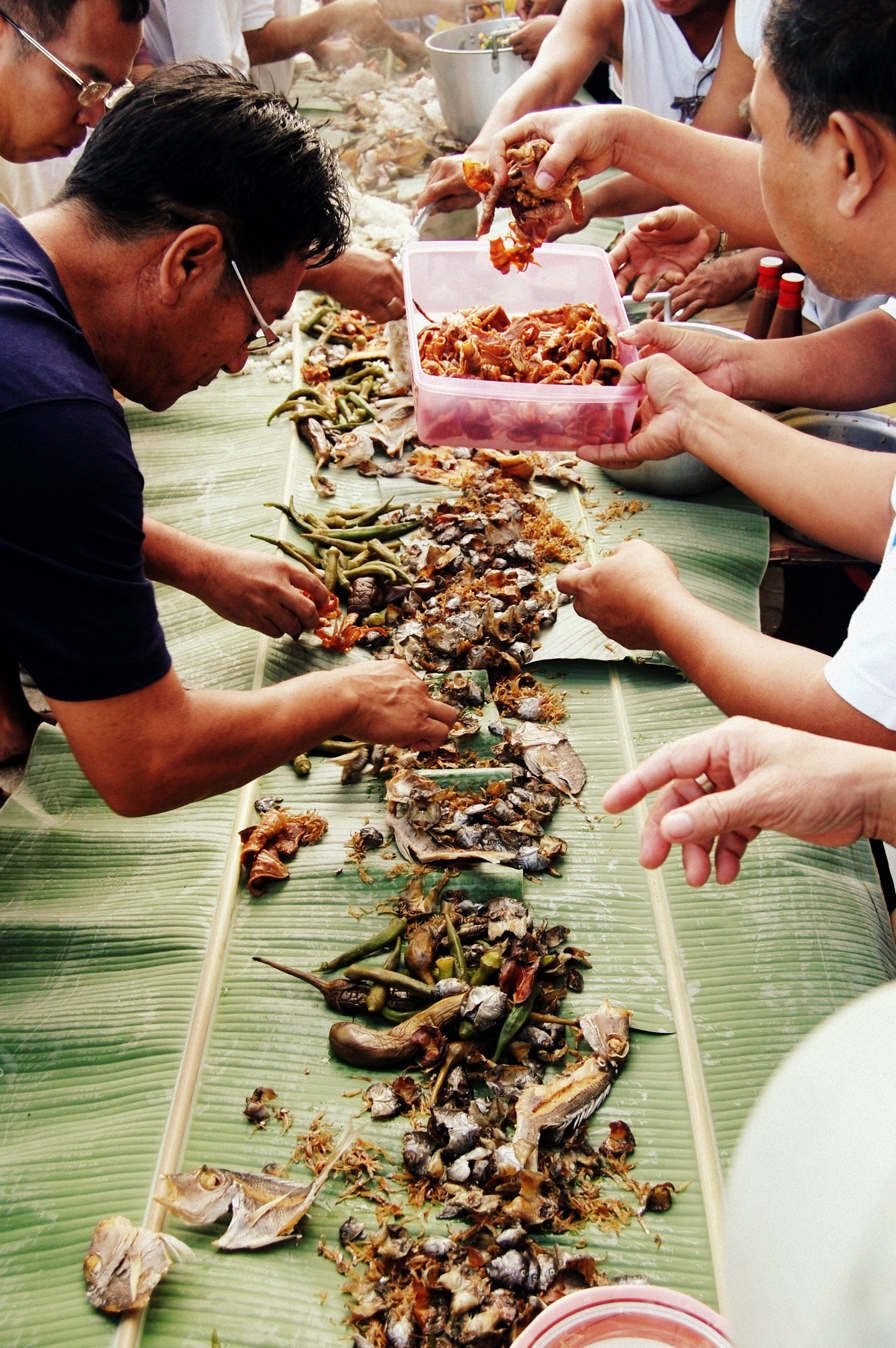
A beach boodle fight in Baler, Aurora.

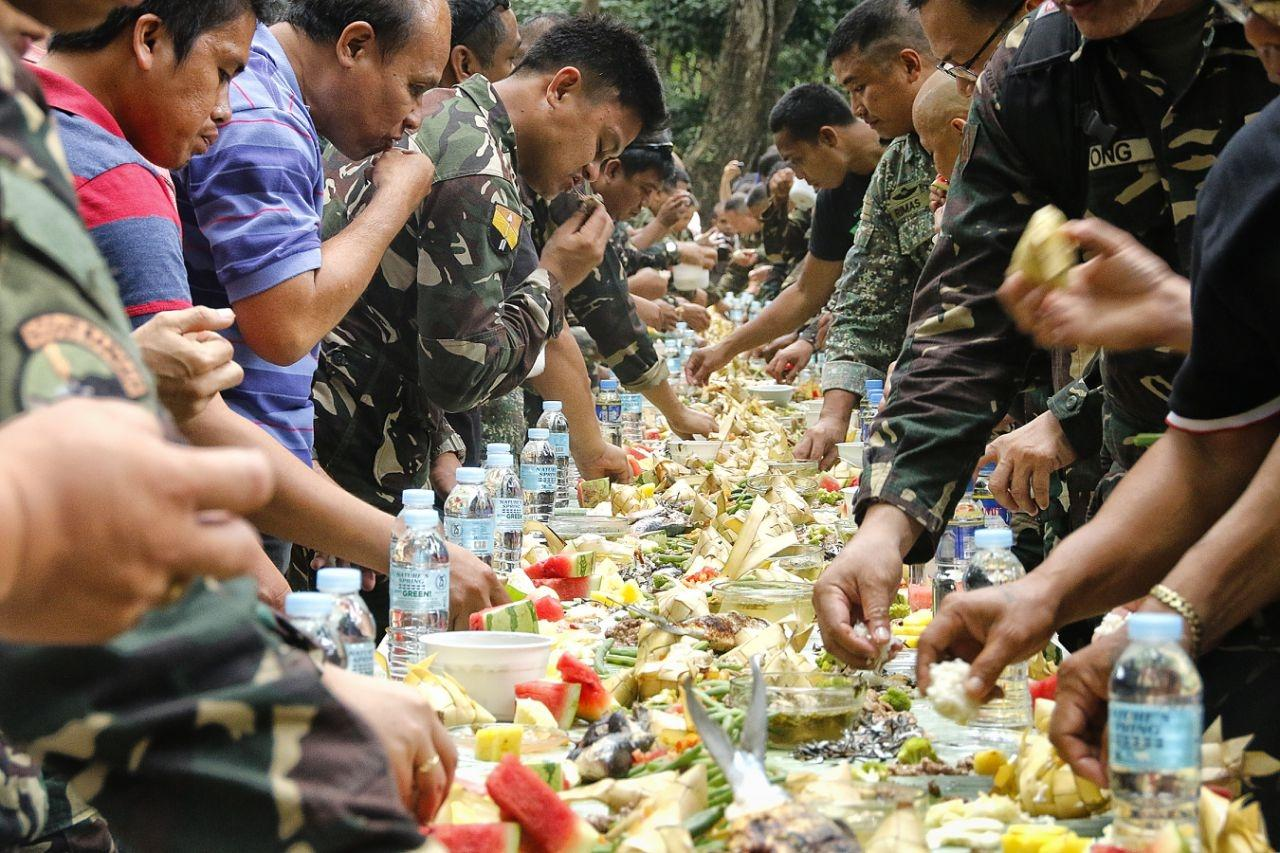
Men of the 2nd Mechanized Infantry Brigade of the Philippine Army are joined by civilians in a boodle fight.

Kamayan is a Filipino cultural term for the various occasions or contexts in which pagkakamay (Tagalog: "[eating] with the hands") is practiced. Eating with hands is also known as kinamot or kinamut in Visayan languages.

While eating with the hands started out as a common practice before the arrival of European colonizers, its cultural significance has become elevated in the Philippines' postcolonial culture, since the practice had been discouraged by the Philippines' Spanish and American colonizers who instead encouraged the use of spoons and forks.

While kamayan or pagkakamay can be an ordinary everyday activity for many in their own homes, it may also be part of communal feasting (called salu-salo in Tagalog). Such feasts traditionally served the food on platters laid on large leaves, such as banana or breadfruit, spread on a table, with the diners eating with their hands from their own plates.

A separate tradition which involves the food being served directly on large leaves spread on a table and the diners eating with the hands without plates or utensils straight off the leaves and sitting or (more authentically) standing side by side is the boodle fight, a tradition of the Armed Forces of the Philippines originally practiced by Philippine Military Academy cadets, and named for military slang from the United States Military Academy West Point. The intent is to build military camaraderie by getting military personnel to enjoy the same food together, regardless of rank.

Among restaurants both inside and outside of the Philippines, the concept of "boodle fight" has often been erroneously conflated with kamayan and salu-salo, and the latter terms tend to be wrongly used synonymously when marketing the Filipino food experience. In commercial contexts, the term "Kamayan feasts" tends to be used for boodle fights in practice. While all boodle fights are kamayan, not all kamayan are boodle fights, and not all salu-salo feasts are kamayan.

== Etymology ==
The Tagalog term kamayan is formed from the root word kamay and the noun-forming suffix "-an" which indicates "collectivity, object, place, and instrument." Both pagkakamay and kinamot mean "[eating] with the hands", from the root words kamay and kamot, both meaning "hands".

Meanwhile, salu-salo means "feast" or "banquet", a reduplication of salo, "to eat together" or "to share food".

== Kamayan and salu-salo ==
Traditional salu-salo communal feasts, which embrace the traditional use of banana leaves on tables wherein rice and various dishes are placed (often on platters or bowls), may also be traditionally eaten kamayan, with one's hands, from individual plates. Generally, only dry foods paired with rice are served; soups, stews and saucy foods are not practical to eat without utensils or bowls, so salu-salo occasions are not necessarily kamayan. When banana leaves are used to cover the table, they are washed and slightly wilted over open flames to bring out an oily sheen before they are laid out. In the Batanes Islands in the northern Philippines, large breadfruit (tipuho) leaves are used instead in a serving tradition called vunung or vunong.

== Method of pagkakamay ==
Pagkakamay describes the act of eating with the bare hands, which is the traditional pre-colonial method of eating in Filipino culture. This is done by forming a small mound of rice, adding a piece of the accompanying dish for flavor (the ulam), compressing it into a small pyramid with the fingers, lifting it to the mouth nestled in four cupped fingers, and then pushing it into the mouth with the thumb. The entire process only uses the fingers of one hand. It never uses the palms of the hands and the fingers also never enter the mouth. The other hand is not used and may instead be used to hold the plate or a drink.

== Social significance ==
As in other countries, eating with the hands is an informal and intimate method of dining. It does not have the strict etiquette and rules of western dining with utensils. Eating with the hands may be done in private family meals, or at gatherings, parties, picnics, or fiestas.

== History ==
The practice of eating with hands is pre-colonial. It has been described by Antonio Pigafetta in the Magellan expedition, as well as by Spanish missionaries during the Spanish colonial period. While utensils like wooden spoons and ladles existed for serving and cooking in pre-colonial Filipino culture, they were not used for eating.

The practice was tolerated during the Spanish period, but it was suppressed during the American colonial period when American dining etiquette and the use of spoons and forks were aggressively promoted.

Eating with hands became a particularly popular way of celebrating Filipino culture in the 1980s and 1990s, a fact reflected in the ubiquitous popularity of an upscale restaurant chain called "Kamayan". This and other copycat restaurants offered socially acceptable outlets for eating with the hands when dining out, and offered either dining from individual plates or the fully communal boodle fight experience or both, but the terms kamayan' and salu-salo began to be conflated with each other and with "boodle fight", which eventually spread to the Filipino diaspora.

=== Boodle fight ===
A boodle fight is a meal that dispenses with cutlery and dishes. Diners instead eat with their hands straight off the table or leaves on the table where the food is spread, unlike typical kamayan instances of eating with the hands off individual plates regardless of how the food is placed on the table. The food is placed on top of a long banana leaf-lined trestle table and diners do not sit in chairs but stand shoulder to shoulder in a line on both sides of the table.

A senior officer or enlisted personnel then utters the traditional command for the boodle fight to begin:

"Ready on the left,
Ready on the right,
Commence boodle fight!"

The term "boodle" was originally American military slang at West Point for contraband sweets such as cake, candy and ice cream. A "boodle fight" originally only meant a party in which boodle fare is served. Cadets would compete with their fellows to grab as much ice cream, cake and other boodle fare as they could before it ran out. With the American colonization of the Philippines, the term "boodle" was carried over to the communal meals the Philippine armed forces ate in training and in the field, often off leaves and by hand due to necessity due to lack of utensils and plates.

A growing number of Filipino restaurants are serving meals boodle fight-style. In commercial contexts, the dishes in a boodle fight are arranged equidistantly throughout the table to ensure everyone has equal access. Rice is typically plain steamed white rice, sinangag (garlic rice), or rice cooked in coconut leaves (puso). Typical dishes aside from rice tend to be dry, and include inihaw (barbecues, including lechon, whole roasted pork), lumpia, fried meats (like crispy pata), tocino (cured pork), tapa, longganisa (sausages), boiled eggs or salted eggs, seafood, dried fish, and blanched, fresh, or stir-fried vegetables. These are provided with a variety of sawsawan (dipping sauces), calamansi, bagoong, as well as pickled vegetables (atchara). Desserts are also included, like ripe or unripe Philippine mangoes, pineapples, watermelons, papaya, young coconut, and various kakanin (rice cakes). Drinks are usually fruit juices, beer, wine, or softdrinks. As a rule, foods that are less practical for eating with hands, like soups, stews, saucy dishes, pancit noodles and syrupy desserts like leche flan are not included.

In contrast to commercial boodle fights, true military boodle fights remain regimented affairs. While the soldiers may eat together regardless of rank, rank does not disappear. The food is often utilitarian and not festive, and they have a strict time limit to consume the food.

In 2000, during the Philippine government's all-out war approach against the Moro Islamic Liberation Front, then-President Joseph Estrada held and participated in boodle fights for government troops after the Battle of Camp Abubakar. Estrada and the soldiers feasted on truckloads of lechon and beer right in the captured camp. Since pork and alcohol are haram, this provoked the Muslim extremists further and garnered criticisms of insensitivity to Muslim Filipinos in general.

== See also ==
- Banana leaf
- Military tradition
