= Morisqueta tostada =

Filipino fried rice dish

- Alternative names: Morisqueta Filipina, Morisqueta frita, Morisketa tostada, Murisketa tustada
- Course: Main course (breakfast)
- Place of origin: Philippines
- Created by: Filipino cuisine
- Main ingredients: Fried rice, sausage, ham, shrimp
- Similar dishes: Sinangag

Morisqueta tostada is a Filipino fried rice dish characterized by the addition of sausage (chorizo de bilbao, chorizo de macao, or Chinese sausage), ham, shrimp, and spring onions. The name is Chavacano and Philippine Spanish for "toasted boiled rice." It is a very old dish adapted from Chinese fried rice with influences from Spanish cuisine by Chinese Filipino immigrants in the Spanish colonial era of the Philippines. It is sometimes differentiated as "Spanish-style fried rice". It is usually served in Chinese Filipino restaurants in major Spanish-era cities like Manila, Cebu, Zamboanga, and Iloilo. It is commonly eaten for breakfast with fried dishes like longganisa, tapa, or carne norte guisado.

== See also ==
- Paelya
- Kiampong
- Sinangag
- Aligue fried rice
- Bagoong fried rice
- Kuning
- List of fried rice dishes
- List of garlic dishes
- Sinigapuna
