= Shrimp paste fried rice =

Shrimp paste fried rice can refer to:

- Bagoong fried rice, shrimp paste fried rice in Filipino cuisine
- Khao khluk kapi (ข้าวคลุกกะปิ), shrimp paste fried rice in Thai cuisine
