= Bagoong fried rice =

Filipino fried rice dish

- Alternative names: Binagoongan fried rice, bagoong rice
- Course: Main course
- Place of origin: Philippines
- Created by: Filipino cuisine
- Main ingredients: Fried rice in oil with bagoong alamang (shrimp paste), garlic, spring onions, black pepper, and salt

Bagoong fried rice, also known as binagoongan fried rice or anglicized as shrimp paste fried rice, is a Filipino fried rice dish cooked by stir-frying pre-cooked rice with sauteed bagoong alamang (shrimp paste), toasted garlic, spring onions, shallots, julienned sour green mangoes (which balances the saltiness of the shrimp paste), and optionally other ingredients like chilis, cucumbers, jicamas, carrots, scrambled eggs, chicharon, and tomatoes. It is usually light pink in color due to the use of angkak (red yeast rice) coloring agent from the bagoong. It is eaten paired with meat and seafood dishes, or is cooked with chunks of meat and seafood and eaten as is.

It is a variant of sinangag (garlic fried rice) and is similar to aligue fried rice, which uses taba ng talangka (crab fat paste). It is comparable to the Thai Khao khluk kapi which also uses shrimp paste, but with different cooking and ingredient preparations and methods.

== See also ==
- Morisqueta tostada
- Sinangag
- Kiampong
- Kuning
- Sinigapuna
- Khao khluk kapi
