= Silog =

Class of Filipino breakfast dishes

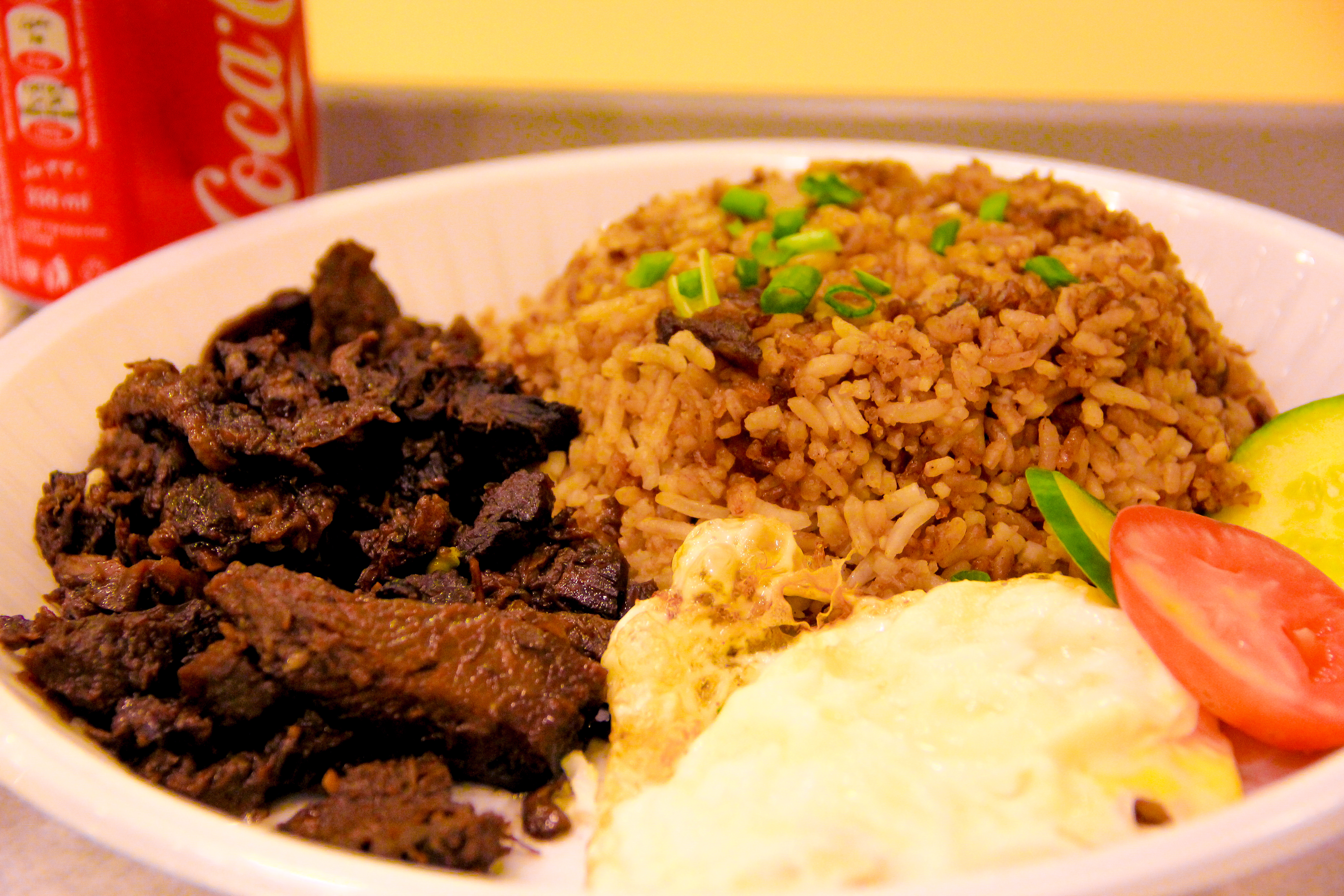
- Tapsilog, a type of silog with Tapa
- Type: Breakfast dish
- Place of origin: Philippines
- Main ingredients: Meat, rice, and egg

Silog is a class of Filipino breakfast dishes containing sinangag (garlic fried rice) and itlog ("egg"; in context, fried egg "sunny side up"). They are served with various accompanying savory dishes (ulam), usually fried meat dishes such as tapa, longganisa or ham. The name of the accompanying dish determines the portmanteau name of the silog; for example, the former three would be known as tapsilog, longsilog, and hamsilog.

== History ==
The first type of silog to be named as such was the tapsilog. It was originally intended to be quick breakfast or late-night hangover fare. It developed from tapsi, which referred to meals of beef tapa and sinangag with no fried egg explicitly mentioned, and diners which mainly or exclusively served such meals were called tapahan or tapsihan in Filipino. The term tapsilog was originally established in the 1980s and came from the Tapsi ni Vivian ("Vivian's Tapsi") restaurant in Marikina. According to Vivian del Rosario, owner of Tapsi ni Vivian, she was the first to use the term tapsilog.

Due to the popularity of this type of cuisine in the Philippines, some restaurants, fast food chains such as Jollibee and McDonald's Philippines and even hotels have included silogs on their breakfast menus, and some restaurants and fast food chains like Tapa King and Rufo's Famous Tapa exclusively or mainly serve this type of dish. Some diners like the first Tapsi ni Vivian in Marikina and Rodic's Diner in the University of the Philippines Diliman campus in Quezon City have also opened other branches after becoming recognized for their silog dishes.

== Types of silog ==
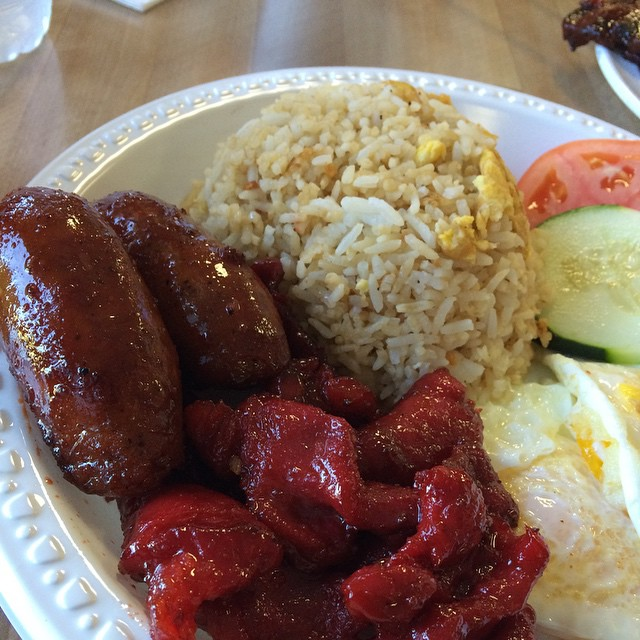
Toci-longsilog, a silog with tocino and longganisa

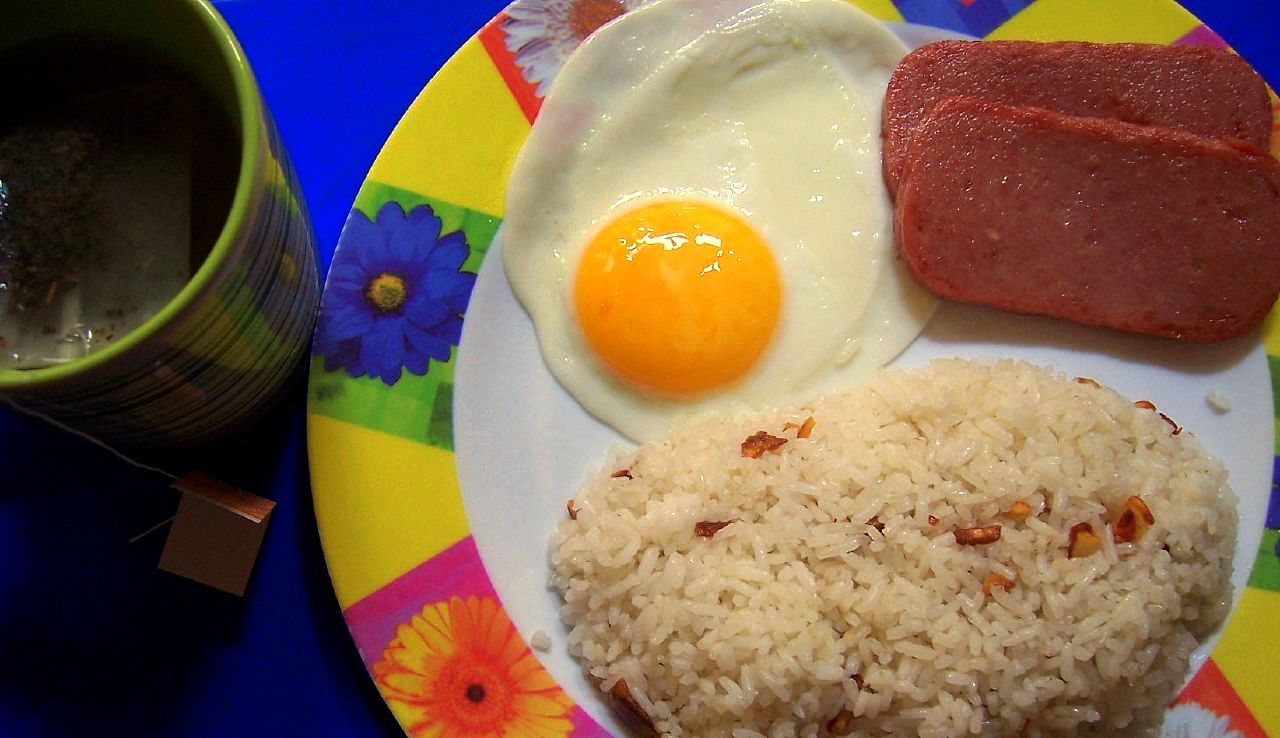
Spamsilog, a type of silog with Spam

Following the development of tapsilog, many other types of silog have been created, all based around garlic-fried rice and fried egg, and suffixed with -silog. Due to the malleable nature of the dish, basically anything can be silog if served with fried rice and fried egg. Abbreviated examples (in alphabetical order) commonly seen in silog eateries and restaurants include:

- Adosilog – adobo, fried rice and fried egg.
- Bacsilog or baconsilog – bacon, fried rice and fried egg.
- Bisteksilog – beef steak, fried rice and fried egg.
- Chosilog – chorizo, fried rice and fried egg.
- Cornsilog – corned beef, fried rice and fried egg.
- Chicksilog or noksilog – fried chicken (piniritong manok or pritong manok), fried rice and fried egg.
- Daingsilog – daing na isda (dried fish), fried rice and fried egg.
  - Bangsilog – dried (daing), marinated bangus (milkfish), fried rice and fried egg.
  - Dangsilog – daing na danggit (dried rabbitfish), fried rice and fried egg.
- Hamsilog - ham, fried rice and fried egg.
- Hotsilog or dogsilog – hot dog, fried rice and fried egg.
- Lechsilog or lechonsilog – lechon kawali, fried rice and fried egg. Also spelled litsilog etc. due to the word lechon being adapted to Tagalog as litson.
- Longsilog – longganisa, fried rice and fried egg.
- Masilog or malingsilog - Ma-Ling brand Chinese luncheon meat, fried rice and fried egg.
- Porksilog – pork chop, fried rice and fried egg.
- Sisilog - sisig, fried rice and fried egg.
- Spamsilog – Spam brand luncheon meat, fried rice and fried egg.
- Tapsilog - tapa, fried rice and fried egg
- Tosilog or tocilog – tocino, fried rice and fried egg.

Beef pares, another common Filipino short-order diner dish, may sometimes be known as "paresilog", "paressilog", etc. if served with a fried egg, since both dishes traditionally include fried rice.

There is a similar dish from Malaysia, the nasi lemak, which is served in a variety of manners using meat, egg and rice with coconut milk.

While a proper silog uses sinangag or fried rice, some diners try to pass the “si” in silog as sinaing or plain boiled rice to cut costs. Some places top the boiled rice with fried garlic flakes and call it “garlic rice”, though true garlic rice is rice stir-fried with garlic. More honest eateries call this “kalog”, taken from kanin, the general term for cooked rice. Some menus even offer “silog” as a standalone option that includes only fried rice and egg. An extra fried egg adds another “log”. A tapsilog with an extra egg becomes “tapsiloglog”, and the pattern can extend without limit.

== See also ==
- Arroz a la cubana
- List of egg dishes
- List of rice dishes
- Loco moco
