= List of Jeolla dishes =

This is a list of typical Jeolla Province dishes found in Korean cuisine.

== Main dishes ==
- Jeonju bibimbap (전주비빔밥), literally "mixed rice of Jeonju"
- Kongnamul gukbap (콩나물국밥), soup made with kongnamul (soybean sprouts), rice
- Pimuneojuk (피문어죽)
- Kkaejuk (깨죽), sesame porridge
- Onuijuk (오누이죽)
- Daechujuk (대추죽), jujube porridge
- Hapjajuk (합자죽)
- Daehapjuk (대합죽)
- Naengguksu (냉국수)
- Godung kalguksu (고둥칼국수)

== Challyu ==
- Meoukkae guk (머우깨국)
- Cheoneotang (천어탕)
- Chueotang (추어탕)
- Juksunjjim (죽순찜)
- Hongeo eosiyuk (홍어어시육)
- Bungeo jorim (붕어조림)
- Myeolchi jaban (멸치자반)
- Duruchigi (두루치기)
- Jangeo gui (장어구이)
- Sutbul bulgogi (숯불불고기)
- Saengchi seopsanjeok (생치섭산적)
- Songi sanjeok (송이산적)
- Sandwaeji gogi gui (산돼지고기구이)
- Aejeo (애저)
- Yukhoe (육회)
- Hongeohoe (홍어회)
- Kkomakhoe (꼬막회)
- Jeotgal (젓갈류), fermented salted seafood

- Gejang, or marinated raw crabs, is a representative speciality of Yeosu.

- Saengsan daegu agamijeot (생산대구아가미젓)

=== Dried fish ===
- Yukpo (육포)
- Eopo (어포(민어포)
  - Daegupo (대구포))

=== Vegetables ===
- Sanchae (산채)
- Gyeoja japchae (겨자잡채)
- Totnamul (톳나물)
- Parae muchim (파래무침)
- Kkolttugi musaengchae (꼴뚜기무생채)
- Gatssamji (갓쌈지)
- Dodeulppaegi kimchi (고들빼기김치)
- Baechupogi kimchi (배추포기김치)
- Geomdeul kimchi (검들김치)
- Gulkkakdugi (굴깍두기)
- Banji (반지(백지))
- Gulbi nojeok (굴비노적)
- Mareunchan (마른찬(짠 반찬)
- Gajuk bugak (가죽부각)
- Bugak (부각)
- Hwangpomuk (황포묵)

== Tteok ==
- Gamsiri tteok (감시리떡), a variety of sirutteok (steamed tteok in a siru pot) made with rice, sugar, azuki bean crumbles, and powdered skins of dried persimmon
- Gamgoji tteok (감고지떡), a variety of sirutteok made with rice, sugar, azuki bean crumbles, and thinly sliced dried persimmon
- Nabokbyeong (나복병) or called musirutteok (무시루떡), a variety of sirutteok made with rice, sugar, azuki bean crumbles, and radish
- Hobak mesiritteok (호박메시리떡)
- Bongnyeong tteok (복령떡)), a variety of sirutteok made with rice, sugar, bongnyeong (Poria cocos)
- Surichwi tteok (수리취떡(수리취개떡)
- Songpi ttteok (송피떡)
- Gochi tteok (고치떡)
- Bibi songpyeon (삐삐(삘기송편)
- Hobakgoji chasirutteok (호박고지차시루떡)
- Gaminjeolmi (감인절미)
- Gamdanja (감단자)
- Jeonju gyeongdan (전주경단)
- Haenam gyeongdan (해남경단)
- Ujjiji (우찌지)
- Chajogi tteok (차조기떡)
- Seopjeon (섭전)

== Desserts ==
- Sanja (산자, 유과)
- Yugwa byeolbeop (유과별법)
- Goguma yeot (고구마엿)
- Donga jeonggwa (동아정과)
- Saenggang jeonggwa (생강정과)
- Yeongeun jeonggwa (연근정과)
- Yuja hwachae (유자화채), hwachae (punch) made with yuzu, Korean pear, pomegranate
- Gotgam sujeonggwa (곶감수정과)

== See also ==
- Korean cuisine
- Korean royal court cuisine
- Korean temple cuisine
- List of Korean dishes
