= Tomalley =

Lobster or crab organs eaten as a delicacy

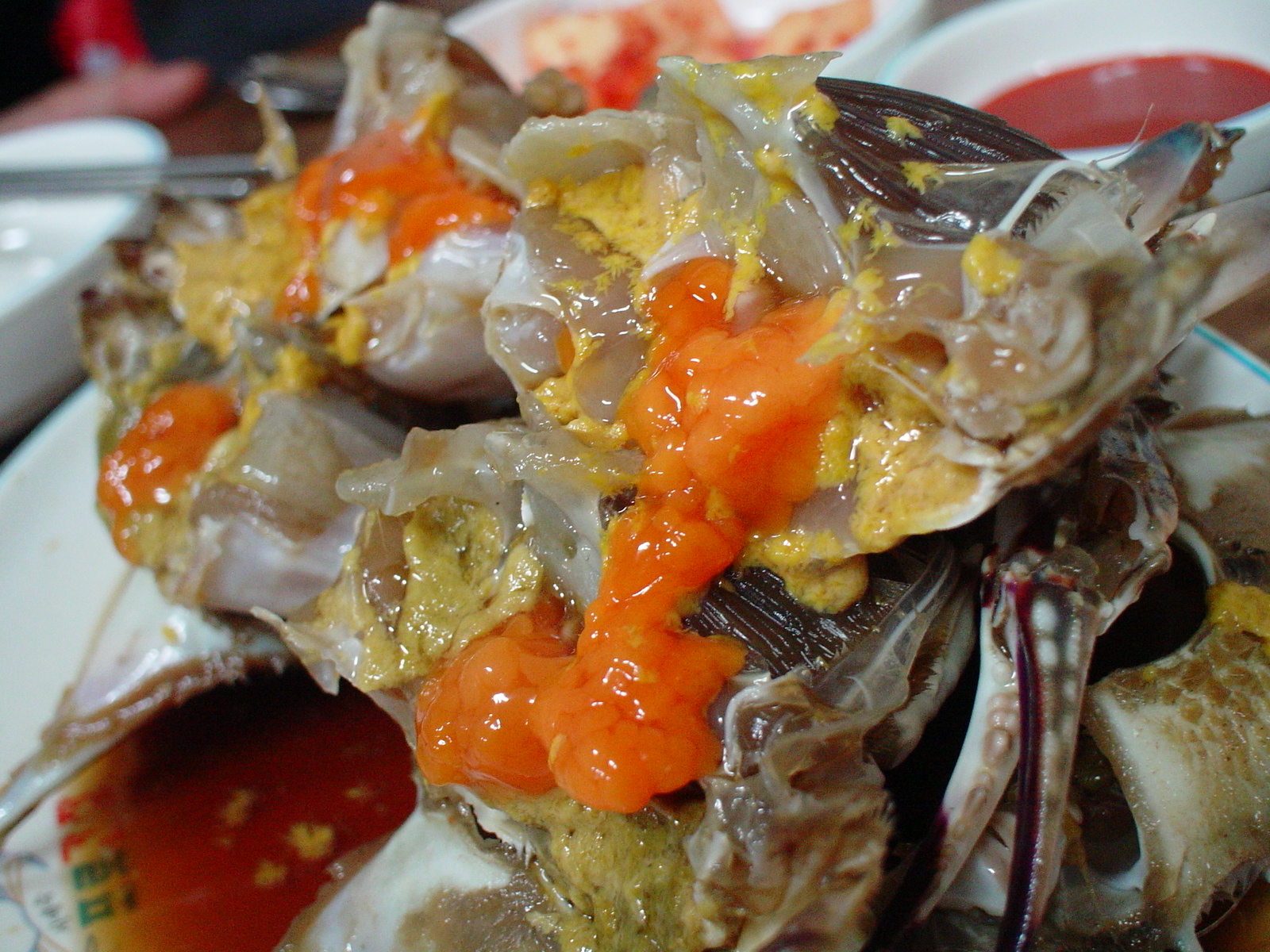
- Tomalley and roe of gejang ready to eat
- Type: Seafood

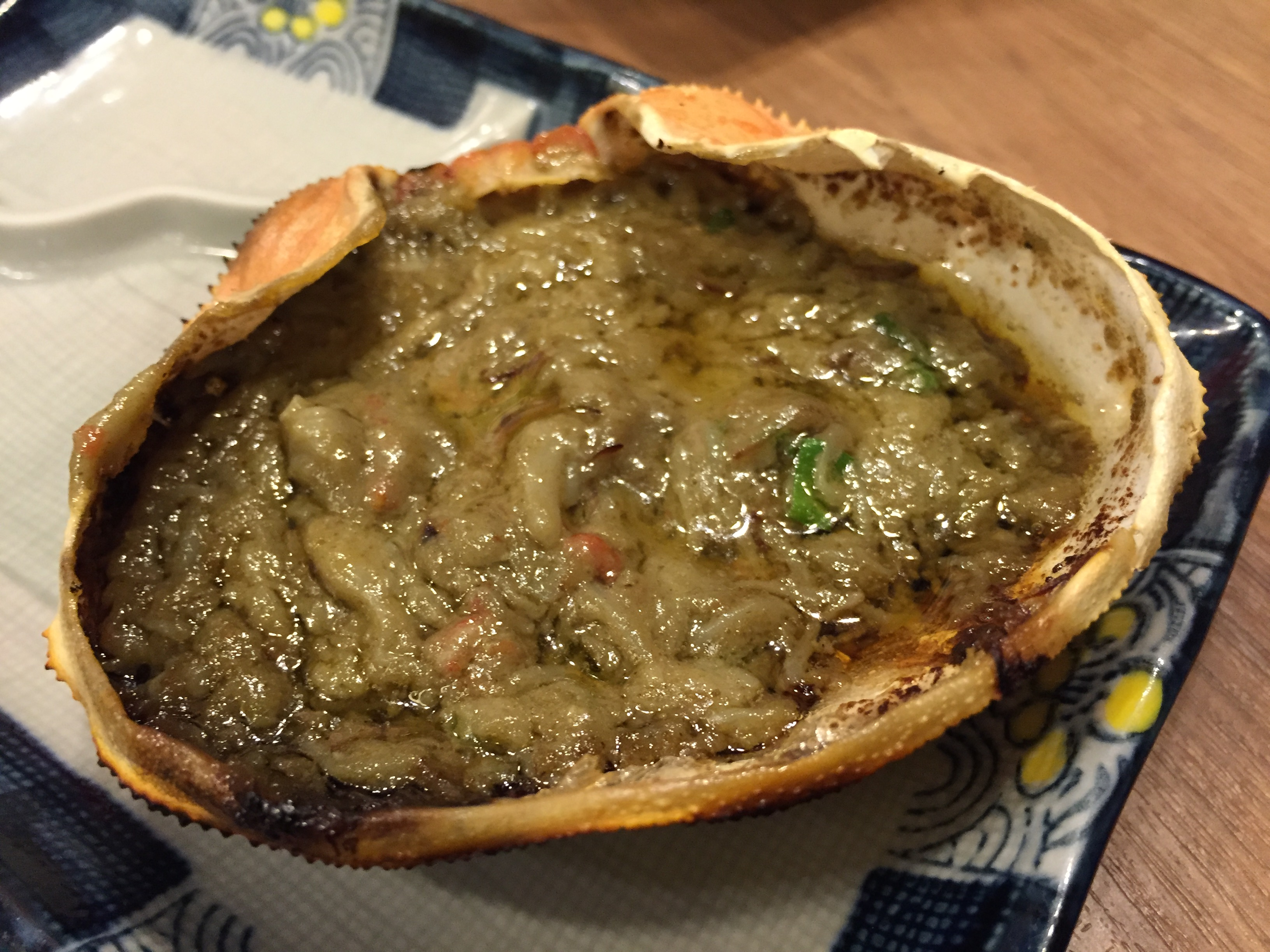
Japanese kourayaki, or blended crab tomalley and roe baked in its shell

Tomalley is the culinary name for the hepatopancreas (the organ that fulfills the functions of both the liver and the pancreas and is the main organ for storing fat and nutrients) of a crustacean. It typically refers to those in lobster or crab. Tomalley found in lobster is also called lobster paste, which can be found in the body cavity, and is soft and green; that found in crab is also called crab fat, crab butter or crab mustard, which is yellow or yellow-green in color. It is considered a delicacy, and may be eaten alone but is often added to sauces for flavour and as a thickening agent.

The term lobster paste or lobster pâté can also be used to indicate a mixture of tomalley and lobster roe. Lobster bisque, lobster stock, and lobster consommé are made using lobster bodies (heads), often including tomalley.

In Maryland and on the Delmarva Peninsula, the hepatopancreas of the blue crab is called the "muster" or "mustard", probably because of the yellow color, which is not the bright yellow of regular prepared yellow mustard, but closer to one of the brown mustards, such as Dijon mustard. Particularly when eating steamed or boiled crabs, it is considered a delicacy.

== Names ==
The word tomalley originates from the Carib word tumale, meaning a sauce of lobster liver.

In Japan, tomalley is known as kanimiso ("crab miso").

== Health risks ==
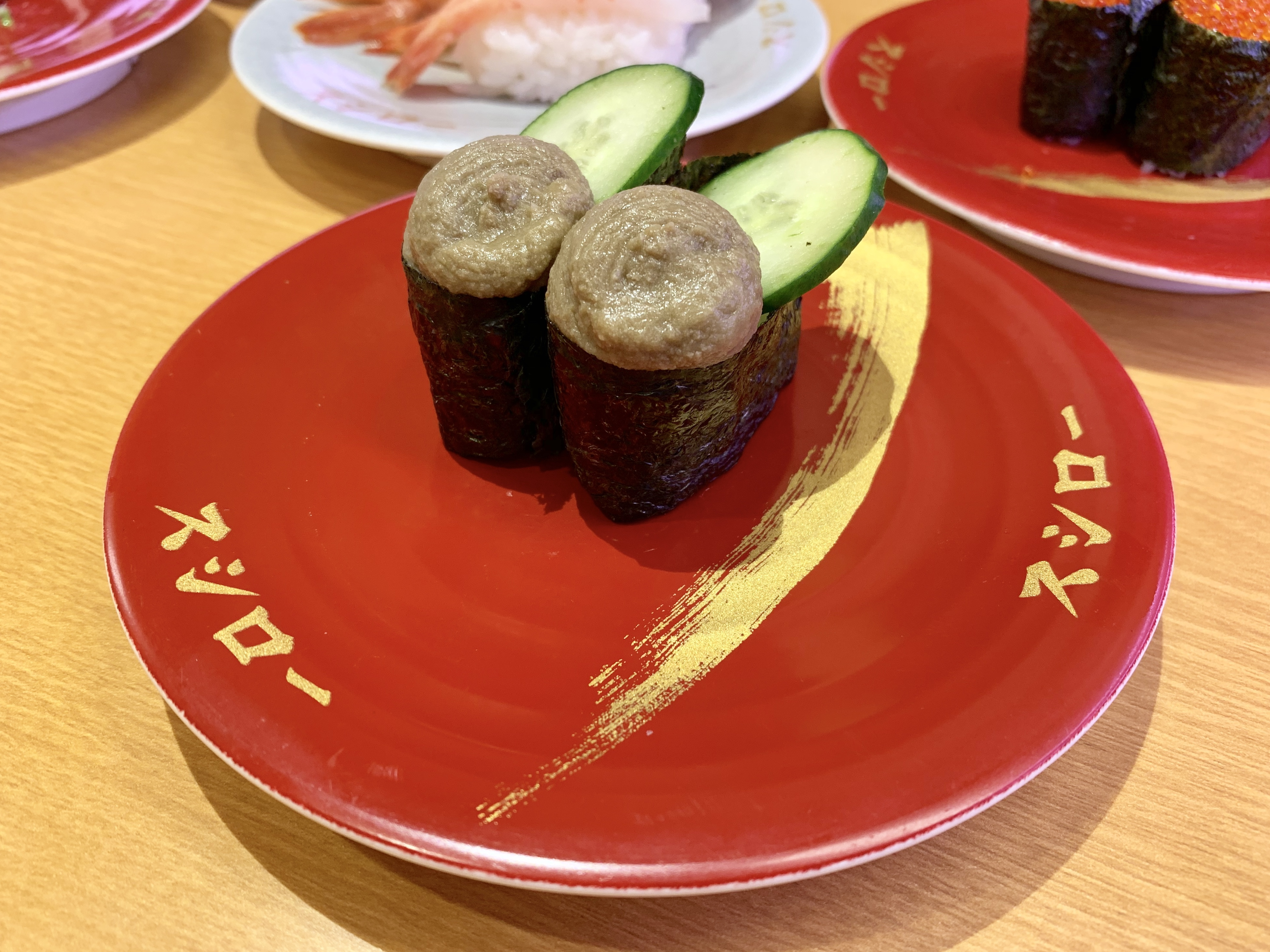
Sushi topped with crab tomalley (kanimiso)

The tomalley in general can be consumed in moderation as with the livers of other animals. It can, however, contain high levels of polychlorinated biphenyl (PCBs), dioxins, PFOA and mercury which can give rise to a number of negative health effects. It may also contain toxins that are associated with paralytic shellfish poisoning (saxitoxin and gonyautoxin). These toxins do not leach out when the lobster is cooked in boiling water. The toxins responsible for most shellfish poisonings are heat- and acid-stable, and thus are not diminished by cooking.

In July 2008, a report from the Maine Department of Marine Resources indicated the presence of high levels of paralytic shellfish poisoning toxin in some tomalley from lobsters in that state.

Also in July 2008, Massachusetts Department of Public Health reminded consumers not to eat American lobster tomalley, because it can build up high levels of toxins and other pollutants. The U.S. Food and Drug Administration (FDA) then issued an advisory against consuming tomalley from American lobster found anywhere in the Atlantic Ocean. In the same advisory the FDA stated that lobster tomalley "normally does not contain dangerous levels of paralytic shellfish poisoning toxins" and that the current high toxin levels were probably "associated with an ongoing red tide episode in northern New England and eastern Canada".

As of 2009 Maine has had a consumption advisory on lobster tomalley tissue for women who are or may become pregnant and children, because of mercury, PCBs and dioxins accumulating in it.

In April 2023, the Maine Department of Environmental Protection released a report on their monitoring of surface water for ambient toxins, which included sampling marine fish and shellfish on per- and polyfluoroalkyl substances (PFAS) compounds from 18 sites across the coast of Maine in 2021. Half of the sites had no detected perfluorooctane sulfonate (PFOS) in lobster meat. The other half from mostly the southwestern half of the coast had very low concentrations of PFOS that "should not pose risk in human consumption of lobster meat". Nine other PFAS compounds were detected in various samples at very low concentrations. As of August 2026, neither Maine nor the FDA have yet established regulatory levels for PFAS in seafood. Maine has only established Fish Tissue Action Levels for PFOS for recreationally caught freshwater and estuarine finfish at 3,500 ppt while the United States Environmental Protection Agency has set a final maximum contaminant level (MCL) for PFOS in drinking water at 4.0 ppt.

== See also ==
- Surimi
- Taba ng talangka
- List of crab dishes
- Foie gras
