= Aligue fried rice =

Filipino fried rice dish

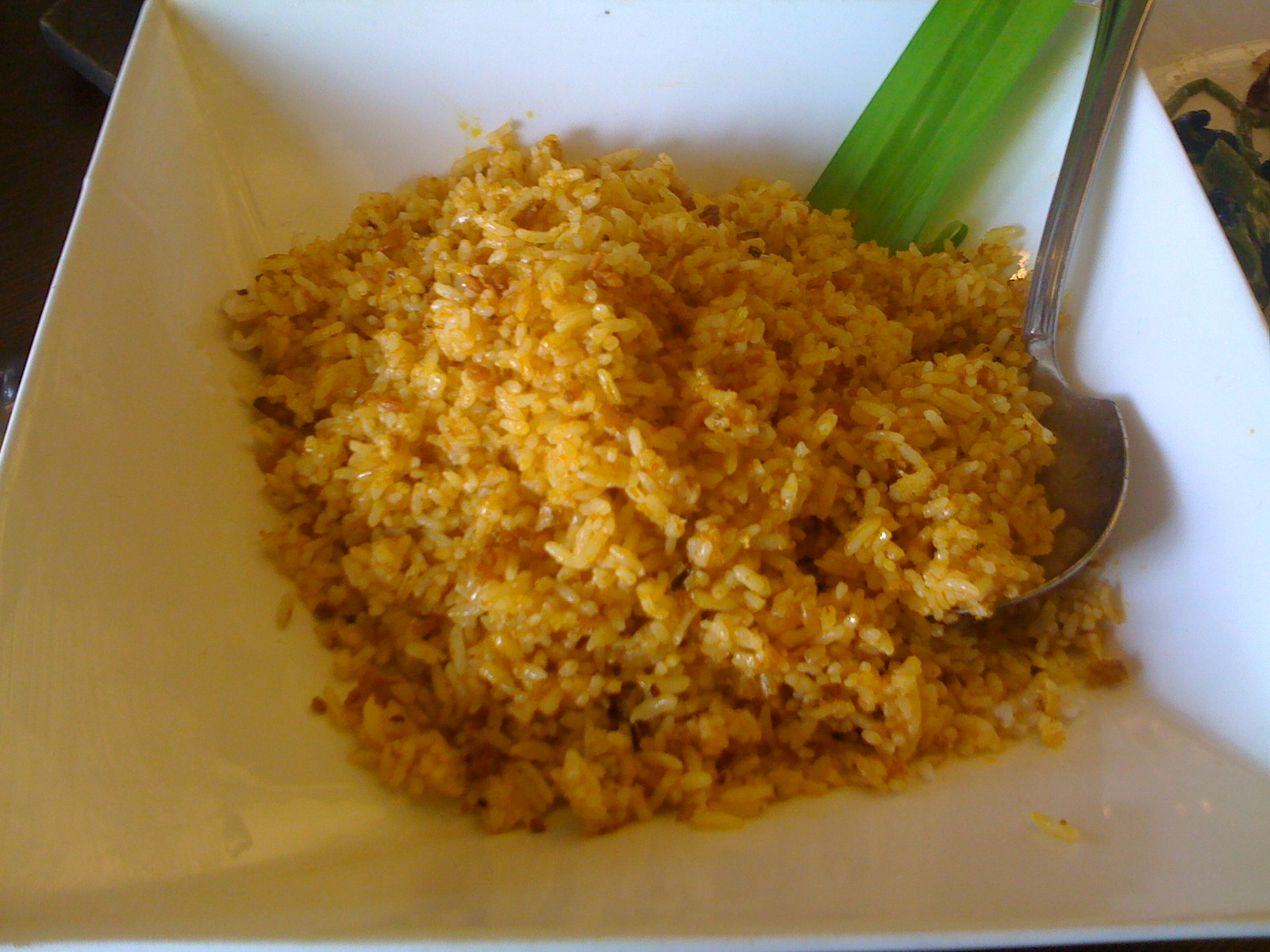
- Aligue fried rice with its distinctive marigold color
- Alternative names: Aligue rice, crab fat fried rice, inaliging sinangag
- Course: Main course
- Place of origin: Philippines
- Created by: Filipino cuisine
- Main ingredients: Fried rice in oil with aligue, garlic, spring onions, black pepper and salt

Aligue fried rice (Tagalog pronunciation: [alɪˈgɛ]), also known as crab fat fried rice or aligue rice, is a Filipino fried rice dish cooked by stir-frying pre-cooked rice with crab fat (taba ng talangka or aligue), toasted garlic, spring onions, black pepper, rock salt, and optionally butter. It is traditionally a vivid orange-yellow color due to the crab fat. It can be combined with seafood like shrimp and squid and eaten as is, or eaten paired with meat dishes.

It is a variant of sinangag (garlic fried rice) and is similar to bagoong fried rice, which uses bagoong (shrimp paste).

== See also ==
- Sinangag
- Fried rice
- Kiampong
- Kuning
- Sinigapuna
