= Taba ng talangka =

Filipino seafood paste

Tabâ ng talangkâ
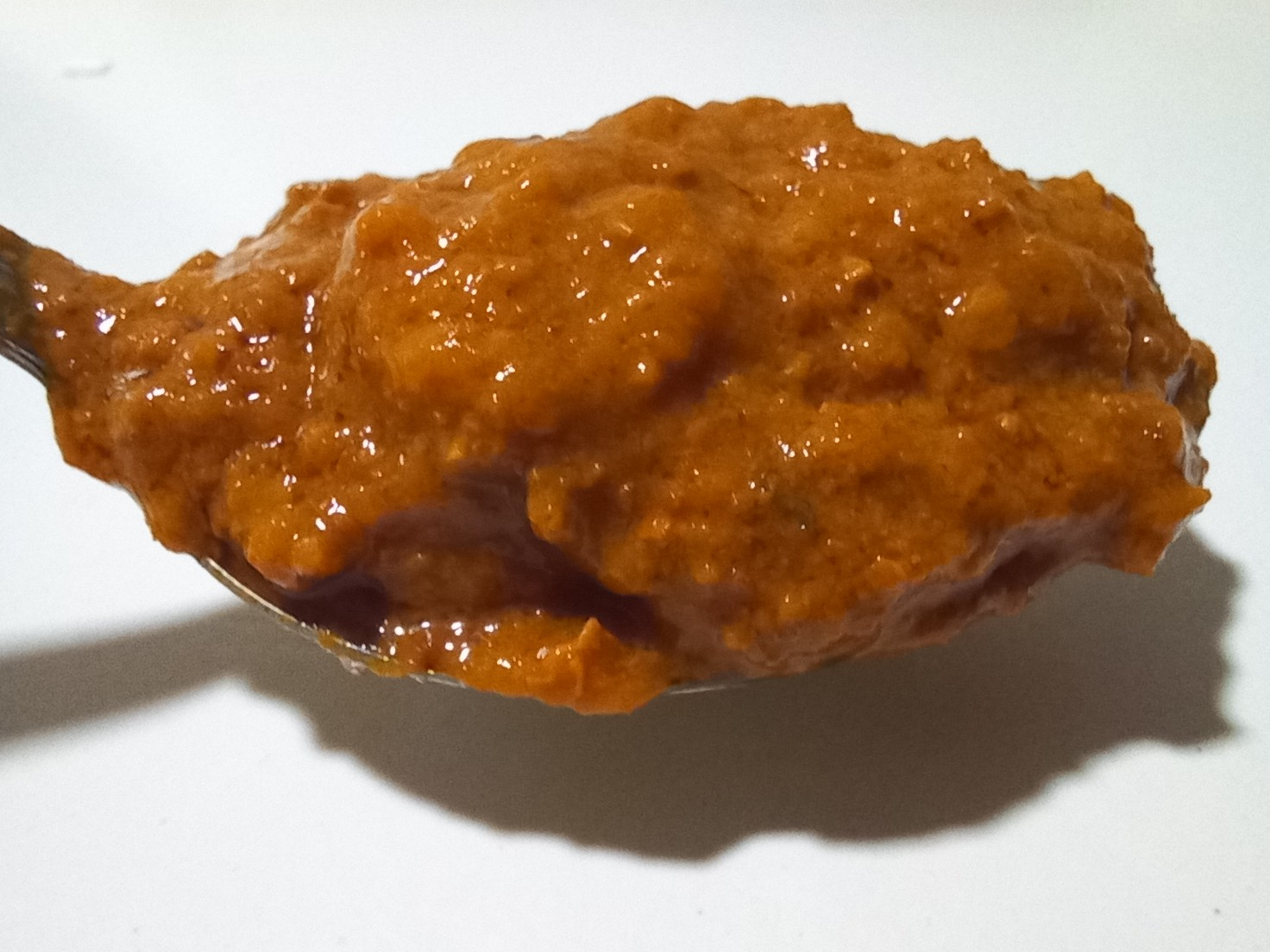
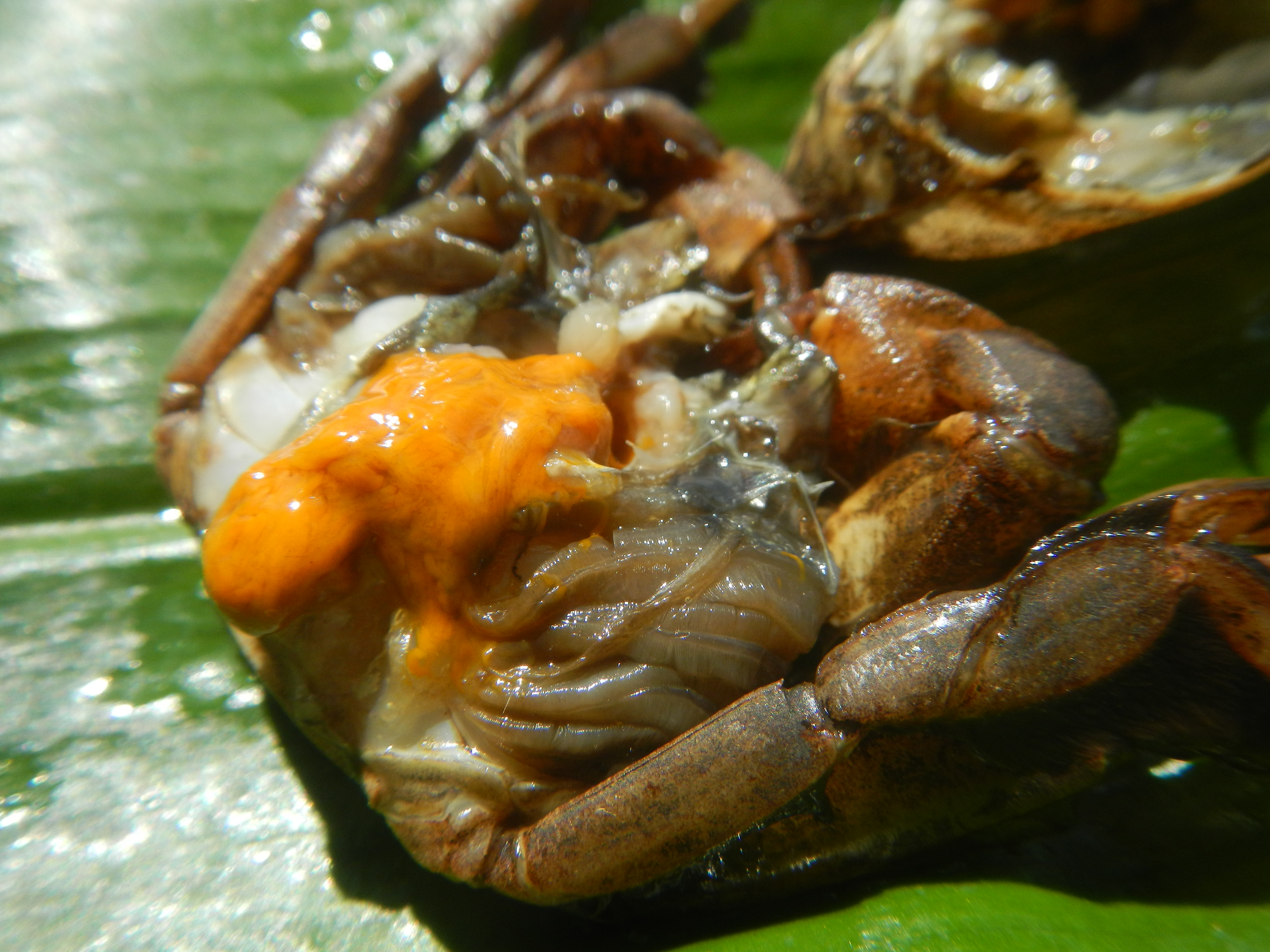
- Top: A spoonful of bottled tabâ ng talangkâ, Bottom: River crab aligé
- Alternative names: crab paste, crab roe, taba ning talangkâ, pula, tabang talangkâ, aligí/aligé, aligué/aliguí
- Course: Condiment, ingredient
- Place of origin: Philippines
- Similar dishes: bagoong

Tabâ ng talangkâ (Tagalog pronunciation: [tɐˈbaʔ nɐŋ tɐlɐŋˈkaʔ]), also known simply as aligí or aligé (Tagalog pronunciation: [alɪˈgɛ]; Philippine Spanish aligué), is a Filipino seafood paste derived from the roe and reddish or orange tomalley of river swimming crabs or Asian shore crabs (talangkâ).

Commercially sold variants of the condiment are sautéed in garlic, preserved in oil, and sold in glass jars. In parts of Pampanga and Bulacan, a preparation of the dish called burong tabâ ng talangkâ (fermented crab fat) consists of fresh river crabs stored covered in salt as a method of preservation. This variant is served during mealtime and is immediately consumed due to its perishability once removed from the salting container.

It can be served as an accompaniment to white rice, used as a condiment, or used as an ingredient in various dishes. Most notably, it is used as an ingredient of a variant of sinangag (Filipino fried rice) known as inaligíng sinangág.

== See also ==
- Bagoong
- Tomalley
- List of crab dishes
