= Gejang =

Marinated crab dish in Korean cuisine

Korean name
- Hangul: 게장; 게젓
- Hanja: 게醬
- RR: gejang; gejeot
- MR: kejang; kejŏt
- IPA: [kedʑaŋ]; [kedʑʌt̚]

Gejang (Korean: 게장) or gejeot (게젓) is a variety of jeotgal, or salted fermented seafood in Korean cuisine, which is made by marinating fresh raw crabs in either ganjang (soy sauce) or a chili pepper powder based sauce. The term consists of two words; ge, meaning "a crab", and jang which means "condiment" in Korean. The crabs selected for the Gejang dish are mainly female crabs with eggs.

While gejang was originally used to refer to crabs marinated in soy sauce, it is now also called ganjang-gejang (간장게장) to differentiate it from yangnyeom-gejang (양념게장). The latter is a relatively new dish that emerged alongside the boom in South Korea's restaurant industry. Its origins appear to come from the Chungcheong and Jeolla provinces, which both have long-standing traditions of mixing raw fish or dried pollock with a spicy red pepper flake or gochujang sauce. People later began preparing crab in a similar fashion, resulting in what is known today as yangnyeom-gejang. "Yangnyeom" means "seasoning" or "seasoned" in Korean, and refers to the spicy sauce of the dish that is made with chili pepper powder.

The Gyeongsang, Jeolla, and Jeju regions are famous for their own types of gejang. It is a representative specialty of Yeosu in South Jeolla Province, and a traditional Jeolla cuisine dish. According to Korean traditional medicine, crabs possess a 'cold nature' that can cool one's body temperature, and so gejang is believed to be good for driving away the spring fever.

== Historical records ==
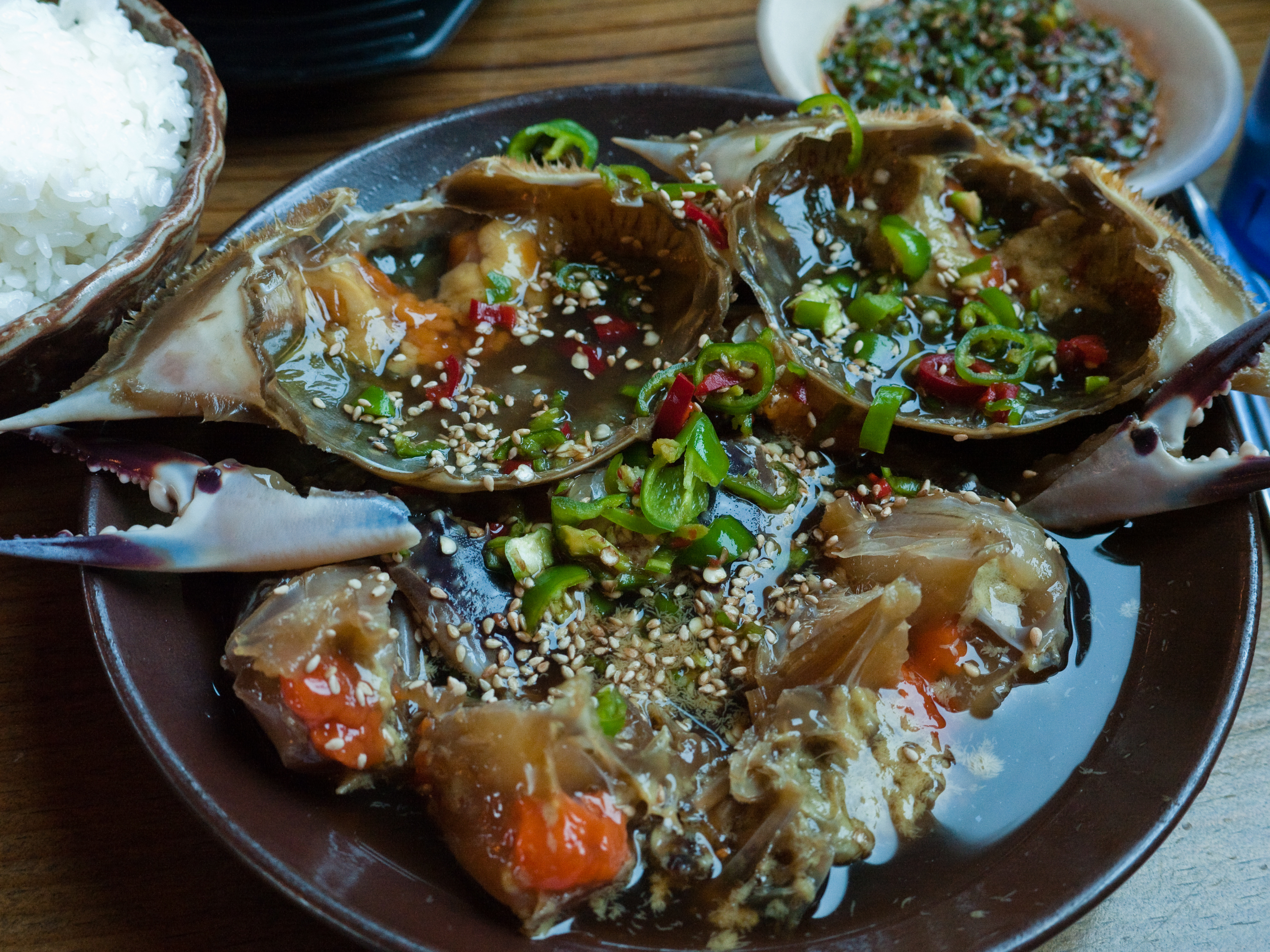
Gejang marinated in soy sauce

Historical records on gejang can be found in books such as Sallim gyeongje (lit. "Farm Management"), Gyuhap chongseo (lit. "Women's Encyclopedia"), Jubangmun (주방문; 酒方文; lit. 'Book of Making Alcoholic Beverages'), Siui jeonseo (lit. "Complete Collection of Corrections and Discussions"), and others written during the Joseon period (1392–1910). As a traditional Korean dish, is estimated to have been consumed on the Korean Peninsula since the 1600s. According to Sallim gyeongje which is written around the end of the 17th century, making gejang is referred to as "johaebeop" (조해법; 糟蟹法), which means "a way of marinating crabs in sediments of liquor". With this method, crabs are marinated in a mixture of jaegang (재강, sediments of liquor), salt, and an alcoholic beverage. Generally, gejang spoils if preserved for a long time; however, the gejang made using johaebeop can be eaten until the next spring. Additionally, the book records various ways of making gejang such as juhaebeop (酒蟹法, made with alcoholic beverage), chojang haebeop (醋醬蟹法, made with soy sauce and vinegar), and yeomtang haebeop (鹽湯蟹法, made with boiled salted water). It also records methods of crab rearing which are called Yukseon chibeop (肉膳治法). These records verify that the consumption of gejang in the Korean diet appeared as early as the 17th century. Historical records such as the "Gyuhap Chongseo," "Jubangmun," and "Shinui Jeonseo" mention gejang. Crabs were easily accessible by simply stepping into the water, and even when food was scarce, households could make soy sauce, making gejang a common dish. At that time, it was referred to as salted crab.

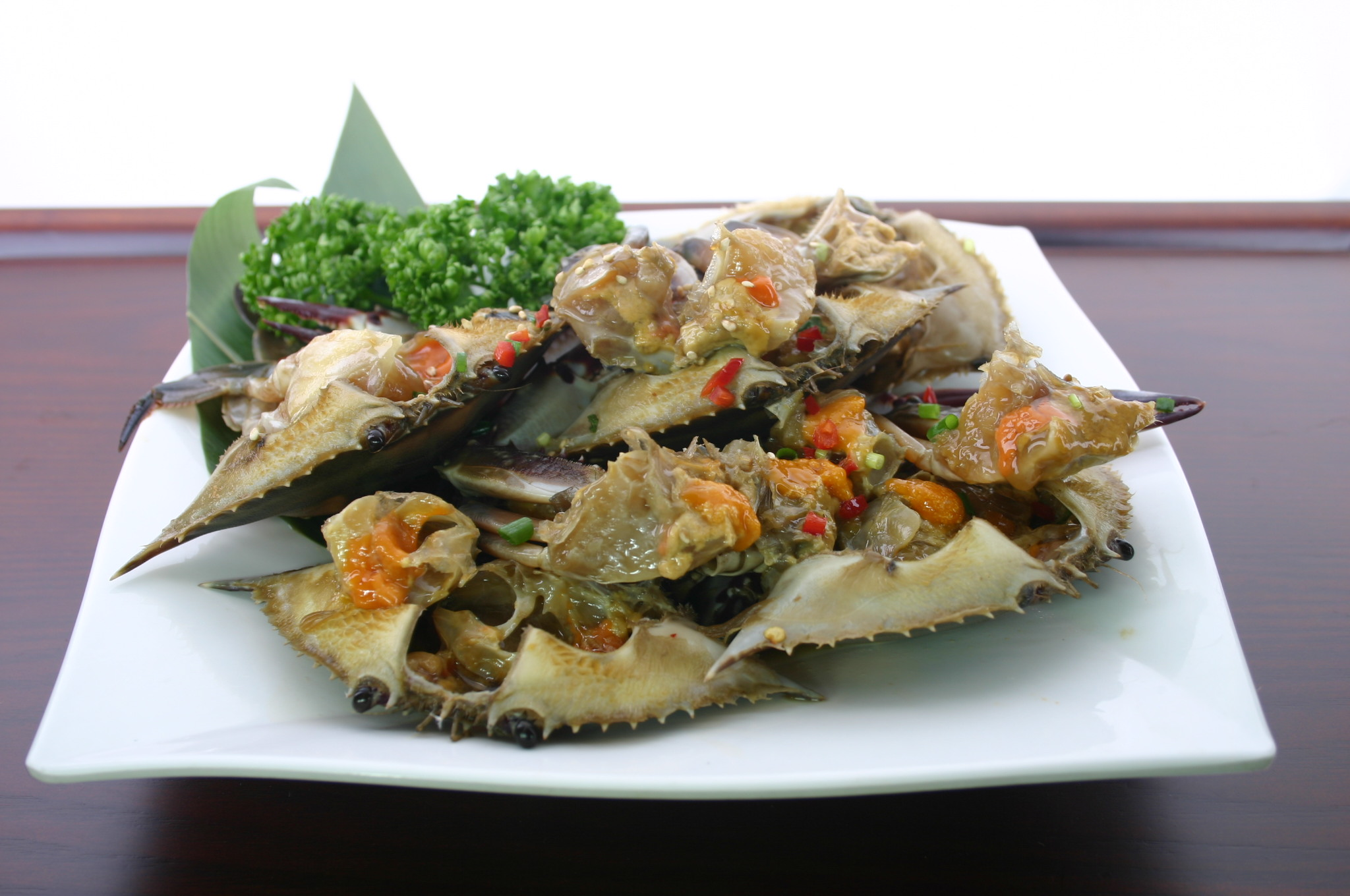

The term "ganjang gejang" (soy sauce marinated crab) became popular in South Korea south of the 38th parallel after yangnyeom gejang (spicy marinated crab) gained popularity in the 1980s. There are two main types of gejang that became popular in South Korea from the 1990s, differentiated by their marinades: the soy sauce-based ganjang gejang (간장게장) and the spicy yangnyeom gejang (양념게장) made with a chili seasoning. Typically, these dishes are eaten raw without heating. They are often referred to as "rice thieves" (밥도둑) because they pair so well with rice. The most delicious blue crabs are considered to be those caught from December to June for females, and from July to October for males, although the timing can vary by species. Outside these periods, rapidly frozen crabs may be used. Gejang is served in seafood and barbecue restaurants across South Korea, and there are also specialized gejang restaurants. It is sold in department store delis and markets as well. According to the South Korean Ministry of Unification's "Specialist Written Unification Food Recipe" on December 20, 2021, the Korean-style ganjang gejang popular in Japan does not exist in North Korea. Instead, North Korean gejang is characterized by the use of "dry soy sauce." This unique North Korean ingredient is a solid form of soy sauce, which is not yet used in South Korean cuisine. North Korean gejang is not cooked, so it is best to use richly flavored brewed soy sauce to enhance its taste and aroma. Yangnyeom gejang is a seasoned crab dish, and as people began to refer to it as such, the existing gejang became known as ganjang gejang. The commercialization of ganjang gejang began when several Korean celebrities started businesses under their names. Notably, the entertainer Kim Soo-mi was involved. As Korean celebrities promoted ganjang gejang, interest in the dish grew, leading to the establishment of ganjang gejang restaurants and increased consumption. In the 21st century, ganjang gejang has gained global popularity. It is particularly well-known in Japan, where it is highly recognized. The Japanese interest in ganjang gejang stems from the similarities in food culture, such as the use of soy sauce, rice, and seafood. Additionally, it was an unfamiliar type of food in Japan, and after the "Winter Sonata" boom, Japanese tourists visiting Korea often included ganjang gejang in their dining experiences. Consequently, some ganjang gejang restaurants in Seoul specifically target Japanese customers and offer services in Japanese. Since the 21st century, ganjang gejang has also become known in the United States and Western Europe, and it is now a common dish for visitors to Korea to try.

== Crabs and harvest ==
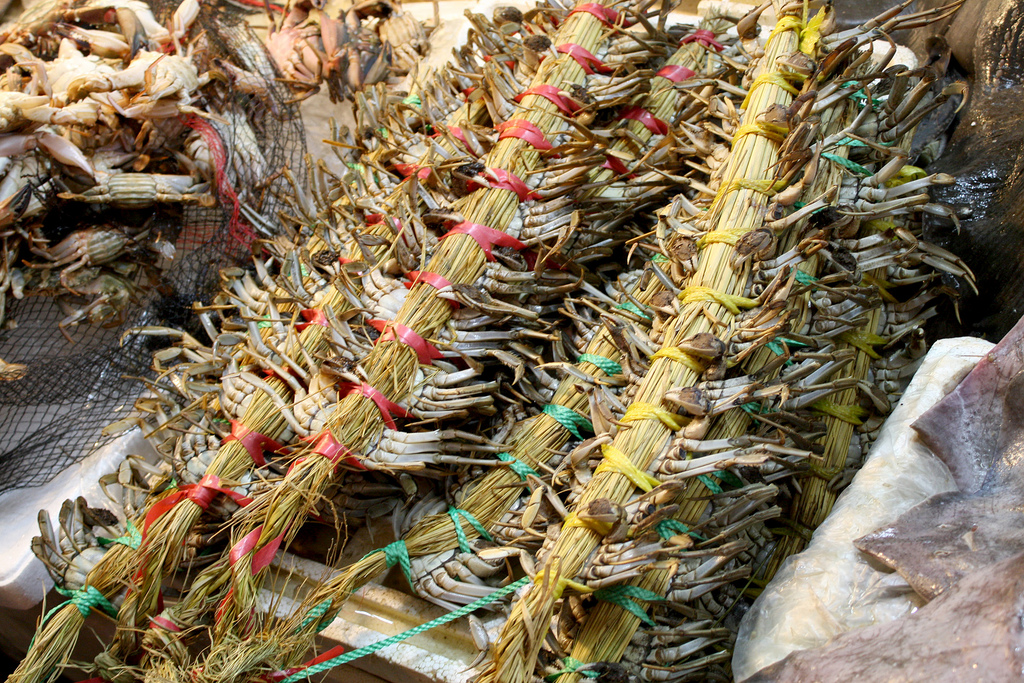
Live crab bundles at a market in Daejeon

Gejang was originally made with freshwater crabs which have become scarce likely due to overfishing and climate change. As a result, gejang is now commonly made with kkotge (horse crab), caught in the Yellow Sea (West Sea) on the west side of the Korean Peninsula. Among the most popular gejang made with freshwater crabs are, chamgejang of the North Gyeongsang Province, which can be preserved and eaten after a year, and beotteok gejang, which can be eaten immediately after preparation.

== Preparation ==
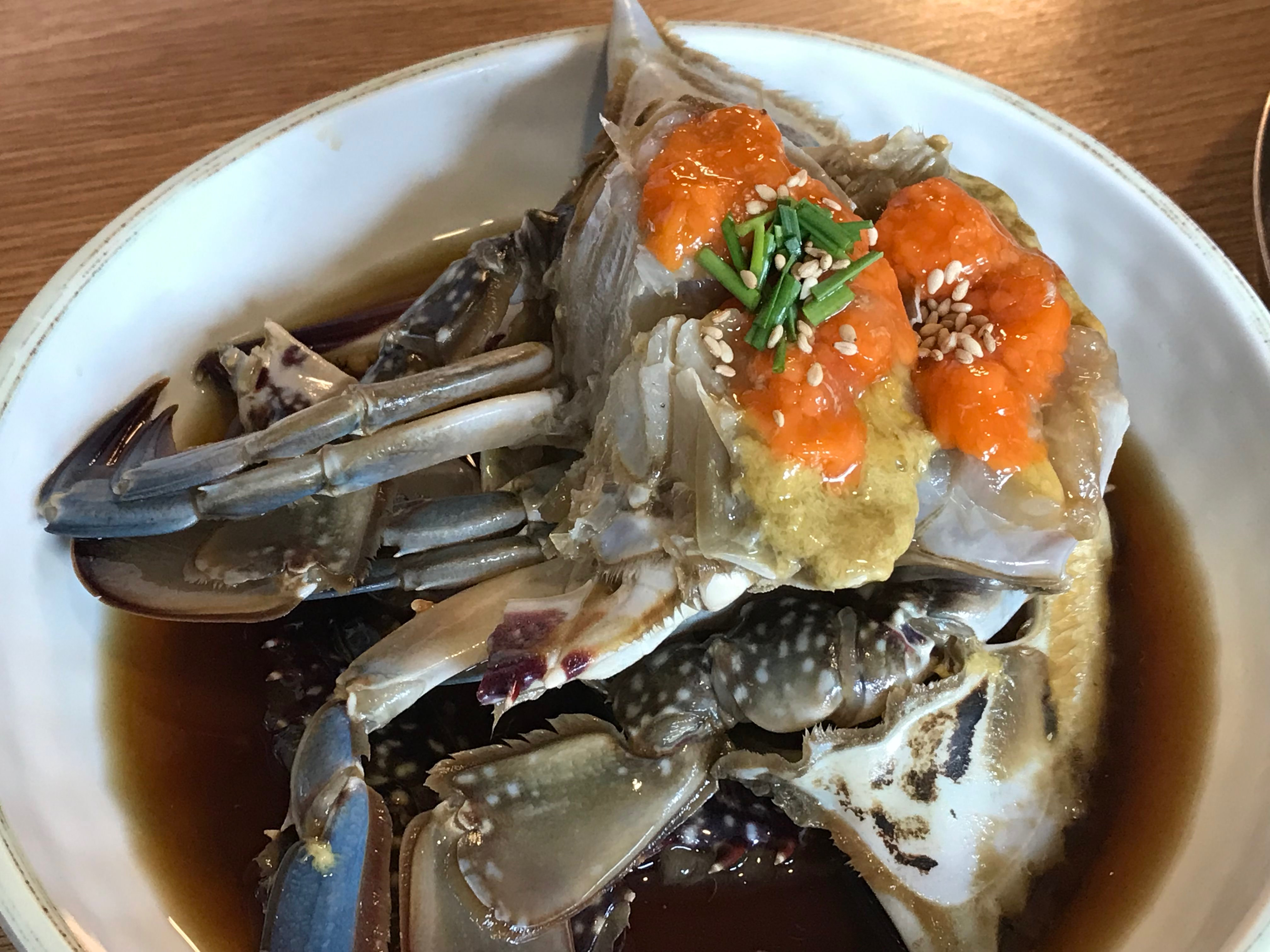

To prepare ganjang-gejang, crabs are first thoroughly cleaned using a brush while submerged in a bowl of water. They are then rinsed to remove moisture. Next, the crabs are put in a hangari (earthenware crock) and are salted for about six hours. To prepare the sauce, a mixture of ganjang is boiled briefly along with sesame oil, sugar, finely sliced scallions, minced garlic, ginger, and finely shredded fresh red chili pepper. Once the salted crabs are removed from the hangari and placed in a bowl, the hot sauce is poured onto the crabs. An hour later, the ganjang is removed from the bowl and reheated to reach its boiling point. It is again poured over the crabs. This procedure is repeated for a third and fourth time. The dish can be eaten once the sauce is chilled. If using boiled ganjang after it has been chilled, the gejang can be eaten two weeks after preparation, and can be preserved for even longer periods. A variation involves adding minced beef while the sauce is poured over the crabs, endowing the gejang with more spices. In present times, some people may choose to add lemon, chili pepper, or traditional medicine when making gejang to remove its fishy smell and increase its rich flavor.

As for yangnyeom gejang, the dish is made with raw crabs seasoned with a sweet and spicy sauce of chili pepper powder, ground Korean pear, onions, ginger, garlic, whole sesame seeds, and sesame oil. The gejang can be eaten half a day after it is prepared. It is also best to consume the dish within two or three days to keep its sweet, spicy, and sour taste intact. If the crabs are first marinated in a boiled and then chilled mixture of eakjeok (액젓, filtered jeotgal) and soy sauce before adding in the spicy sauce, the yangnyeom gejang can be well marinated with the latter sauce, and be preserved longer.

== Types ==
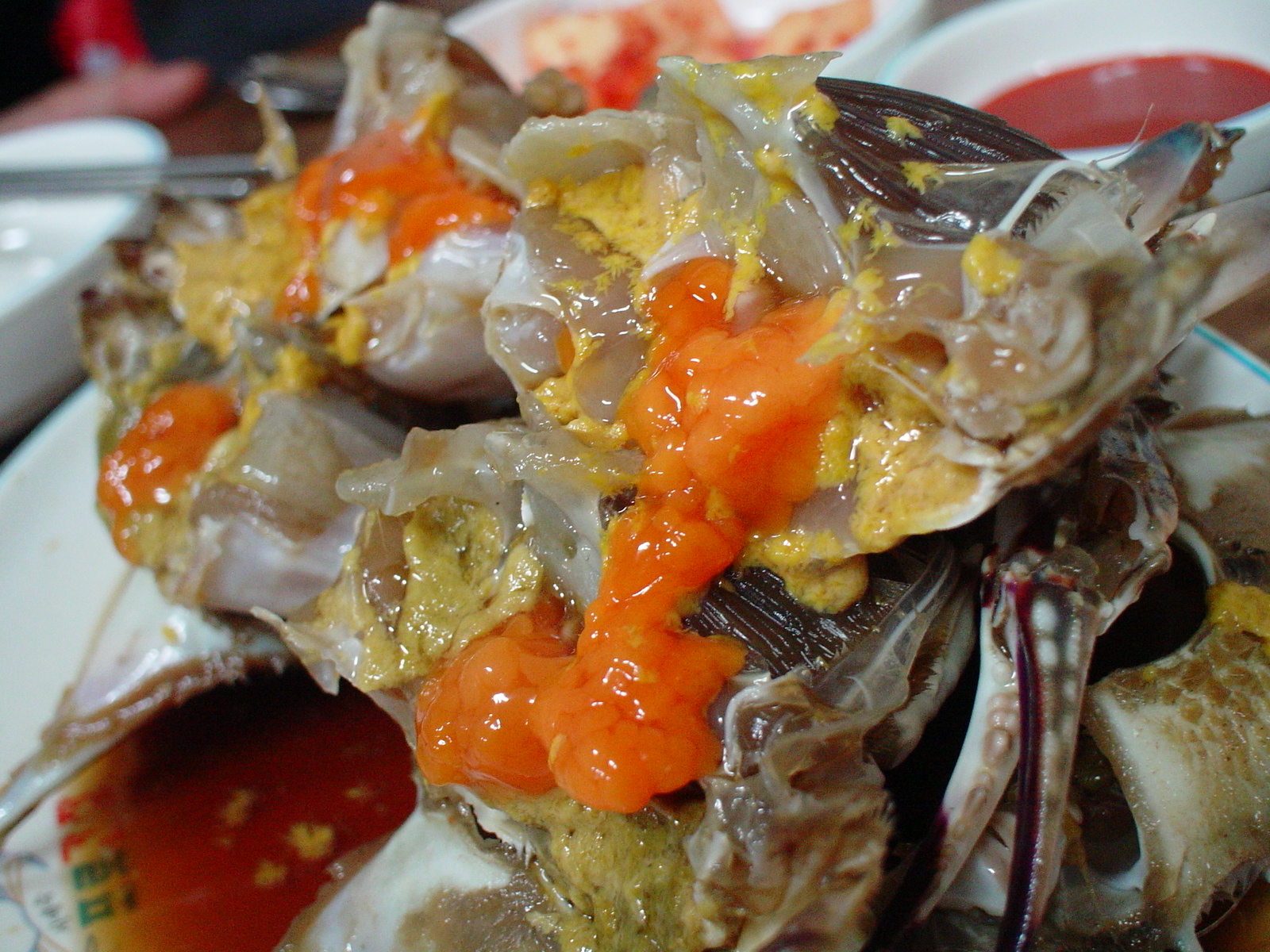
Served ready to eat the tomalley and roe of Gejang

Types are divided by crab species, region, and cooking method. Among varieties, beoltteok gejang (벌떡게장) is a local specialty of the Jeolla Province and is made with live Charybdis, which are called either beoltteokge (벌떡게) or minkkotge (민꽃게) in Korean. The crab has a hard carapace with a reddish-brown color and is found in the seawater of Korea, according to Jasaneobo (자산어보 "Fishes of the Huksan Island"), the first Korean fisheries science book written by scholar Jeong Yak-jeon (정약전) in 1814. To make the gejang, the crabs are cut into several pieces or used whole if they are not large. One to two days after the beoltteokge has been marinated in a ganjang-based sauce, one can enjoy the gejang which has a fresh and sweet taste. However, beoltteok gejang can not be preserved for a long time, so it is said that the name reflects the fact; beotteok means "quickly" or "immediately" in Korean.

Kkotgejang (꽃게장) is made with kkotge (horse crab) which is the most consumed crab in South Korea. It is also a local specialty of the Jeolla Province and is known for its umami taste. After being cleaned, the live crabs are chopped into several pieces and a mixture of ganjang, containing sliced scallions, garlic, ginger, chili pepper powder, sesame seeds, and salt is poured over them. It can be eaten one day after preparation.

Another local specialty of the Jeolla Province is konggejeot (콩게젓) which is indigenous to Gangjin County. The gejang is made by grinding crabs as small as a bean (kong in Korean) with millstones. The thick ground paste is mixed with salt and gochujang. In Jeju Island, gejang is called gingijeot (깅이젓) and is made on the 15th day, 3rd month of the Korean calendar (lunisolar) at low tide. Traditionally, gingijeot is said to be a good cure for many illnesses in the region.

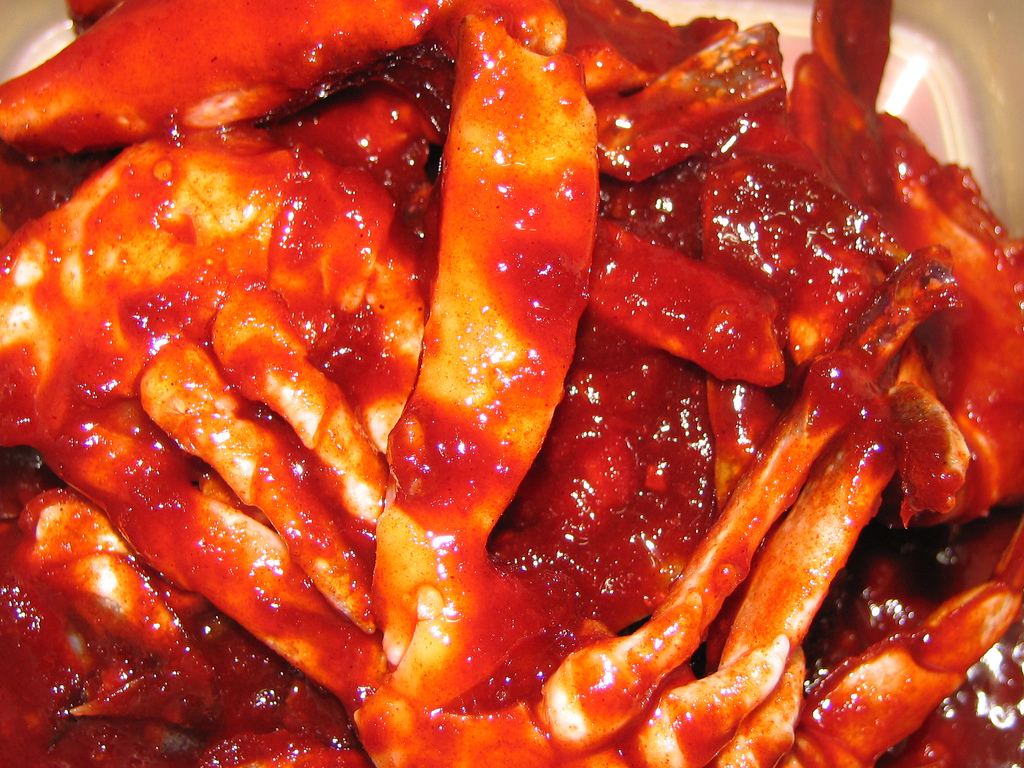
Yangnyeom gejang

Chamgejang (참게장) is a local specialty of the Gyeonggi Province. It is made with chamge (Chinese mitten crab) which generally live in the rivers of Korea that flow to the Yellow Sea. Chamge harvested in the Imjin River near the Paju region, is especially famous for its unique taste and less earthy smell. Thus, for many centuries the crabs were presented to the King of Korea as a delicacy. As records on chamge can be found in several historical documents regarding fisheries and cuisine such as Jasaneobo, Gyuhap chongseo (Women's Encyclopedia), and the chapter Jeoneoji (전어지) of Imwon gyeongjeji (임원경제지), it is clear that the dish has been a long-standing Korean delicacy. In present times, river pollution has decreased the crab's habitat. As a result, chamge is rarely found except in the Imjin River. Chamgejang is commonly nicknamed "bapdoduk' (밥도둑, its literal translation being "a meal thief" or "a rice thief") because it is considered a good dish for arousing one's appetite. As this dish is intended to be preserved for long periods of time, the gejang is typically saltier than other varieties.

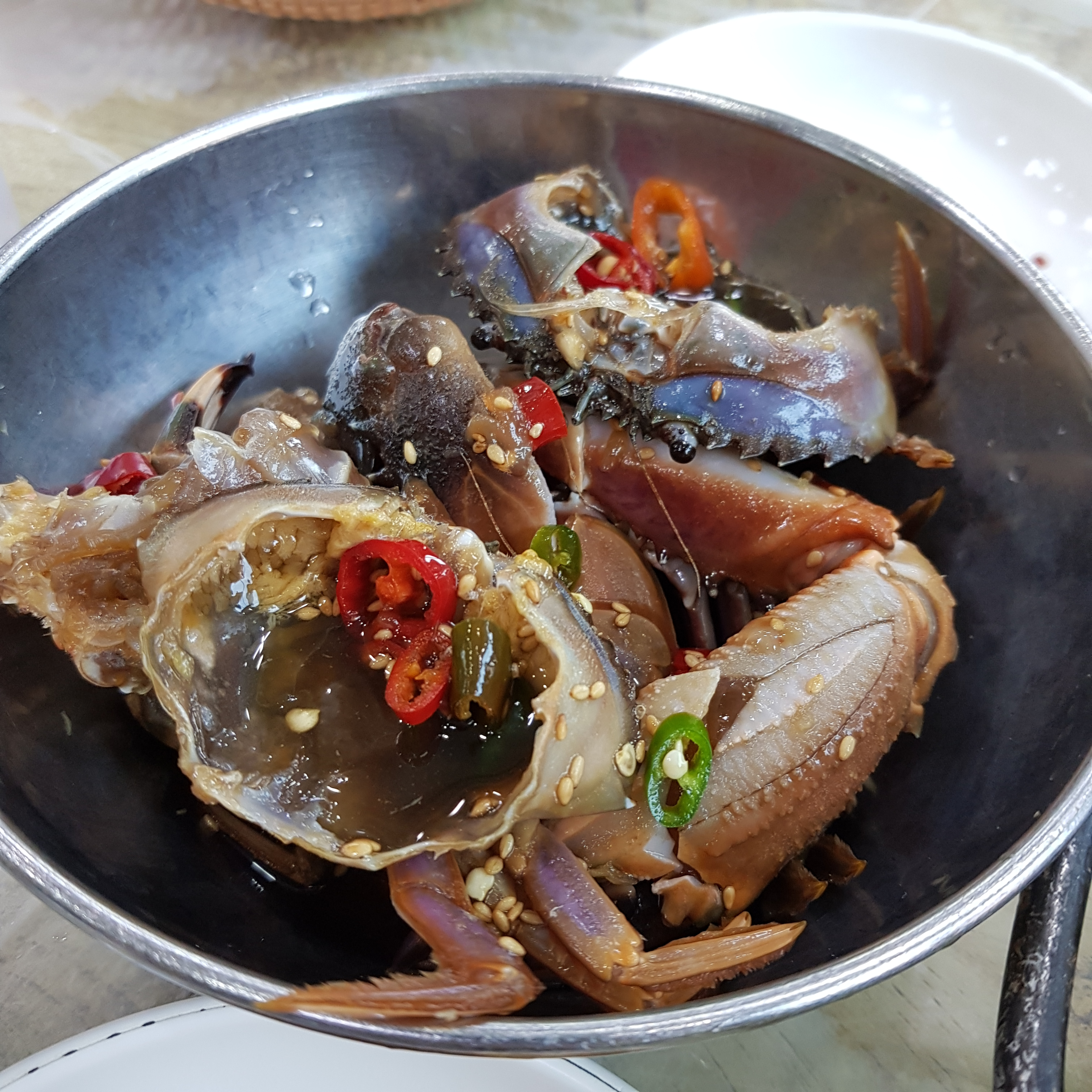
Ganjang gejang

Chamgejang is also widely eaten in the Gyeongsang Province, and is prepared at every house during autumn to make a banchan (small side dish) for the next summer. The crabs are also caught in rice fields during the harvest season, with female crabs being considered ideal as they contain more roe and fatty tomalley.

== Serving ==
Yeosu is famous for gejang as well as gat-kimchi (갓김치). A meal emphasizing ganjang-gejang is called gejang baekban (게장백반) that consists of a plate ganjang-gejang, various plates of banchan (side dishes), and a bowl of cooked rice. However, it can also be served by itself, though it is not popularly used as such.

== Health and safety ==
Consumption of raw freshwater crab or crayfish in gejang poses a risk of Paragonimus westermani infection (paragonimiasis), as the parasite's metacercariae can survive soy sauce marination and remain infectious even under high-salt, refrigerated conditions. Additionally, frequent consumption of gejang—particularly five or more times per week or exceeding 200 cm³ per month—has been associated with elevated blood cadmium levels, as crabs bioaccumulate this heavy metal in their internal organs. To mitigate these risks, health authorities recommend limiting intake frequency and ensuring that any freshwater crustaceans used are properly cooked or frozen before preparation, as traditional marination does not guarantee safety.

== See also ==
- Jeotgal, salted fermented seafood
- Jangajji, salted pickled vegetables
- Banchan, small side dishes
- Korean cuisine
- List of crab dishes
- List of seafood dishes
- Bakhia paste, a fermented crab paste similar to gejang in southern Vietnam made from vinegar crab (Episesarma mederi)
