= Khao khluk kapi =

Flavorful dish in Thai cuisine

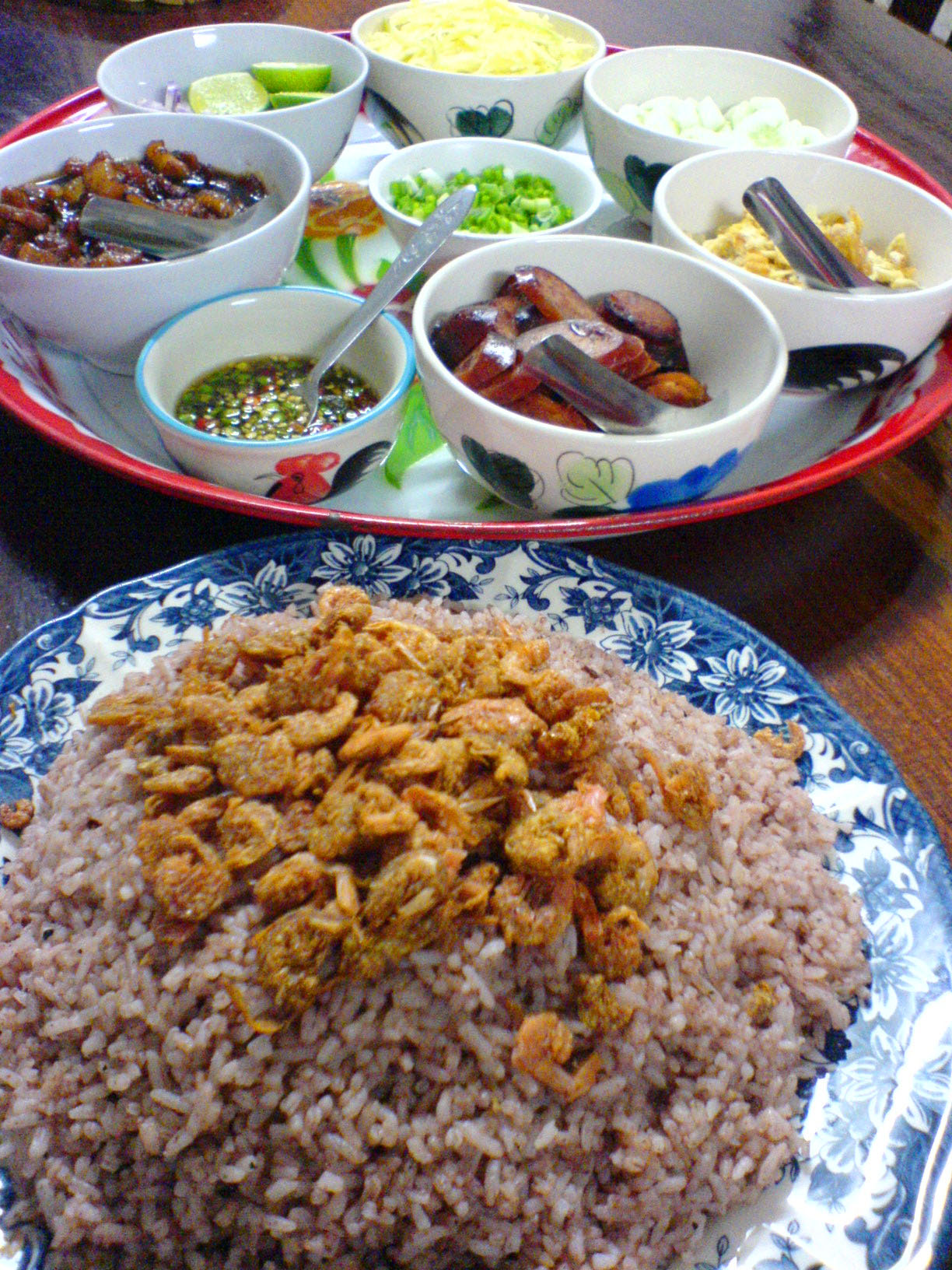
- Khao khluk kapi with various toppings
- Type: Rice dish
- Course: Main course
- Place of origin: Central Thailand (adapted from the original Mon dish)
- Region or state: Southeast Asia
- Associated cuisine: Thailand

Khao khluk kapi (Thai: ข้าวคลุกกะปิ, pronounced [kʰâːw kʰlúk kāpìʔ]; sometimes spelled as khao kluk kapi) is a flavorful dish in Thai cuisine that consists of the primary ingredients of fried rice mixed with shrimp paste, the latter of which is known as "kapi" in Thai. The dish is typically served with several side dishes or toppings, such as sliced cucumber, sliced shallot, onion or purple onion, deep-fried or fried shrimp, shredded or thinly sliced sour green mango, chili peppers, deep-fried chili peppers, sliced thin egg omelet or crêpe, sweetened roasted pork, pork belly (Chinese mu wan), Chinese sausage such as kun chiang, and mackerel, among others.

It has been described as a salad dish per the vegetables that accompany the dish, and as possessing the flavors of saltiness per the shrimp paste, sweetness per the fruits, and spiciness, per the chili peppers.

Outside Thailand, the Filipino Bagoong fried rice can be considered a comparable equivalent to this dish.

== History ==
Khao khluk kapi's recipe was adapted from an original Mon dish during the time of King Rama II. It is originated in Central Thailand (historical Mon settlement region), and is typically served as a lunch dish in Thailand. Foreign visitors to Thailand may not be aware of the dish's existence.

== See also ==
- Bagoong fried rice
- List of Thai dishes
- List of rice dishes
