= Sinangag =

Filipino fried rice dish

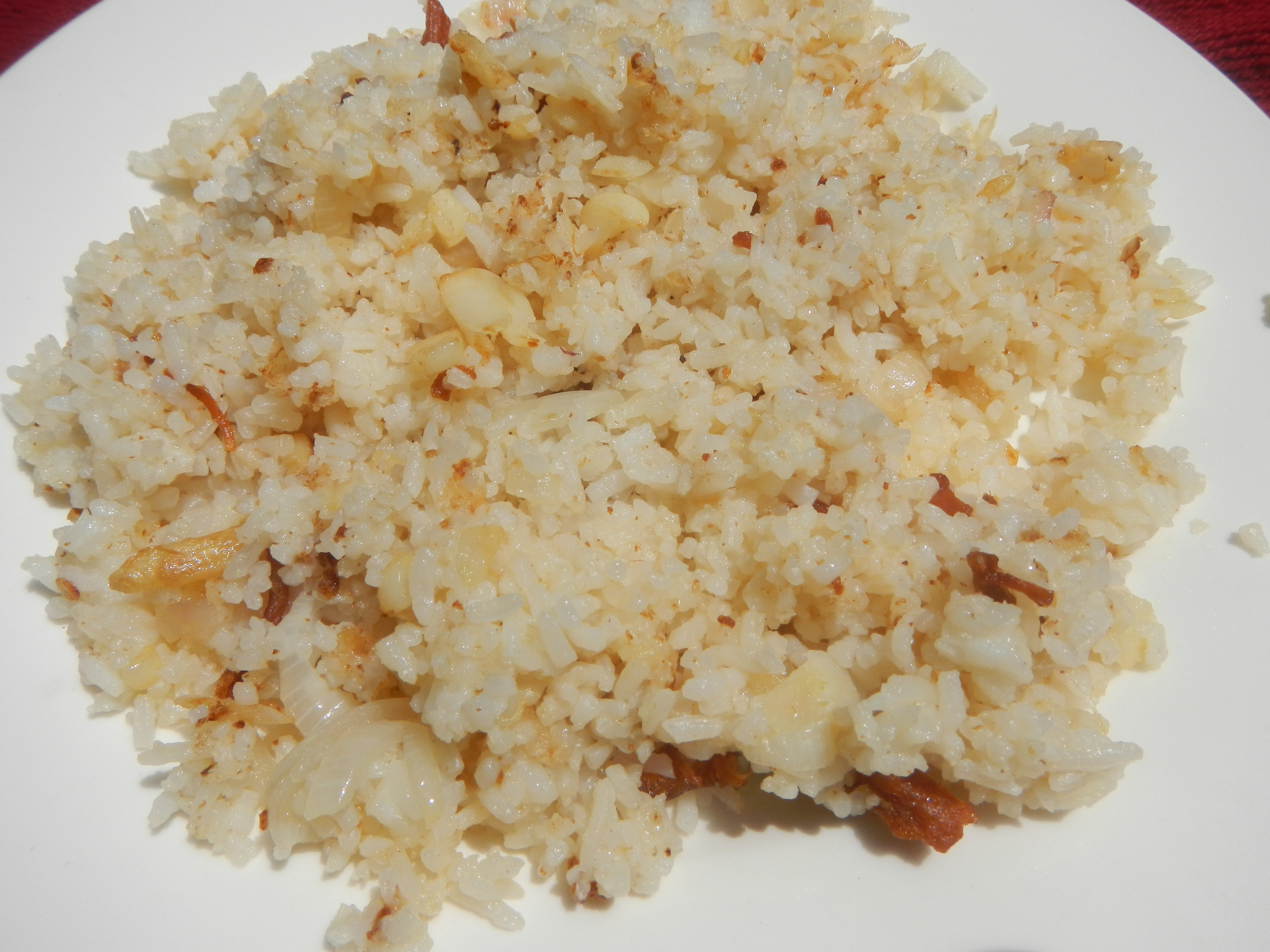
- Garlic fried rice with optional meat scraps.
- Alternative names: Garlic fried rice, garlic rice, Filipino fried rice, Philippine fried rice, kinirog (Ilocano)
- Course: Main course (breakfast)
- Place of origin: Philippines
- Region or state: Philippines, also popular in Indonesia, Malaysia and Singapore
- Created by: Filipino cuisine
- Main ingredients: Fried rice, garlic
- Variations: Aligue rice, bagoong fried rice
- Similar dishes: Morisqueta tostada

Sinangag (Tagalog pronunciation: [sinɐˈŋag]), also called garlic fried rice or garlic rice, is a Filipino fried rice dish cooked by stir-frying pre-cooked rice with garlic. The rice used is preferably stale, usually leftover cooked rice from the previous day, as it results in rice that is slightly fermented and firmer. It is optionally garnished with toasted garlic flakes and sometimes chopped scallions. The rice grains are ideally loose and not stuck together.

It is rarely eaten on its own, but is usually paired with a "dry" meat dish such as tocino (bacon), longganisa (sausage), tapa (dried or cured meat), Spam, or daing (dried fish), as well as the addition of scrambled or fried eggs. Unlike other types of fried rice, it does not normally use ingredients other than garlic, in order not to overwhelm the flavour of the main dish. In the Visayas regions of the Philippines, sinangag was traditionally seasoned with asín tibuok.

Sinangag is a common part of a traditional Filipino breakfast and is usually prepared with leftover rice from the dinner before. Sometimes, it is cooked in the leftover sauces and oils from Philippine adobo, lessening food waste. Preparing sinangag from freshly-cooked rice is frowned upon in Filipino culture. It is one of the components of the tapsilog breakfast and its derivatives.

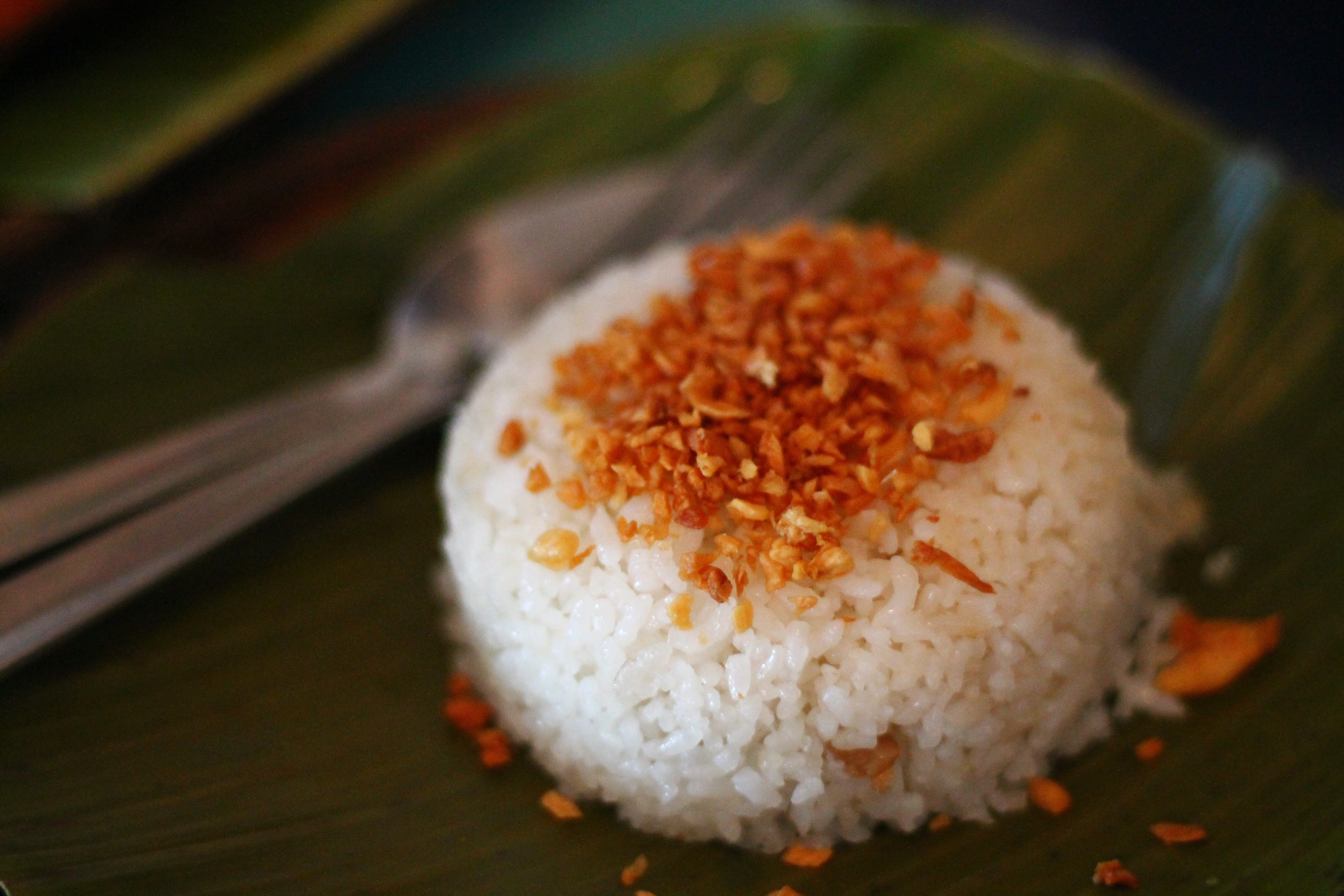
Plain boiled rice with toasted garlic flakes, sometimes passed off as "garlic rice"

Plain boiled rice (sinaing, or called by the general term for cooked rice, kanin) is sometimes topped with toasted garlic flakes and erroneously called "garlic rice", especially in lower-cost eateries and restaurants. True garlic rice or sinangag is garlic fried rice.

== See also ==
- Aligue fried rice
- Bagoong fried rice
- Cuisine of the Philippines
- Fried rice
- Kiampong
- Kuning
- List of fried rice dishes
- List of garlic dishes
- Morisqueta tostada
- Sinigapuna
