= Tocino =

Crunchy strips of skin and bacon cut from pork loin

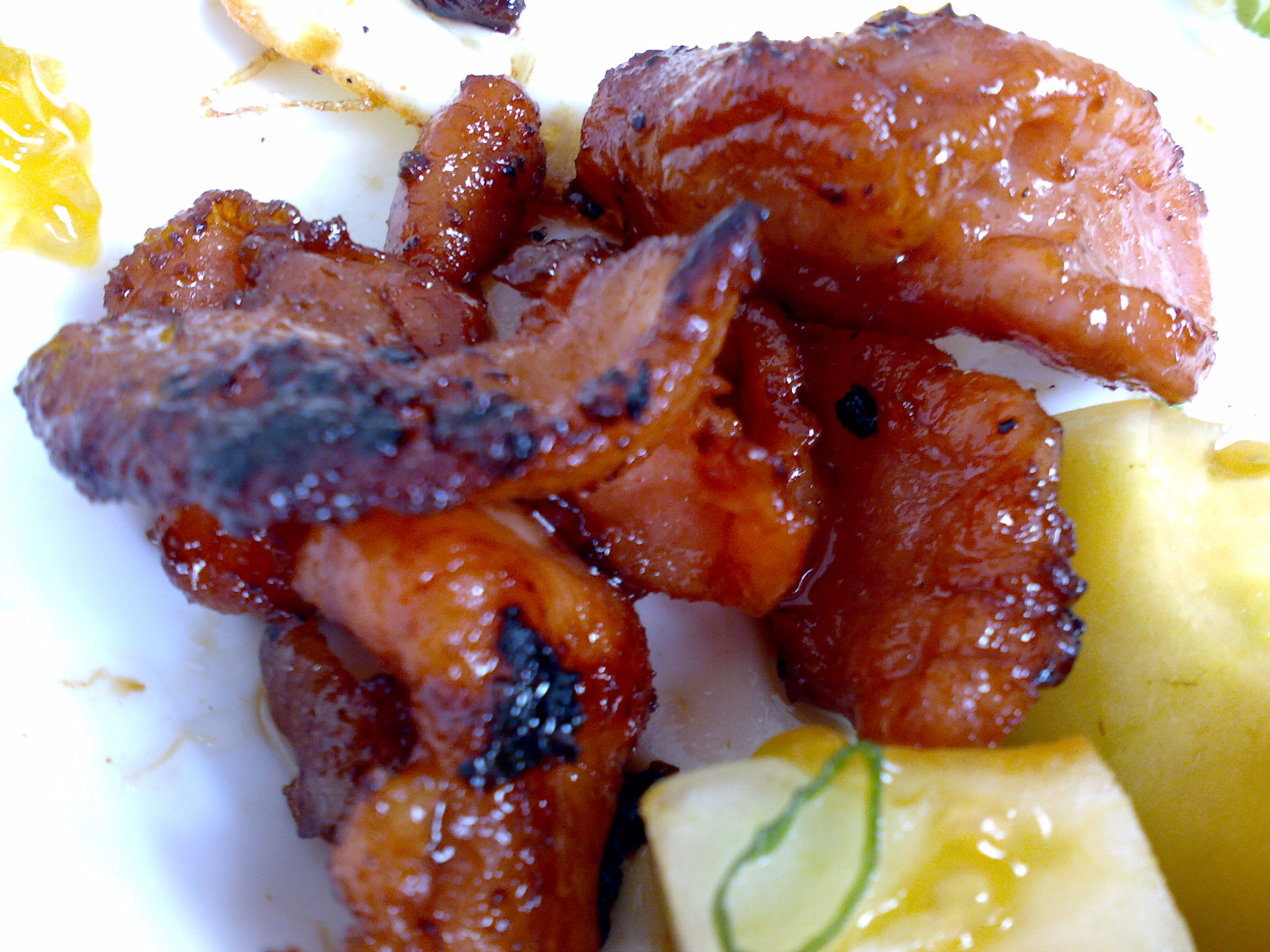
Philippine tocino

Tocino is bacon in Spanish, typically made from the pork belly and often formed into cubes in Spain. In Caribbean countries, such as Puerto Rico and Cuba, tocino is made from pork fatback and is neither cured nor smoked but simply fried until very crunchy; it is then added to recipes, much like the way lardons are used in French cuisine. In the Philippines, tocino refers to sweetened and cured pork belly.

== Spain ==
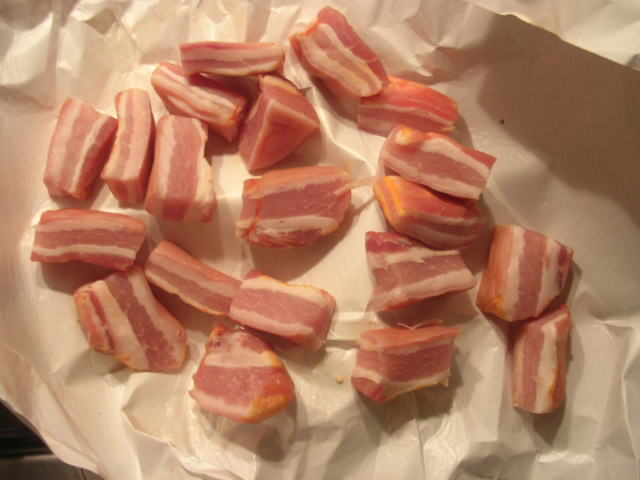
Uncooked Spanish tocino

In Spain, as in Venezuela (where bacon is "tocineta"), the word tocino refers to the layer of fat under a pig's skin. It is almost pure fat, and is often salted and cut into cubes. It is consumed as part of traditional recipes such as cocido.

== Philippines ==
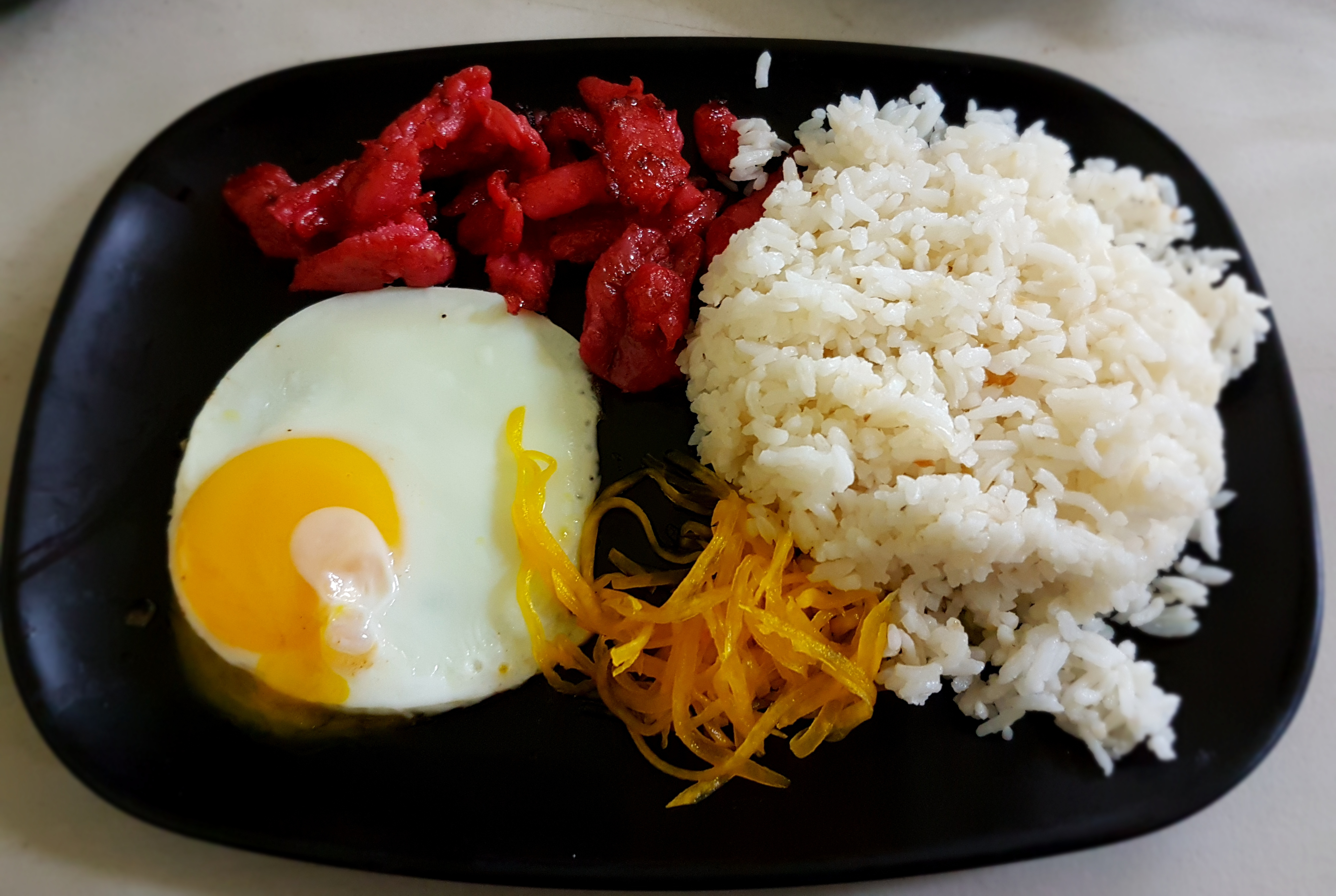
Tosilog, a typical almusal (breakfast) composed of tocino, fried eggs, sinangág (garlic fried rice), with atchara (pickled papaya) as a side dish

In making tocino in the Philippines, the pork belly meat is first sliced into thin strips. Anise wine, annatto, water, sugar, and salt are combined in a container, and the meat strips are sprinkled with the mixture and stacked in a container, which is covered and refrigerated for three days to cure. In an alternative recipe, the meat strips are marinated with salt, sugar, and salitre (saltpetre), and pineapple juice may be added for a slightly tart flavor.

Tocino is traditionally boiled in water (just enough to cover the meat), fried in oil, or cooked over medium heat until the fat is rendered. The Kapampangans (kapampangan: Pindang) who make tocino by simmering it for four to six hours in order to achieve thickness and softness in the meat, then leave it overnight at room temperature before serving it as burong baboy (fermented pork).

Tocino is often served as the popular breakfast or lunchtime combination called tosilog, which name is a portmanteau of tocino, sinangág (garlic rice) and itlóg (egg, which is cooked either sunny-side up or scrambled).

== Caribbean ==
Tocino is cut into small squares and fried until crunchy and added to recipes like mofongo and arroz blanco con tocino, "white rice and tocino". In Cuba, it can be added to soft bread.

== Central America ==
In Nicaragua, tocino is prepared in a few ways. The most common is when it is marinated in achiote, naranja agria, and vinegar and then added to the Nacatamal. It cooks inside the nacatamal via vapor.

== United States ==
The Hormel Foods Corporation makes a Filipino tocino-flavored version of their SPAM product for sale in supermarkets.

== See also ==
- Cuisine of the Philippines
- Puerto Rican cuisine
- Longganisa
- Tapa
