= Kiampong =

Filipino glutinous rice casserole

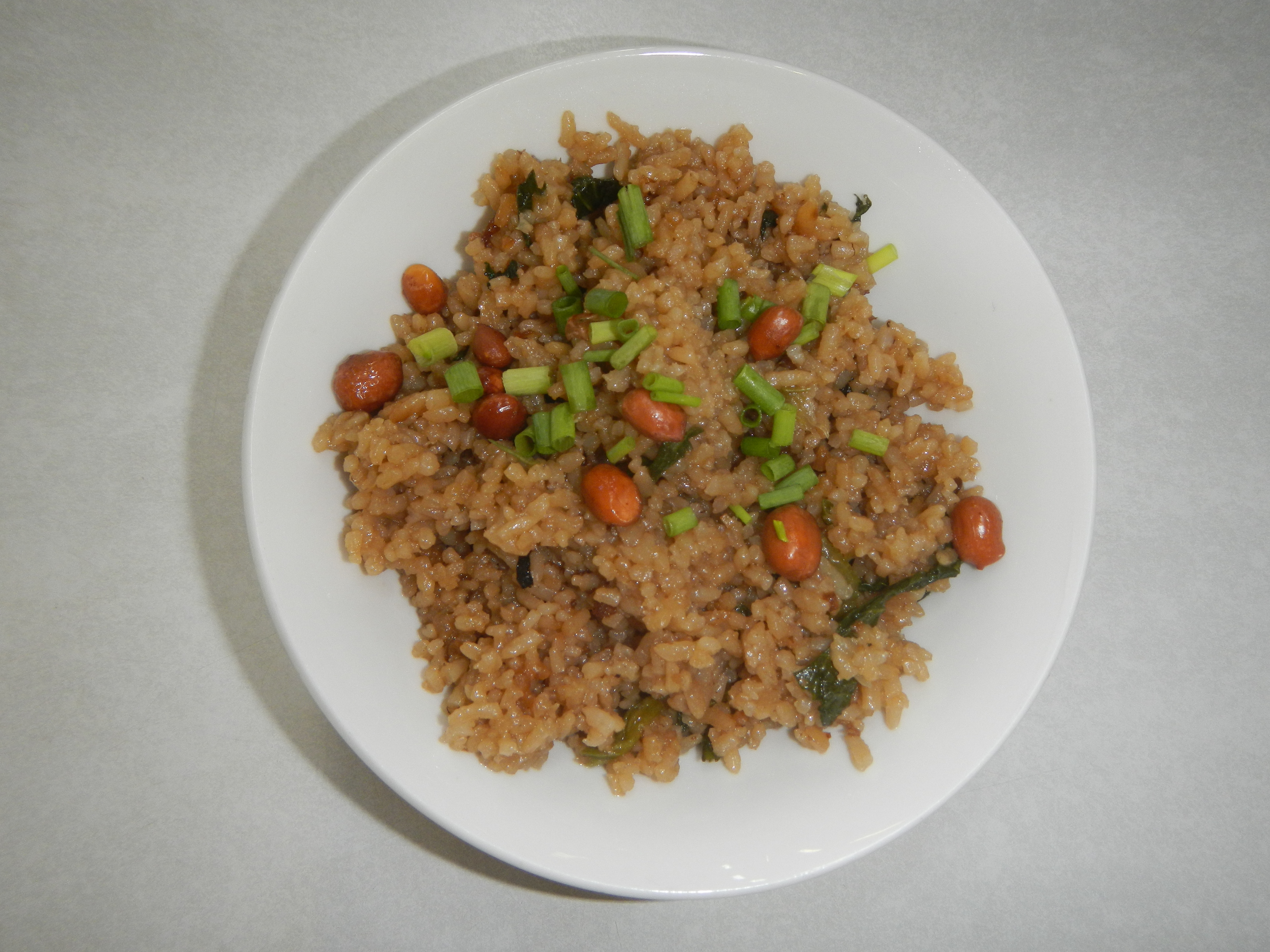
- Kiampong from Manila
- Alternative names: kiampung, kiam pung, kiampeng
- Course: Main dish
- Place of origin: Philippines
- Serving temperature: Hot
- Similar dishes: morisqueta tostada, sinangag

Kiampong, also spelled as kiampung or kiampeng, is a Filipino glutinous rice casserole. Its name originates from Philippine Hokkien for "salty rice" (Chinese: 鹹飯; Pe̍h-ōe-jī: kiâm-pn̄g). It is a common traditional dish for Chinese Filipino families. It has many variants, but typically comprise two steps in cooking. The meat (usually pork) and Chinese sausages are first cooked in a sauce similar to Philippine adobo with garlic, soy sauce, vinegar, sugar, and ground black pepper. Various vegetables (typically mustard greens) and root crops like taro can also be added, depending on the recipe. This is then added to a pot along with glutinous rice and mixed thoroughly before cooking the rice. Toasted nuts and scallions are added before serving.

== See also ==
- Morisqueta tostada
- Kuning
- List of casseroles
- Lugaw
- Sinangag
