= Tapa (Filipino cuisine) =

Dried or cured meat

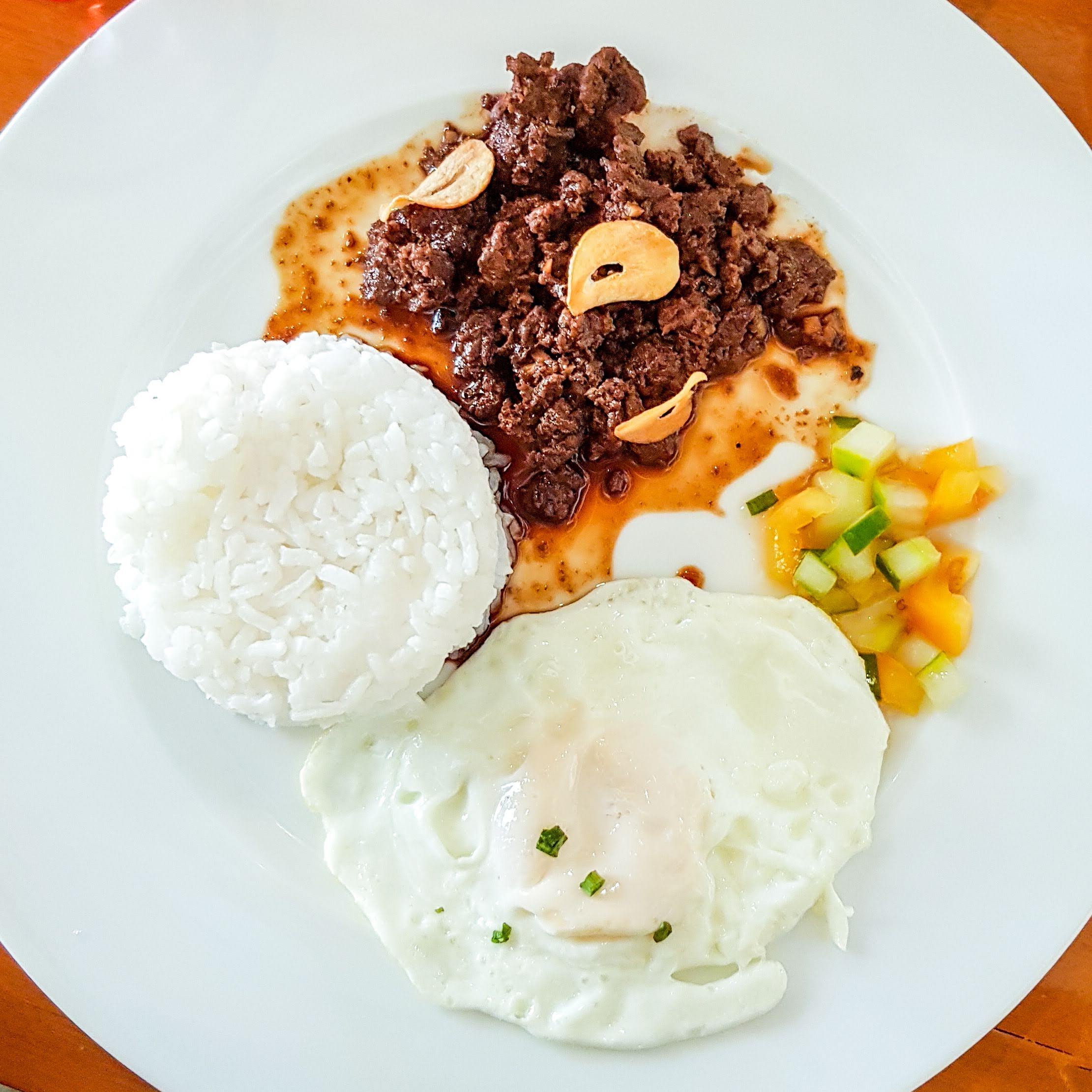
- Beef tapa with steamed rice, over easy fried egg and diced tomatoes and cucumbers
- Type: Meat
- Course: Main course
- Place of origin: Philippines
- Main ingredients: Beef, pork, chicken, or fish; salt and spices
- Variations: dried or cured

Tapa is dried or cured beef, pork, mutton, venison or horse meat, although other meat or even fish may be used. Filipinos prepare tapa by using thin slices of meat and curing them with salt and spices as a preservation method.

Tapa is often cooked, fried or grilled. When served with fried rice and fried egg, it is known as tapsilog, a portmanteau of the Tagalog words tapa, sinangag (fried rice) and itlog (egg). It sometimes comes with atchara, pickled papaya strips, or sliced tomatoes as a side dish. Vinegar or ketchup is usually used as a condiment.

== Etymology ==
Tapa in the Philippine languages originally meant fish or meat preserved by smoking. In the Spanish Philippines, it came to refer to meats also preserved by other means. It is derived from Proto-Malayo-Polynesian *tapa, which in turn is derived from Proto-Austronesian *Capa. Tinapa (literally "prepared by smoking") is another cognate, though it usually refers to smoked fish.

== Dishes ==
Before cooking tapa, the meat is cured or dried and cut into small portions, thick or thin slices. As a method of preservation, salt and spices are added. After preparation, the meat can be cooked either grilled or fried.

Just like any other ulam (main dish) in Filipino cuisine, tapa is usually paired with rice. It can be garlic rice, java rice, plain rice or any other type of preparation. As a side dish, tapa sometimes comes with atchara (pickled papaya strips) or sliced vegetables (usually tomatoes). Vinegar (oftentimes with siling labuyo) or banana ketchup is usually used as a condiment.

=== Tapsilog ===
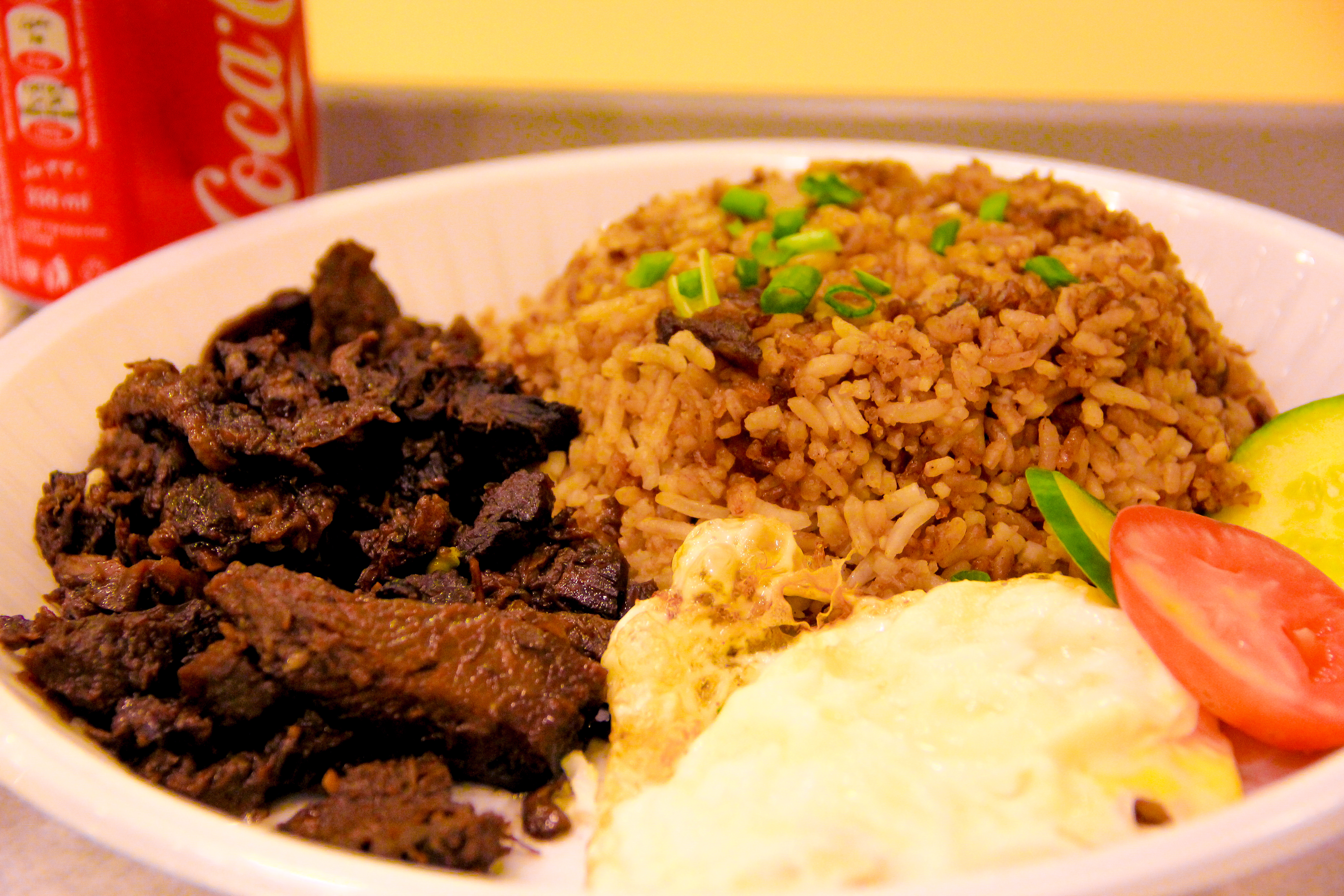
Tapsilog, a traditional Filipino breakfast combination with tapa, sinangag (garlic fried rice), and an egg omelet

Tapsilog is the term used when tapa, garlic-fried rice (sinangag), and fried egg (itlog) are combined into one meal, which is served primarily during breakfast. In Tagalog, a restaurant that primarily serves tapa is called a tapahan, tapsihan or tapsilugan.

“Tapsilog” is a contraction of tapa + sinangag + itlog, and “tapsihan” generally refers to a place where one can get tapsilog. While these terms may have originated as slang, they are now widely recognized and understood—especially in Metro Manila — and are commonly used by restaurants and Filipinos from all social strata.

==== Restaurants ====
Small restaurants called tapsihan (or tapsilogan) in many barangays in the Philippines serve tapsilog along with some of its variants (see silog). However, large business establishment chains in the Philippines, particularly some fast food chains and even most hotels, have already ventured into the selling of tapa and the tapsilog due to the popularity of this type of cuisine, including the tapsilog and its variants on their breakfast menus.

== See also ==
- Filipino cuisine
- List of Philippine dishes
- Tinapa
