= List of broccoli dishes =

This is a list of broccoli dishes and foods, which use broccoli either as a primary ingredient or a main ingredient. Broccoli (Brassica oleracea var. italica) is an edible green plant in the cabbage family (family Brassicaceae, genus Brassica) whose large flowering head, stalk and small associated leaves are eaten as a vegetable.

== Broccoli dishes ==
- Beef and broccoli - American Chinese dish.
- Broccoli-cheddar soup - with or without ham
- Broccoli muffins
- Broccoli quiche
- Chicken and broccoli - American Chinese dish.
- Cream of broccoli soup
- Salad - raw broccoli is a common ingredient both in green, vegetable salads and pasta salads.
- Steamed broccoli - a popular way to cook broccoli so it retains its vitamins and non-mineral nutrients. Served as a side to meat dishes, particularly fish.
- Stir-fry vegetables - originally a Chinese dish, similar to sautéing.
Broccoli dishes

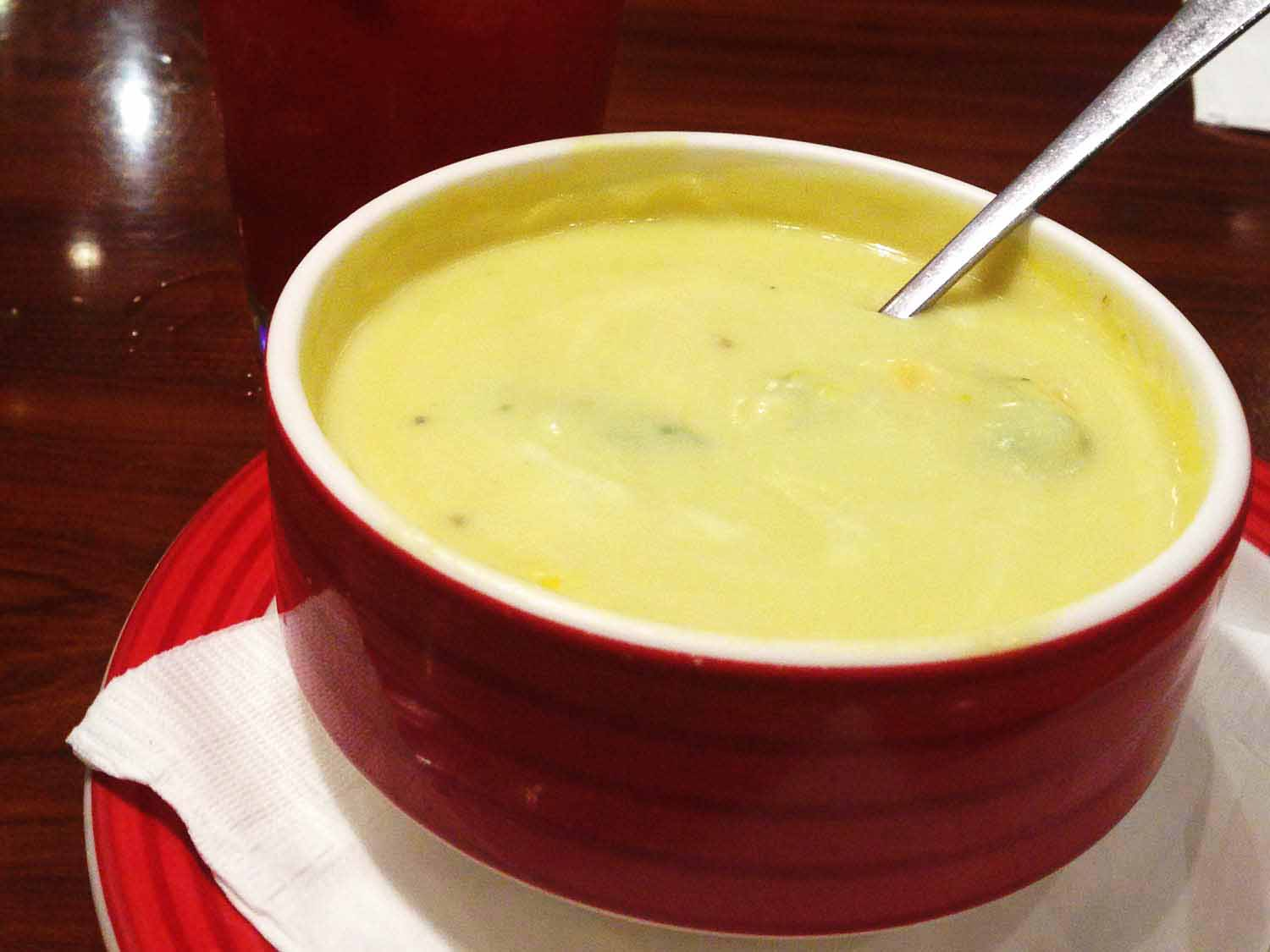
Broccoli cheese soup

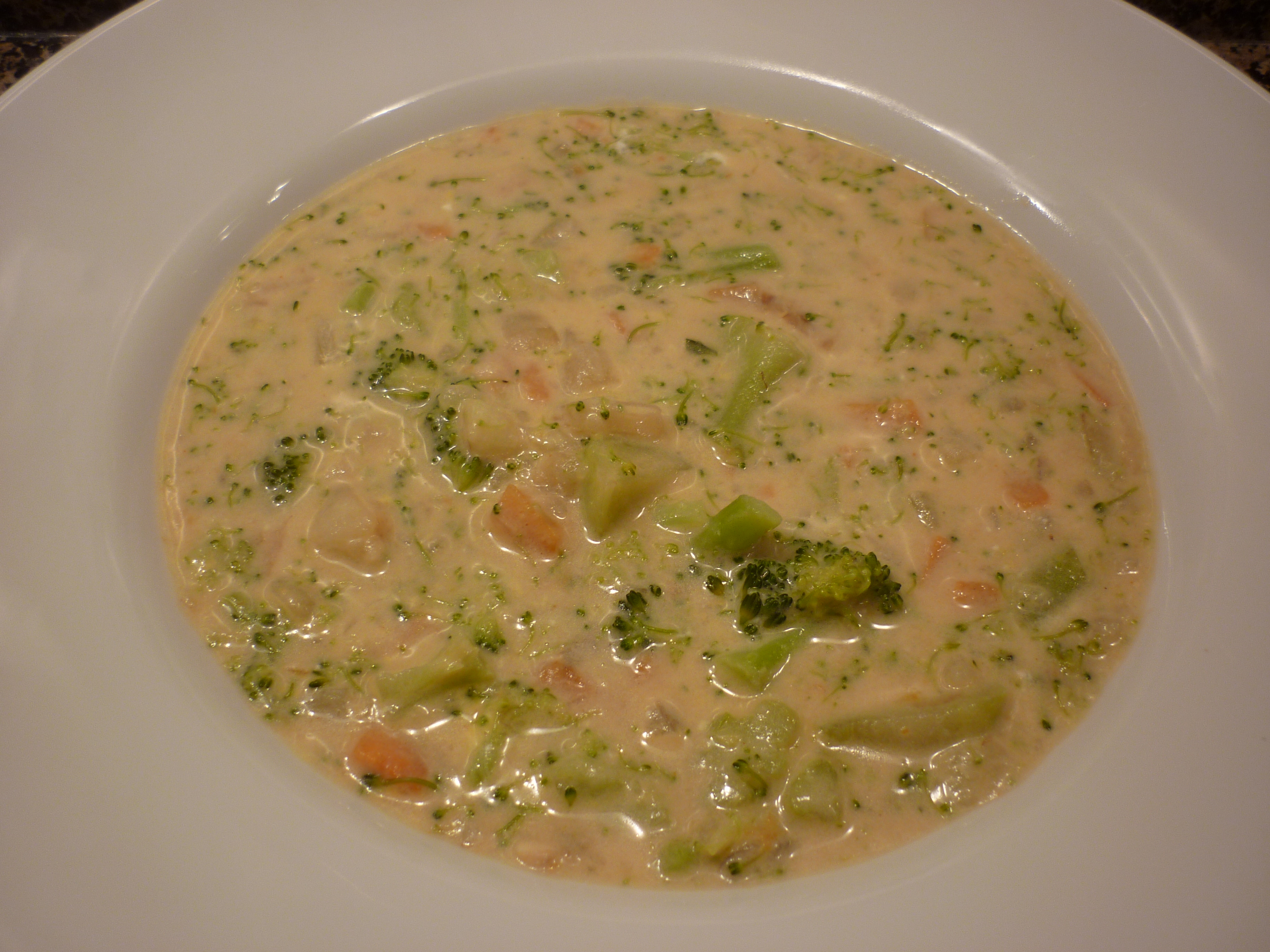
Broccoli cheese chowder

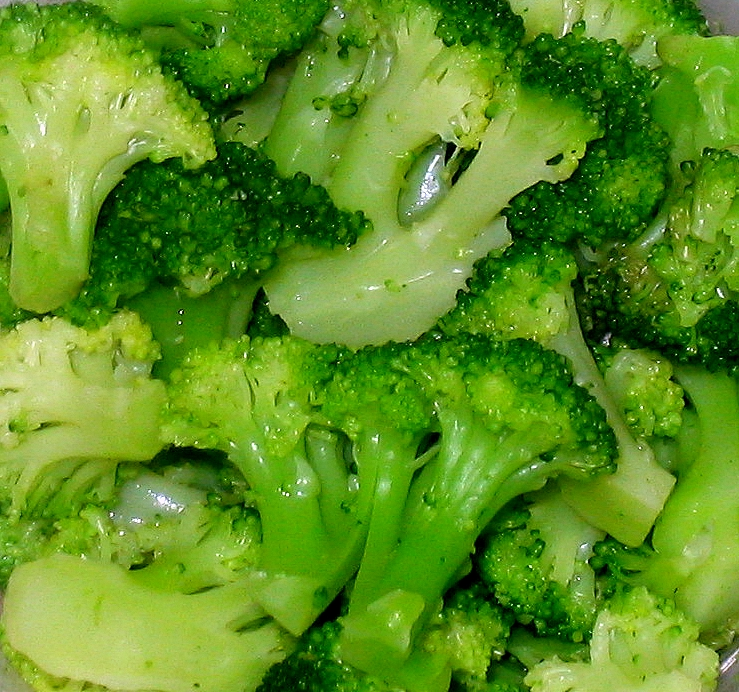
Steamed broccoli

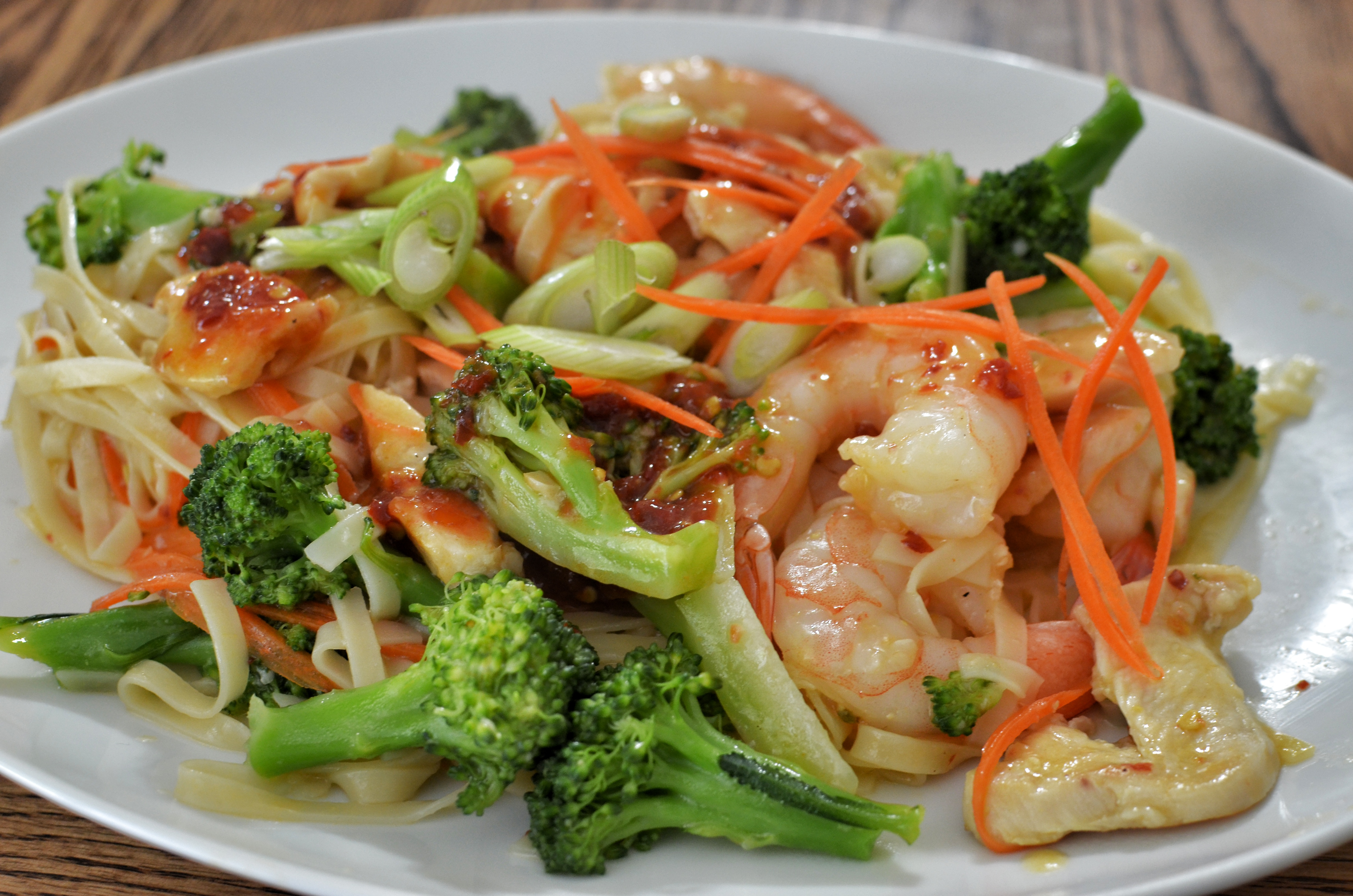
Noodle stir-fry with chicken, shrimp, and broccoli

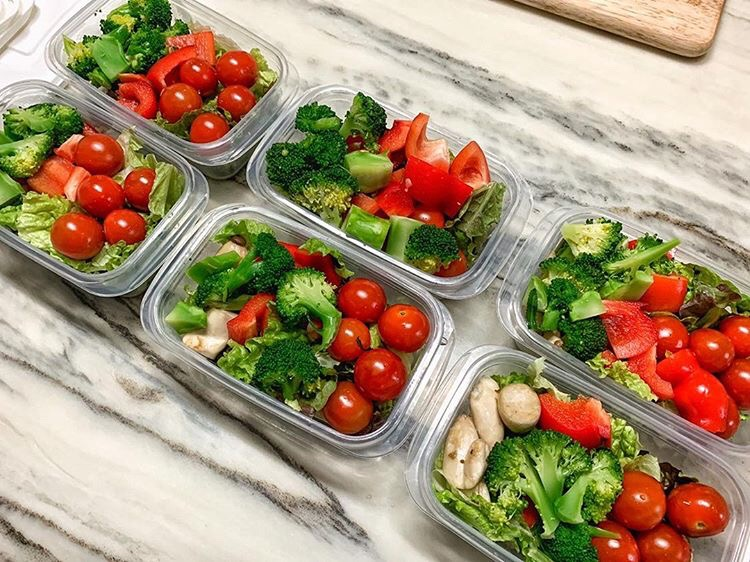
Salad with broccoli

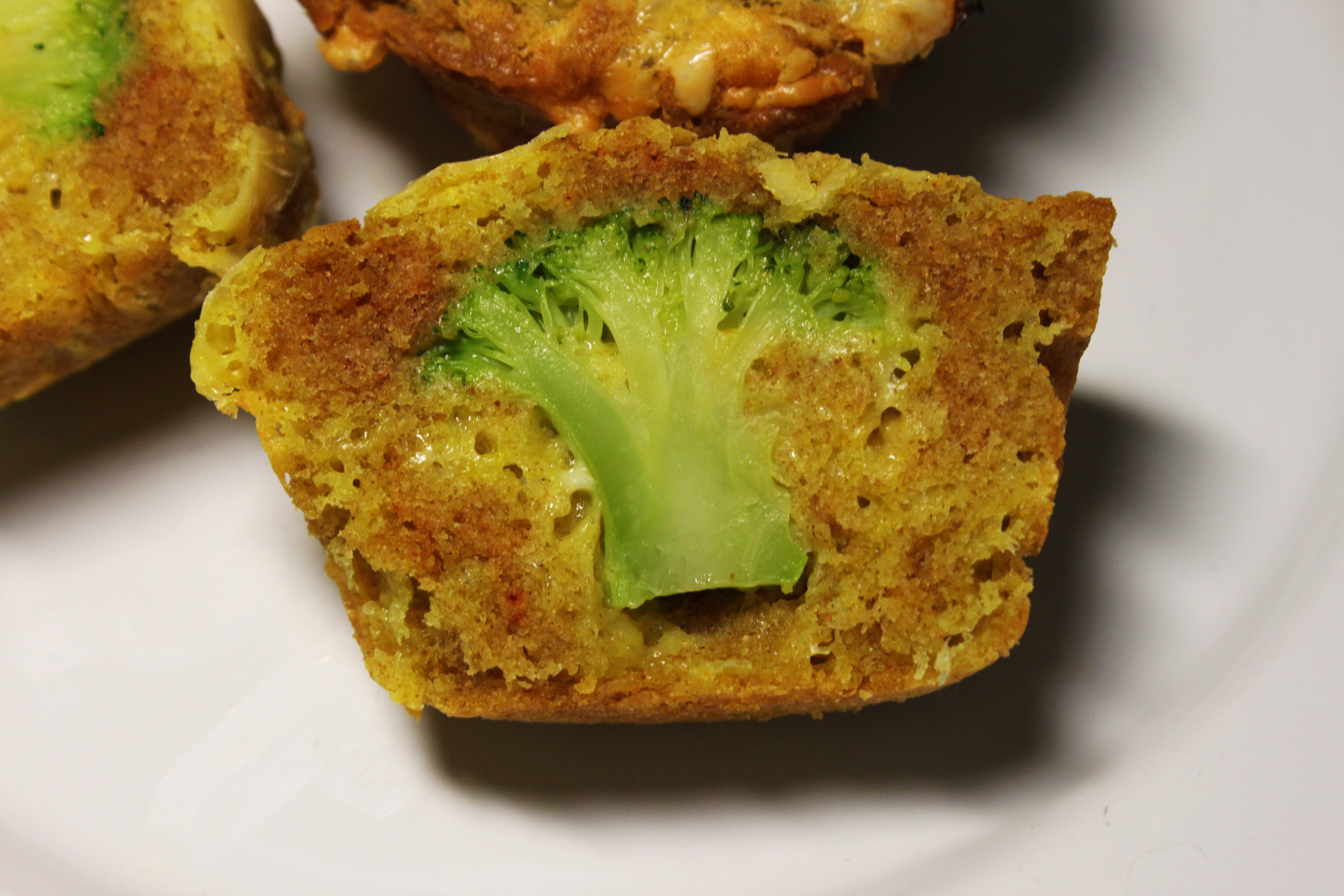
Broccoli Tree Muffins

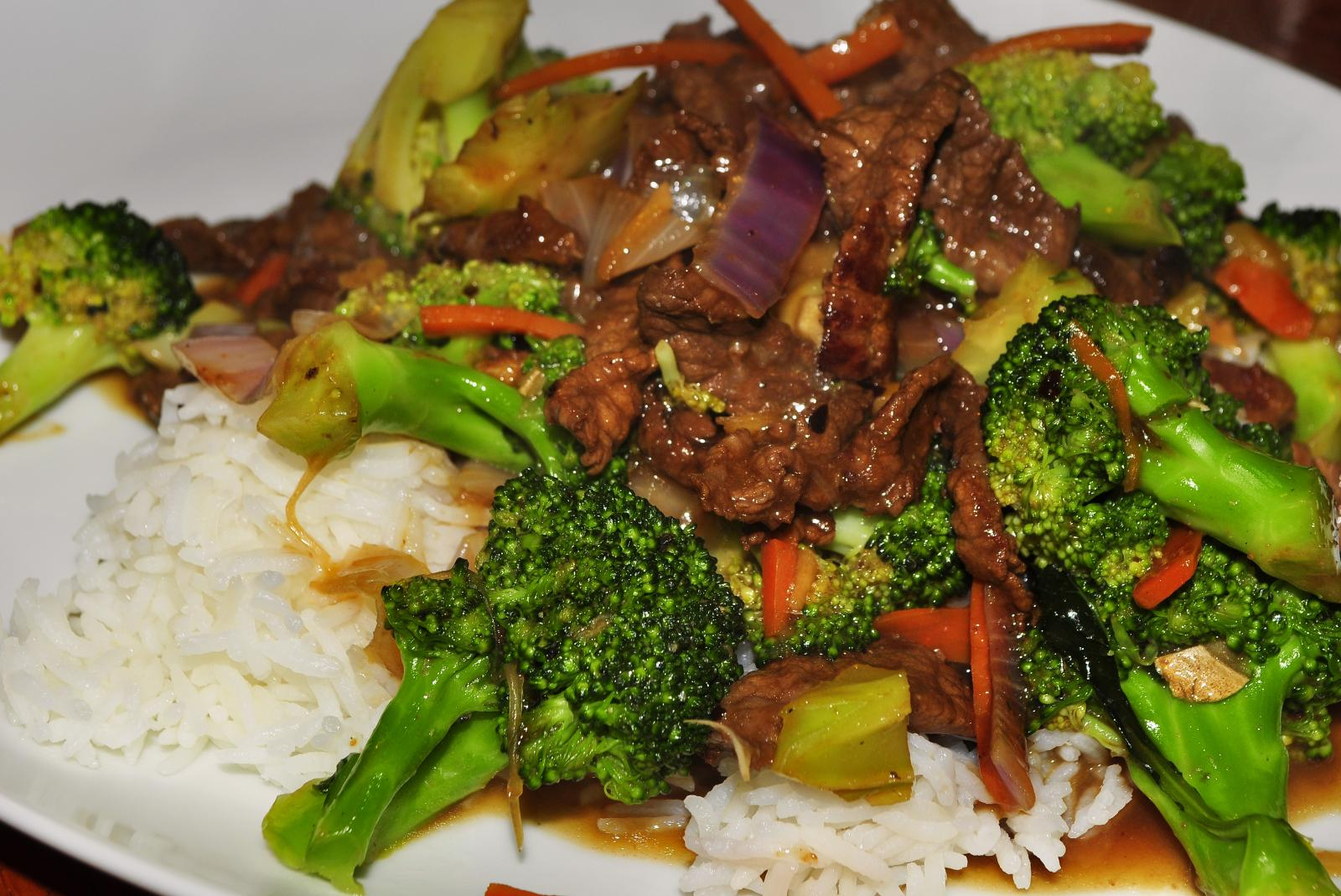
Broccoli beef on a rice bed

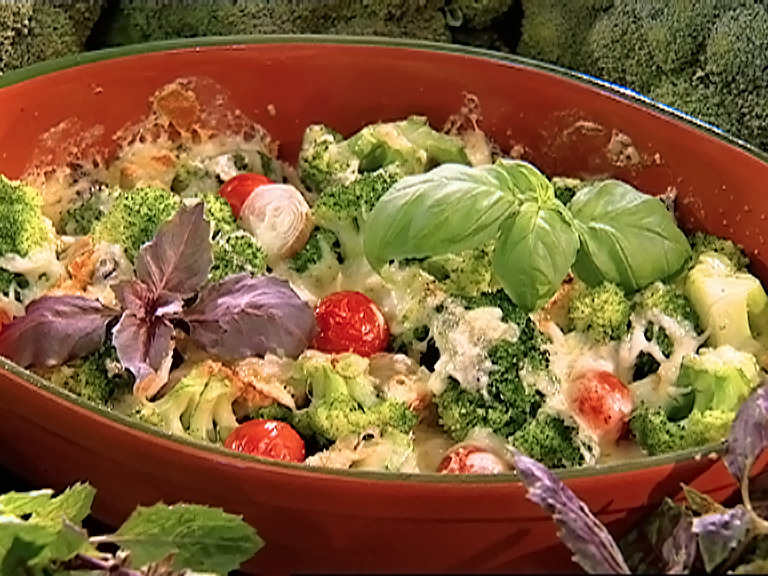
Broccoli gratine with three kinds of cheeses

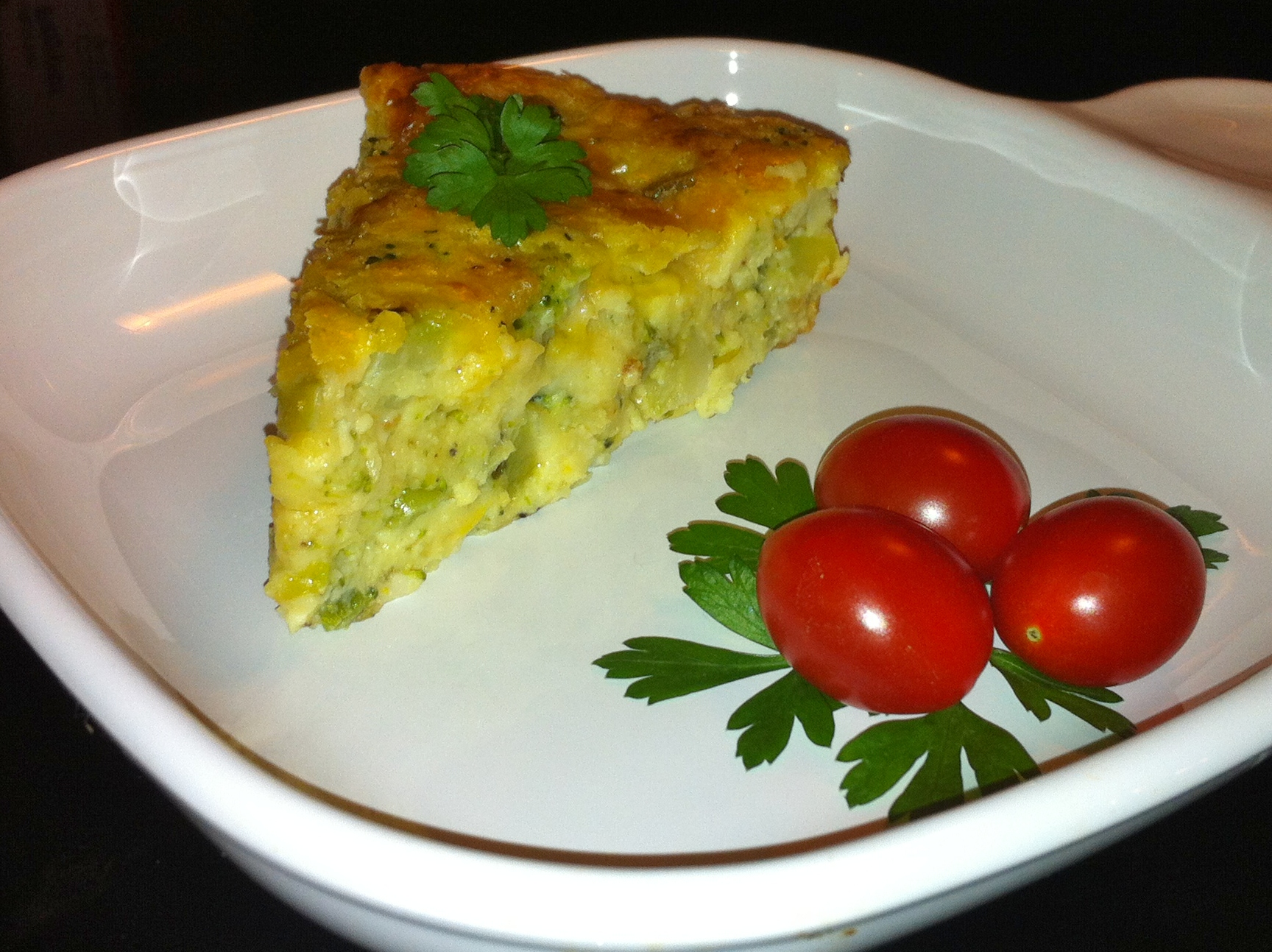
Broccoli Quiche

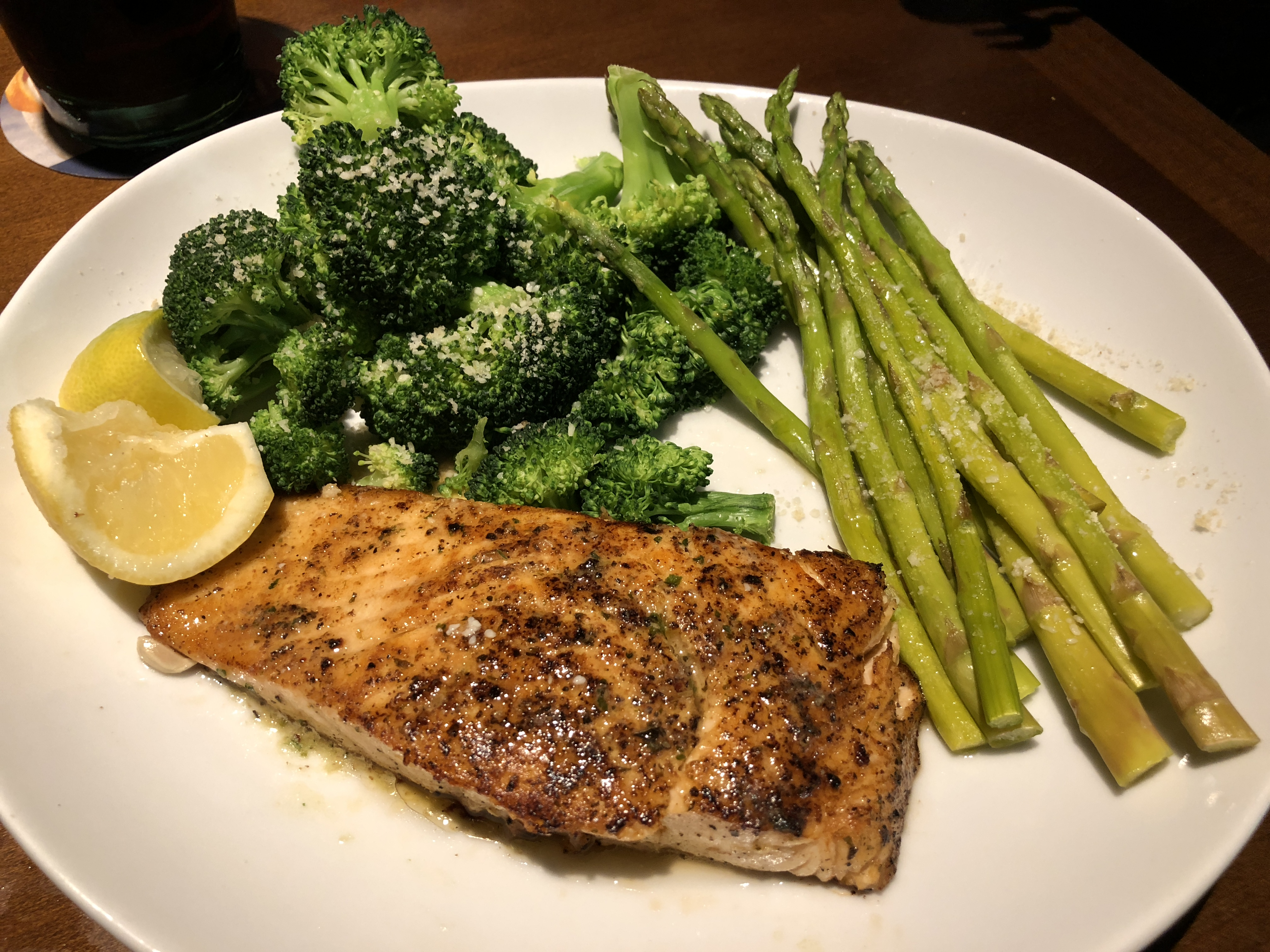
Herb-grilled salmon with side of asparagus and broccoli

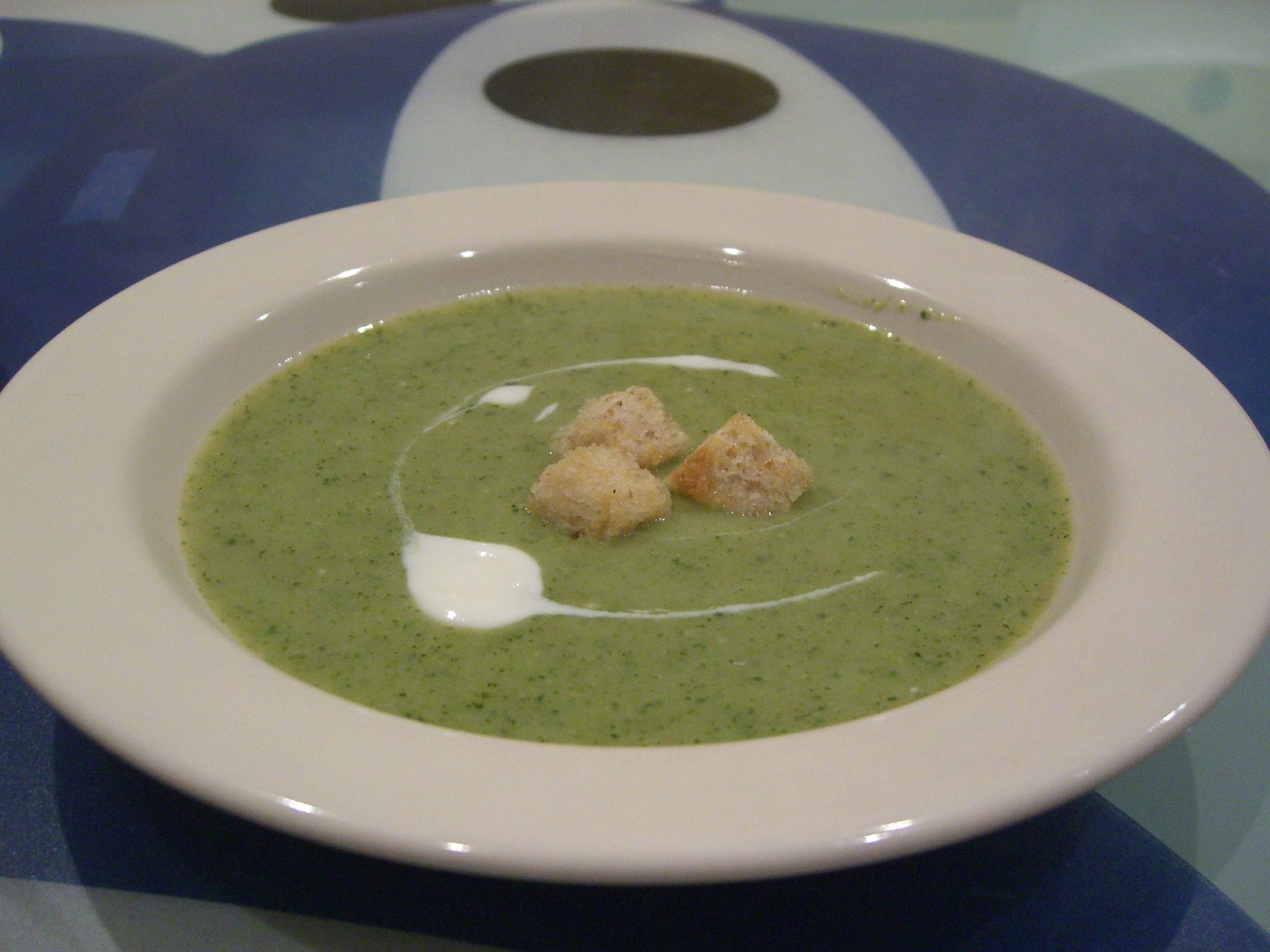
Broccoli soup

== See also ==
- Broccoli
- List of vegetable dishes
