= American Chinese cuisine =

Chinese cuisine developed by Chinese Americans

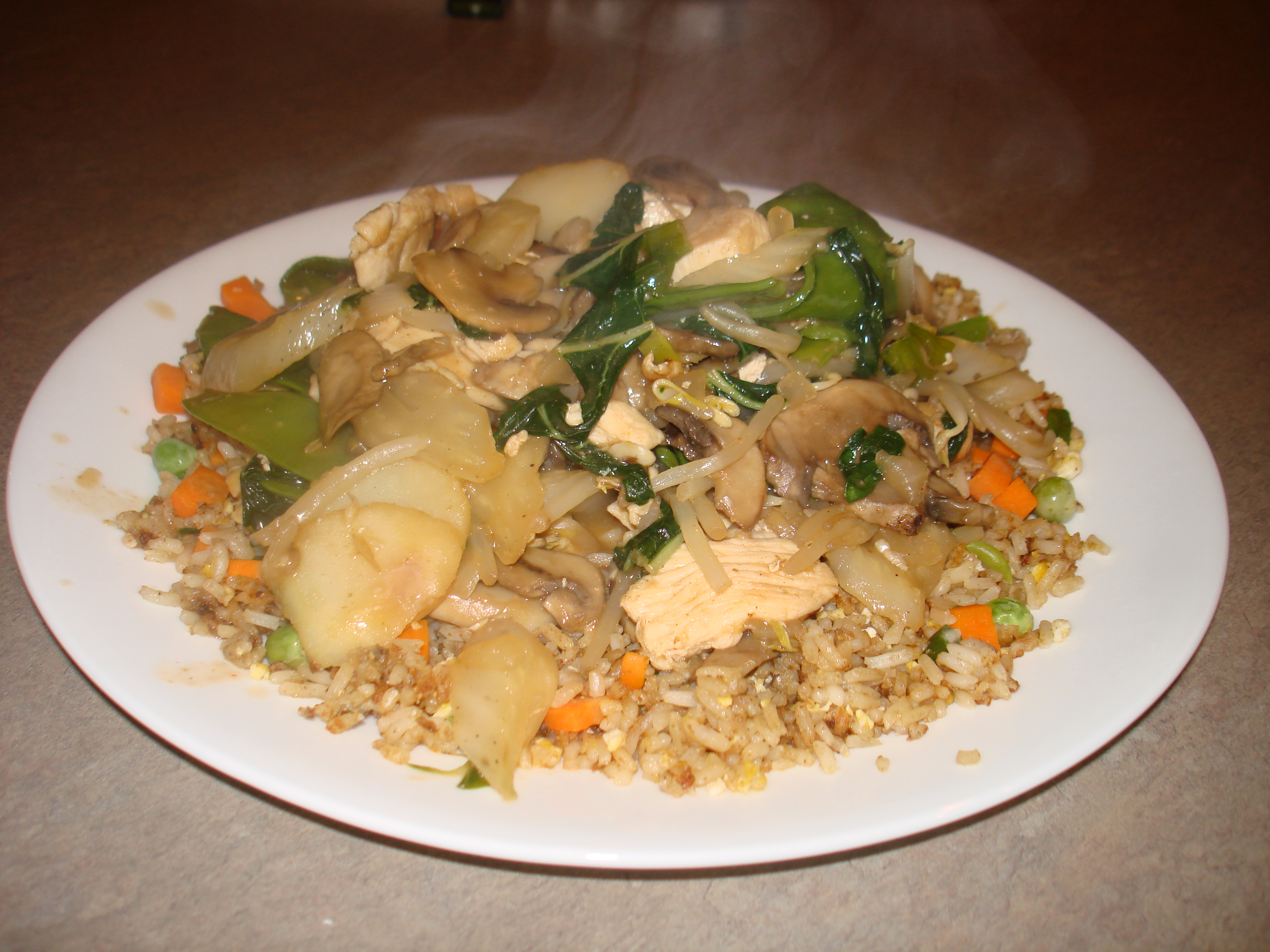
Chop suey, made with garlic chicken and peapods, on fried rice

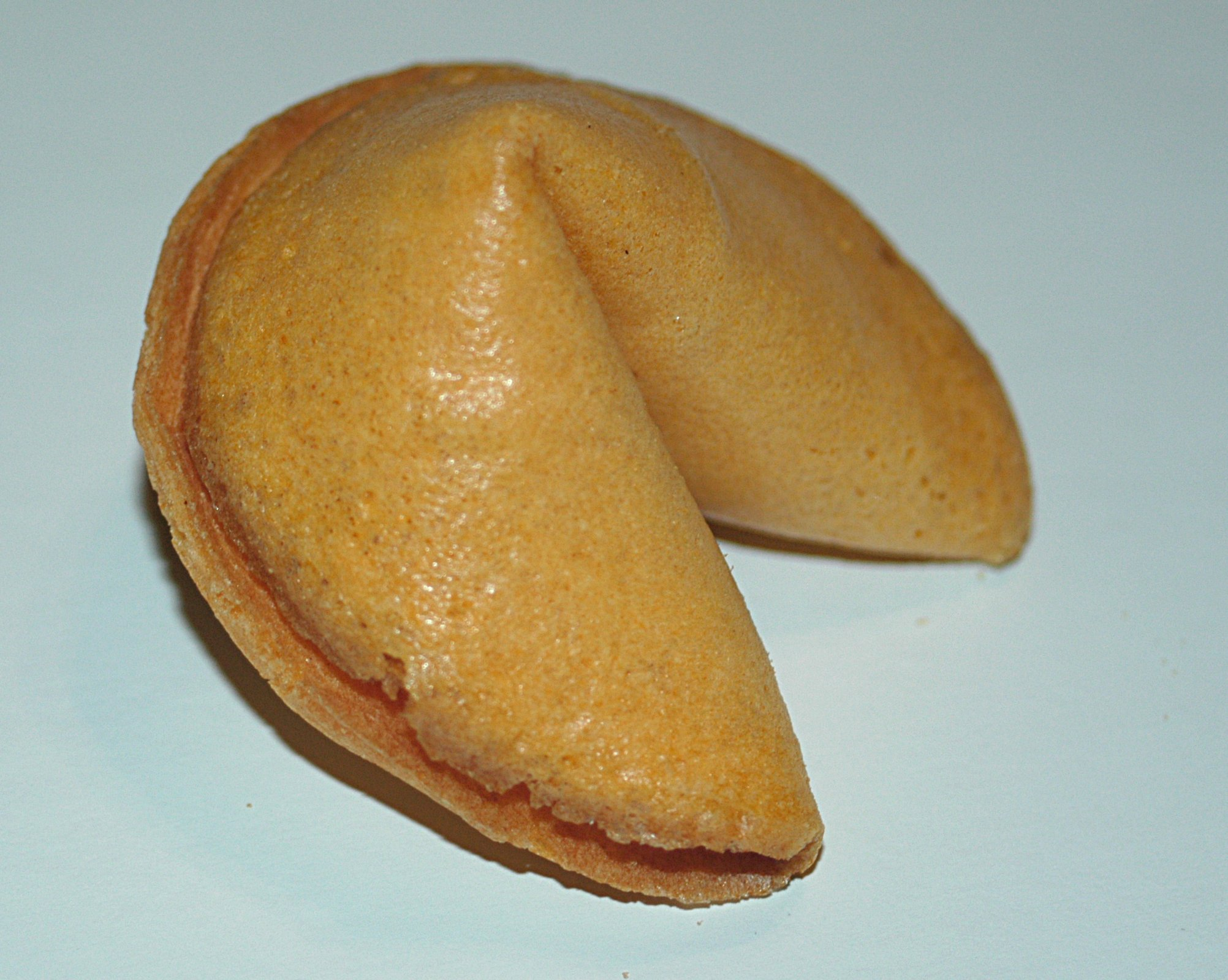
An unopened fortune cookie

American Chinese cuisine, also known as Sino-American cuisine and often referred to in American English as simply Chinese food, is a derivative of Chinese cuisine developed by Chinese Americans. The dishes served in North American Chinese restaurants are modified to suit customers' tastes and are often quite different from styles common in China. By the late 20th century, it was recognized as one of the many regional styles of Chinese cuisine.

== History ==
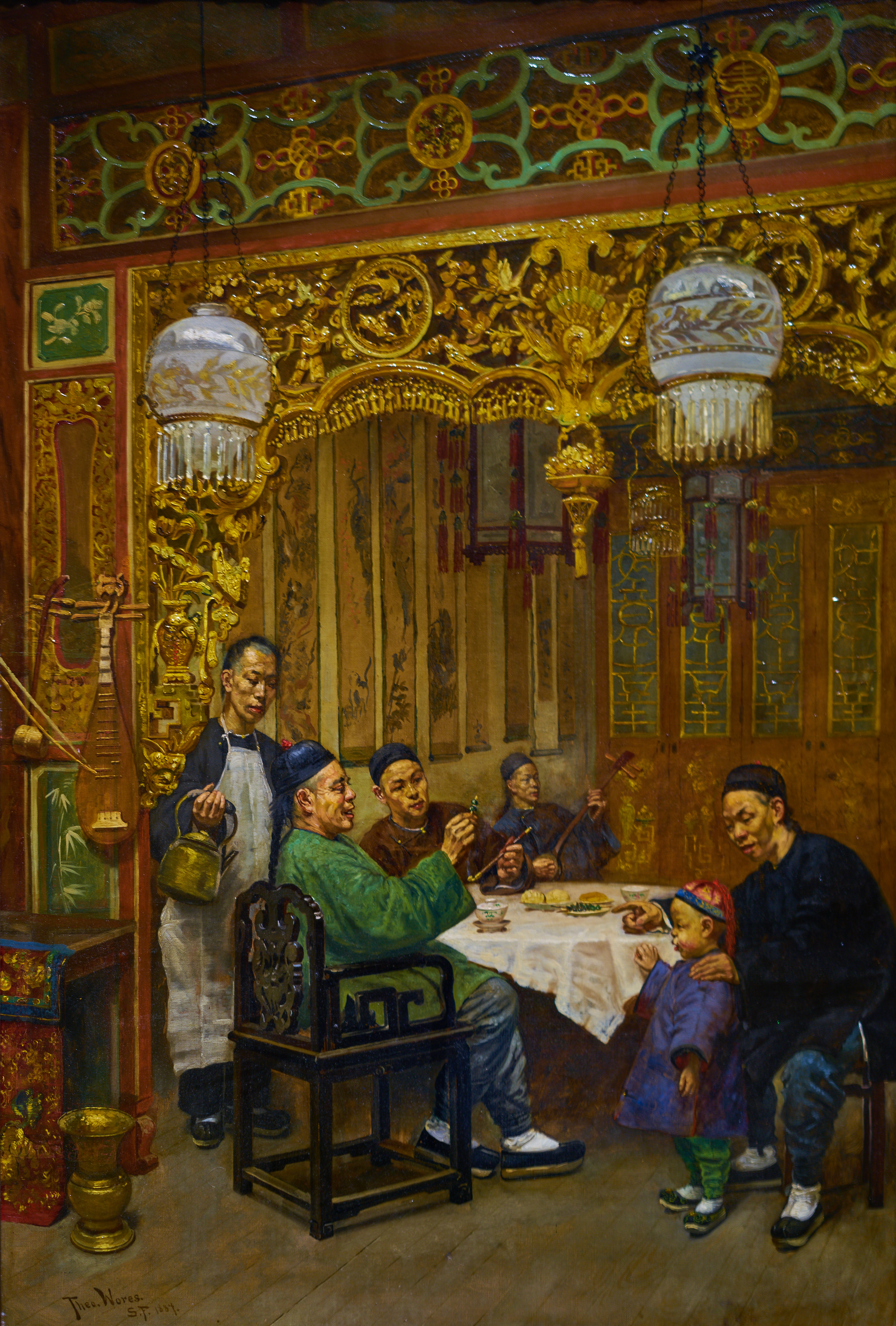
Theodore Wores, 1884, Chinese Restaurant, oil on canvas, 83 x 56 cm, Crocker Art Museum, Sacramento

American Chinese cuisine can be traced back to the California Gold Rush (1848–1855) when Chinese immigrants came in search of work as gold miners and railroad workers. As more Chinese arrived, the state introduced laws that prohibited immigrants from owning land. Chinese migrants therefore gathered in cities and started small businesses, including restaurants and laundry services. These smaller restaurants adapted Chinese food to suit the tastes of American customers, such as miners and railroad workers, serving a variety of dishes, ranging from pork chop sandwiches and apple pie to beans and eggs. They later opened restaurants in towns where Chinese food was completely unknown, using local ingredients and cooking procedures to adapt their customer preferences. By the late 19th century, Chinese Americans in San Francisco operated luxurious restaurants patronized mainly by Chinese customers. Many restaurant owners were self-taught family cooks who improvised cooking methods using whatever ingredients were available.

During the California Gold Rush, 20,000–30,000 immigrants from Canton (Guangdong province), China, arrived in California. The location of the first Chinese restaurant has sparked debate. Some say it was the Macau and Woosung restaurant buffet, while others cite the Canton Restaurant. Neither one of these restaurants have any surviving photographs; the only reliable information is that these two restaurants were founded in 1849 in San Francisco. Either way, these and other such restaurants were central features in the daily lives of Chinese immigrants. They provided a connection to home, particularly for the many bachelors who did not have the resources or knowledge to cook for themselves. These populations were substantial: In 1852, the ratio of male to female Chinese immigrants was 18:1. These restaurants served as gathering places and cultural centers for the Chinese community. By 1850, there were five Chinese restaurants in San Francisco. Soon after, significant amounts of food were being imported from China to America's west coast.

The trend spread steadily eastward with the development of the American railways, particularly to New York City. The Chinese Exclusion Act allowed merchants to enter the country, and in 1915, restaurant owners became eligible for merchant visas; these visas fueled the opening of Chinese restaurants as an immigration vehicle. The merchant status was based on the use of rotating managers. Restaurants would operate as a partnership among many people, rotating different partners through the management responsibilities and establishing them as merchants to earn the exemption.

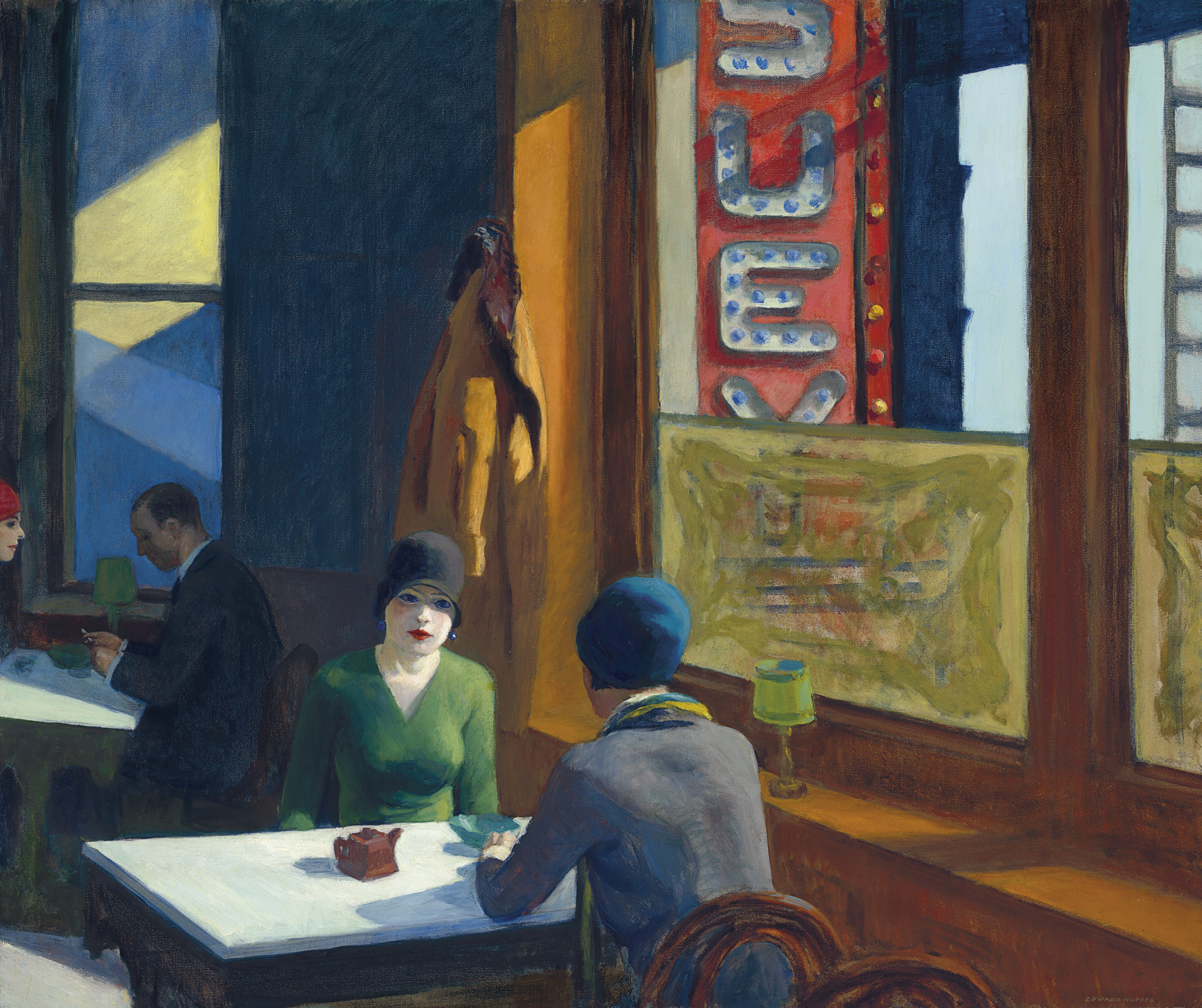
Edward Hopper's 1929 painting Chop Suey portrays a Chinese American restaurant in New York City

By the early decades of the 20th century, Chinese restaurants had brought new culinary ingredients to towns and cities across the United States, including soy sauce, sesame oil, bean sprouts, water chestnuts, dried mushrooms, fried noodles, Oolong tea and almond cookies. Bok choi, then called "Pak choi," was sometimes called "Chinese Romaine". Similarly, Napa cabbage was called "Chinese cabbage". In those years, it was commonplace for prosperous American families, especially on the West Coast, to employ Chinese cooks as domestic servants. For example, cookbook author and TV personality James Beard grew up in Portland, Oregon where his parents employed a Chinese cook, Jue-Let, whom Beard credited as a major culinary influence, and spoke of with great affection. In 1915, a manual was published in San Francisco, instructing Chinese immigrants how to cook for American families.

Along the way, cooks adapted southern Chinese dishes and developed a style of Chinese food not found in China, such as chop suey. Restaurants (along with Chinese laundries) provided an ethnic niche for small businesses at a time when Chinese people were excluded from most jobs in the wage economy by ethnic discrimination or lack of language fluency. By the 1920s, this cuisine, particularly chop suey, became popular among middle-class Americans. However, after World War II it began to be dismissed for not being "authentic," though it continued to be popular.

In 1955, the Republic of China (having itself retreated to Taiwan) evacuated the Dachen Islands. Many who escaped to Taiwan later moved to the United States as they lacked strong social networks and access to opportunities in Taiwan. Chefs from the Dachen Islands had a strong influence on American Chinese food.

Beginning in the 1970s, Taiwanese immigrants expanded American-Chinese cuisine beyond Cantonese cuisine to encompass dishes from many different regions of China as well as Japanese-inspired dishes.

Chinese-American restaurants played a key role in ushering in the era of take-out and delivery food in the United States. In New York City, delivery was pioneered in the 1970s by Empire Szechuan Gourmet Franchise, which hired Taiwanese students studying at Columbia University to do the work. Chinese American restaurants were among the first restaurants to use picture menus in the US.

Taiwanese immigration largely ended in the 1990s due to an economic boom and democratization in Taiwan. From the 1990s onward, immigrants from China once again made up the majority of cooks in American Chinese restaurants. There has been a consequential component of Chinese emigration of illegal origin, most notably Fuzhou people from Fujian and Wenzhounese from Zhejiang in mainland China, specifically destined to work in Chinese restaurants in New York City, beginning in the 1980s.

Adapting Chinese cooking techniques to local produce and tastes has led to the development of American Chinese cuisine. Many of the Chinese restaurant menus in the US are printed in Chinatown, Manhattan, which has a strong Chinese-American demographic.

Late 20th-century tastes have been more accommodating to domestic residents. By this time, it had become evident that Chinese restaurants no longer catered mainly to Chinese customers.

In 2011, the Smithsonian National Museum of American History displayed some of the historical background and cultural artifacts of American Chinese cuisine in its exhibit entitled, Sweet & Sour: A Look at the History of Chinese Food in the United States.

As of 2023, the United States had around 37,000 Chinese restaurants.

== Differences from other regional cuisines in China ==
Many of the dishes that are commonly recognized as "Chinese food" were actually developed in America and bear little resemblance to traditional Chinese cuisine. Examples include fortune cookies, crab rangoon, and General Tso's chicken, none of which originated in China. Instead, these dishes were crafted to suit American palates, often characterized by sweetness, bold sauces, and deep-fried dishes.

American Chinese cuisine has its roots in the culinary traditions of Chinese immigrants from Guangdong province, particularly the Toisan (Taishan) district, the origin of most Chinese immigration before the closure of immigration in 1924. These Chinese immigrants developed new cooking styles and used readily available ingredients. The type of Chinese-American cooking served in restaurants differed significantly from the food eaten in Chinese-American homes. Among various regional cuisines in China, Cantonese cuisine has had the most influence on the development of American Chinese food.

American Chinese food typically includes greater quantities of meat compared to traditional Chinese cuisine. An increasing number of American Chinese restaurants—including some upscale establishments—have begun to incorporate more authentic dishes in response to growing customer demand for traditional flavors. While Chinese cuisine frequently uses Asian leaf vegetables, like bok choy and gai-lan, American Chinese cuisine commonly utilizes ingredients rarely found in China. For instance, Western broccoli (Chinese: 西蘭; pinyin: xīlán) is used instead of Chinese broccoli (gai-lan, 芥蘭; jièlán).

Chinese ingredients previously considered "exotic" in North America have become more available over time, including fresh fruits and vegetables. For example, edible snow pea pods have become widely available, while the less-known dau miu (also called "pea sprouts," "pea pod stems," or "pea shoots") are increasingly appearing on menus and even in supermarkets in North America.

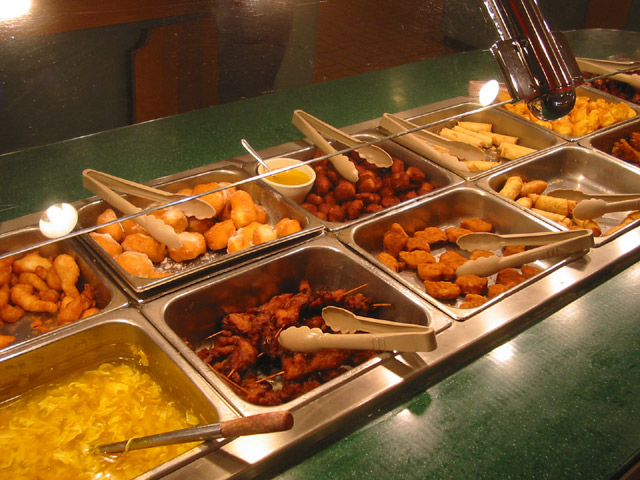
A Chinese buffet restaurant in the United States

American-Chinese food also has had a reputation for high levels of MSG, used to enhance flavor. From the early to mid-2000s through the 2010s and into the 2020s, market forces and customer preferences encouraged many restaurants to offer "MSG Free" or "No MSG" menus, or to omit this ingredient upon request.

However, discussions appearing around 2020 addressed that MSG's reputation has begun shifting, suggesting this trend had been developing for at least the past decade.

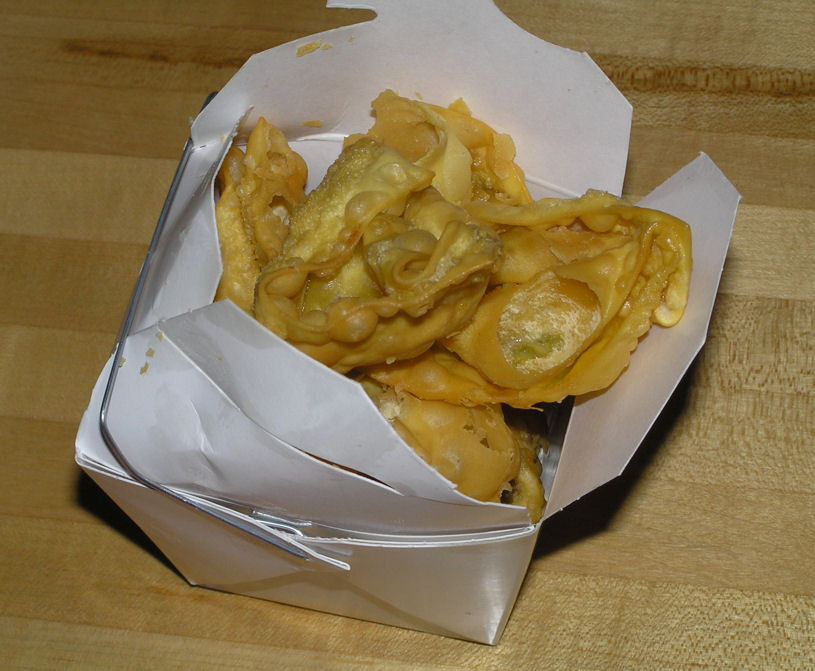
Carryout Chinese food is commonly served in a paper carton with a wire bail, known as an oyster pail.

A typical example to show how American Chinese cuisine differs from traditional Chinese food is egg fried rice. In American Chinese cuisine, egg fried rice often includes more soy sauce for additional flavor, whereas traditional egg fried rice uses much less soy sauce. Some culinary styles, such as dim sum, have also been modified to fit American tastes, including adding batter for fried dishes and using extra soy sauce.

Both traditional Chinese and American-Chinese cooking utilize similar methods of preparation, such as stir frying, pan frying, and deep frying, all of which can easily be performed using a wok.

Ming Tsai, chef and former owner of the Blue Ginger restaurant in Wellesley, Massachusetts, and host of PBS culinary show Simply Ming, has commented on the characteristics of American Chinese restaurants. He noted that these establishments often serve dishes representing three to five regions of China simultaneously, typically including items such as chop suey, various sweet and sour dishes, and an adaptation of chow mein or fried rice. Tsai described this style as: "Chinese-American cuisine as an adaptation of traditional Chinese food, modified to attract American customers by making it blander, thicker, and sweeter".

Most American Chinese primarily cater to non-Chinese customers, offering menus written in English accompanied by pictures. In some cases, separate menus (sometimes known as "phantom menus") written in Chinese are available, typically featuring traditional dishes offering ingredients such as liver, offal, chicken feet, or other meat items that might not appeal to non-Chinese customers. This is notably true among restaurants in Chinatown, Manhattan.

== Dishes ==
=== Menu items not found in China ===
Dishes that often appear on American Chinese restaurant menus include:

- Almond chicken — Chicken breaded in batter containing ground almonds, fried and served with almonds and onions.
- Chicken and broccoli — Similar to beef and broccoli, but with chicken instead of beef.
- Chinese chicken salad — Usually contains sliced or shredded chicken, uncooked leafy greens, carrots, cucumbers, crispy noodles (or fried wonton skins) and sesame dressing. Some versions include mandarin oranges.
- Chop suey — Derived from a term meaning "assorted pieces" in Chinese. It typically consists of vegetables and meat in a brown sauce but can also be served in a white sauce.
- Crab rangoon — Fried wonton skins stuffed with (usually) artificial crab meat (surimi) and cream cheese.
- Fortune cookie — Invented in California as a Westernized version of the Japanese omikuji senbei, fortune cookies have since become sweetened.
- Fried wontons — Somewhat similar to crab rangoon, a filling (most often pork) is wrapped in a wonton skin and deep-fried.
- General Tso's chicken — Chunks of chicken that are dipped in batter, deep fried, and seasoned with ginger, garlic, sesame oil, scallions, and hot chili peppers. This dish was named after Qing dynasty statesman and military leader Zuo Zongtang, often referred to as General Tso.
- Mongolian beef — Fried beef with scallions or white onions in a spicy and often sweet brown sauce.
- Royal beef—Deep-fried sliced beef, doused in a wine sauce and often served with steamed broccoli.
- Sesame chicken — Marinated, battered, and deep-fried chicken which is then dressed with a translucent red or orange, sweet and mildly spicy sauce, made from soy sauce, corn starch, vinegar, chicken broth, and sugar, and topped with sesame seeds.

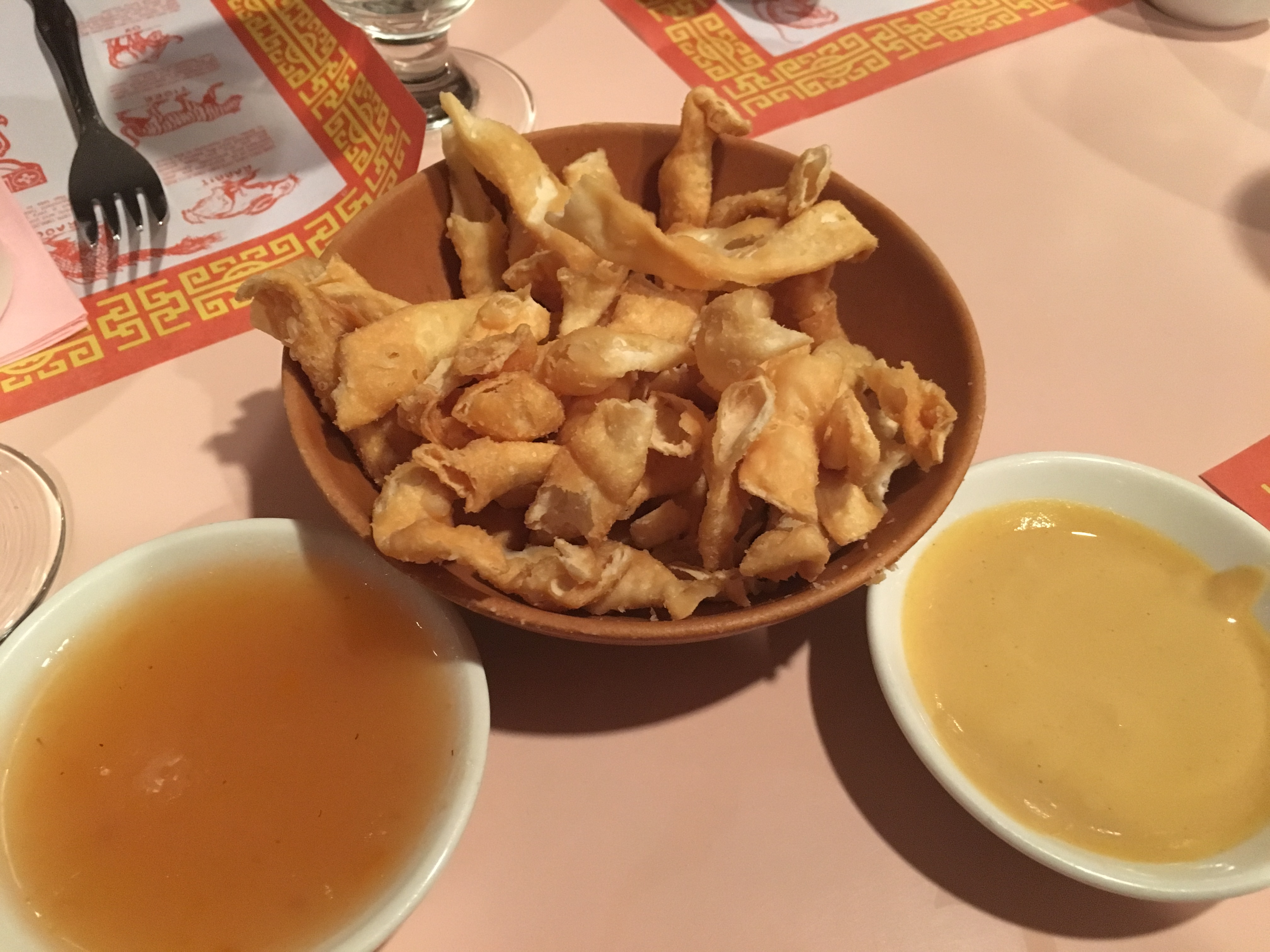
Wonton strips are commonly served as complimentary appetizers along with duck sauce and hot mustard

- Sushi — despite being served in the Japanese and American styles, some American Chinese restaurants serve various types of sushi, usually on buffets.
- Sweet roll — yeast rolls, typically fried, covered in granulated sugar or powdered sugar. Some variants are stuffed with cream cheese or icing.
- Wonton strips — these deep-fried strips of dough are commonly offered as complimentary appetizers, along with duck sauce and hot mustard, or with soup when ordering take-out.

=== Versions of dishes also found in China ===
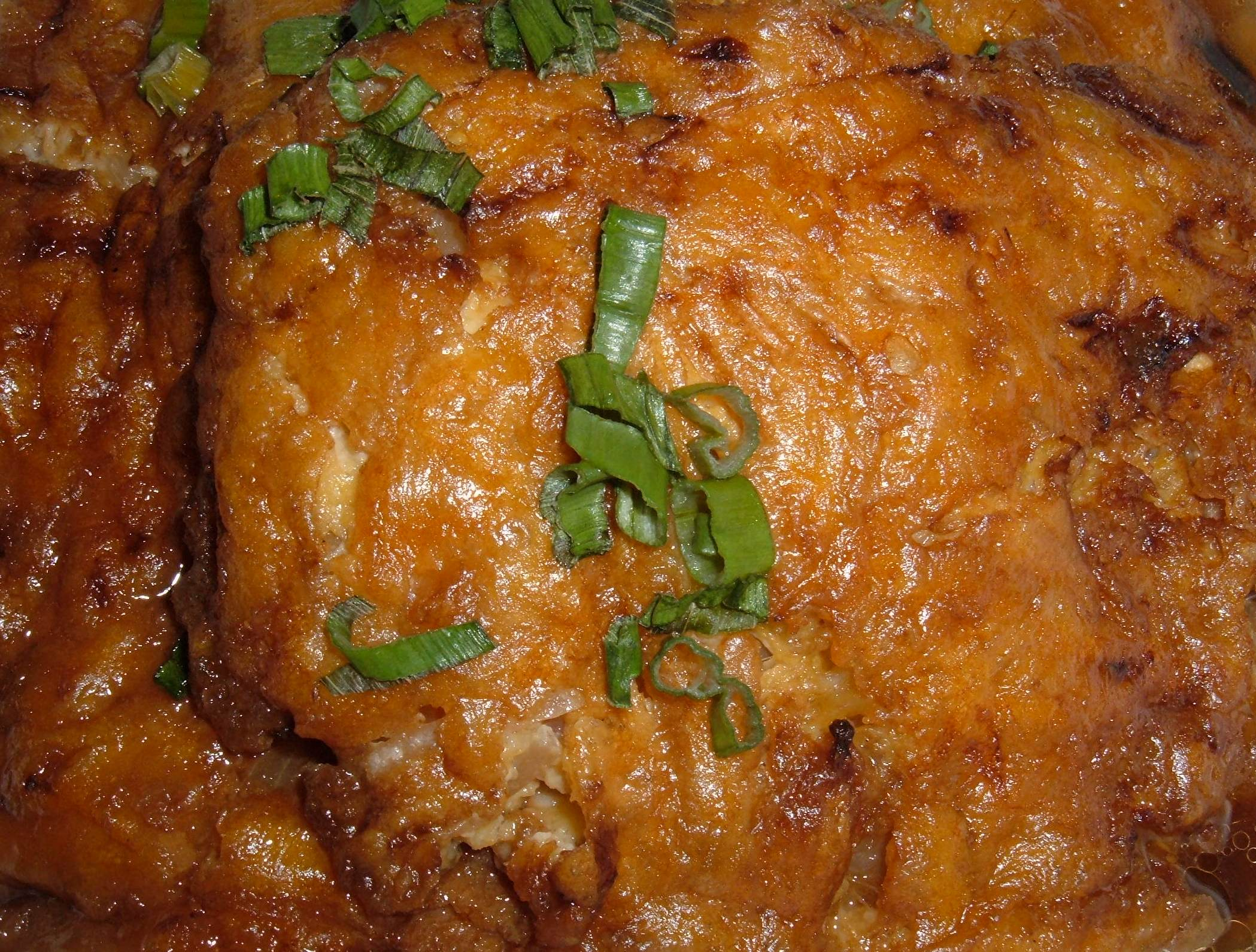
Egg foo young

- Beijing beef — in China, this dish uses gai lan (Chinese broccoli) rather than American broccoli.
- Beef and broccoli — flank steak cut into small pieces, stir-fried with broccoli, and covered in a dark sauce made with soy sauce and oyster sauce and thickened with cornstarch.
- Cashew chicken — stir-fried tender chicken pieces with cashew nuts.
- Chow mein — literally means "stir-fried noodles". Chow mein consists of fried crispy noodles with bits of meat and vegetables. It can come with chicken, pork, shrimp or beef.
- Egg foo young — Chinese-style omelet with vegetables and meat, usually served with a brown gravy. While some restaurants in North America deep-fry the omelet, versions found in Asia are more likely to be fried in the wok.
- Egg roll — while spring rolls have a thin, light beige crispy skin that flakes apart, and is filled with mushrooms, bamboo, and other vegetables inside, the American-style egg roll has a thicker, chewier, dark brown bubbly skin stuffed with cabbage and usually bits of meat or seafood (such as pork or shrimp), but no egg. In some regions, a filling of shredded and dried celery replaces cabbage, resulting in a more greenish tinge to the filling.
- Fried rice — fried-rice dishes are popular offerings in American Chinese food due to the speed and ease of preparation and their appeal to American tastes. It is commonly prepared with rice cooled overnight, allowing restaurants to put leftover rice to good use (freshly cooked rice is actually less suitable for fried rice). The American-Chinese version of this dish typically uses more soy sauce than the versions found in China, and it's offered with different combinations of meat (pork, chicken, shrimp ) and vegetables.
- Ginger beef (生薑牛肉; shēngjiāng niúròu) — tender beef cut in chunks, mixed with ginger and Chinese mixed vegetables.
- Ginger Fried Beef (乾炒牛肉絲; gānchǎo niúròu-sī) — tender beef cut in strings, battered, deep fried, then re-fried in a wok mixed with a sweet sauce, a variation of a popular Northern Chinese dish.
- Hulatang — a traditional Chinese soup with hot spices, often called "spicy soup" on menus.
- Hot and sour soup — the North American soups tend to have starch added as a thickener.
- Kung Pao chicken — a spicy Sichuan dish that is served with peanuts, scallions, and Sichuan peppers. Some versions in North America may include zucchini and bell peppers.
- Lemon chicken — a dish from Hong Kong cuisine, consisting of chopped, battered, fried chicken with a sweet lemon-flavored sauce.
- Lo mein ("stirred noodles") — frequently made with eggs and flour, making them chewier than a recipe simply using water. Thick, spaghetti-shaped noodles are pan fried with vegetables (mainly bok choy and Chinese cabbage or napa) and meat. Sometimes this dish is referred to as chow mein (which literally means "stir-fried noodles" in Cantonese).
- Mei fun — noodles usually simmered in broth with other ingredients such as fish balls, beef balls or slices of fishcake.
- Moo shu pork — the original version uses more typically Chinese ingredients (including wood ear fungi and daylily buds) and thin flour pancakes, while the American version often uses vegetables more familiar to Americans, and thicker pancakes. This dish is quite popular in Chinese restaurants in the United States, but not as popular in China.
- Orange chicken — battered chicken pieces with a sweet orange-flavored chili sauce that is thickened and glazed. Its connection to mainland Chinese cuisine is debated: it may be of purely American-Chinese origin, or it may be loosely based on a Hunanese dish that consists of stir-fried chicken in a light, slightly sweet soy sauce flavored with dried tangerine or orange peels.
- Pepper steak — originally a Fujian dish made with pork (a somewhat similar dish also exists in Hunan cuisine), the American Chinese recipe consists of sliced steak, green bell peppers, tomatoes, and white or green onions stir fried with salt, sugar, and soy sauce. Bean sprouts are a less common addition.
- Sweet and sour pork — a typical version in American Chinese restaurants consists of heavily battered pork fritters served with a side of bright red sweet and sour sauce. (Chicken and shrimp variants are often available.) Other versions are closer to the Cantonese original, with more thinly-battered pork pieces tossed in a subtly red sauce.
- Wonton soup — in most American Chinese restaurants, only wonton dumplings in broth are served, while versions found in China may come with noodles. (In Guangdong, it can be a full meal in itself, consisting of thin egg noodles and several pork and prawn wontons in a pork or chicken soup broth or noodle broth). Especially in takeout restaurants, wonton are often made with thicker dough skins, to withstand the rigors of delivery.

== Regional variations ==
=== New York City ===
The New York metropolitan area is home to the largest Chinese population outside of Asia, which also constitutes the largest metropolitan Asian-American group in the United States and the largest Asian-national metropolitan diaspora in the Western Hemisphere. The Chinese-American population of the New York City metropolitan area was an estimated 893,697 as of 2017.

Many regional Chinese cuisines are available in New York City, including Hakka, Taiwanese, Shanghainese, Hunanese, Szechuan, Cantonese, Fujianese, Xinjiang, Zhejiang, and Korean Chinese cuisine. The Dongbei cuisine of Northeast China is also available in Flushing, Queens, as well as Mongolian cuisine and Uyghur cuisine.

==== Kosher preparation ====
Kosher preparation of Chinese food is also widely available in New York City, given the metropolitan area's large Jewish and particularly Orthodox Jewish populations.

Eating Chinese food on Christmas Day has become a widely noted tradition among American Jews. The tradition may have arisen from the lack of other open restaurants on Christmas Day, the close proximity of Jewish and Chinese immigrants in New York City, and the absence of dairy foods combined with meat.

Kosher Chinese food is usually prepared in New York City, as well as in other large cities with Orthodox Jewish neighborhoods, under strict rabbinical supervision as a prerequisite for Kosher certification.

=== Los Angeles County ===
Chinese populations in Los Angeles represent at least 21 of the 34 provincial-level administrative units of China, along with the largest population of Taiwanese-born immigrants outside of Taiwan, making greater Los Angeles home to a diverse population of Chinese people in the United States.

Chinese-American cuisine in the Greater Los Angeles area is concentrated in Chinese ethnoburbs rather than traditional Chinatowns. The oldest Chinese ethnoburb is Monterey Park, considered to be the nation's first suburban Chinatown.

Although Chinatown in Los Angeles is still a significant commercial center for Chinese immigrants, the majority are centered in the San Gabriel Valley which is one of the largest concentration of Asian-Americans in the country, stretching from Monterey Park into the cities of Alhambra, San Gabriel, Rosemead, San Marino, South Pasadena, West Covina, Walnut, City of Industry, Diamond Bar, Arcadia, and Temple City.

The Valley Boulevard corridor is the main artery of Chinese restaurants in the San Gabriel Valley. Another hub with a significant Chinese population is Irvine (Orange County). More than 200,000 Chinese Americans live in the San Gabriel Valley alone, with over 67% being foreign-born. The valley has become a brand-name tourist destination in China, although droughts in California are creating a difficult impact upon its water security and existential viability. Of the ten cities in the United States with the highest proportions of Chinese Americans, the top eight are located in the San Gabriel Valley, making it one of the largest concentrated hubs for Chinese Americans in North America.

Some regional styles of Chinese cuisine include Beijing, Chengdu, Chongqing, Dalian, Hangzhou, Hong Kong, Hunan, Mongolian, Nanjing, Shanghai, Shanxi, Shenyang, Wuxi, Xinjiang, Yunnan, and Wuhan.

LA is also home to notable food critics, including food blogger David R. Chan, who has visited more than 8000 Chinese restaurants, including hundreds around Los Angeles.

=== San Francisco Bay Area ===
Since the early 1990s, many American Chinese restaurants influenced by California cuisine have opened in the San Francisco Bay Area. The trademark dishes of American Chinese cuisine remain on the menu, but there is more emphasis on fresh vegetables, and the selection is vegetarian-friendly.

This new cuisine has exotic ingredients like mangos and portobello mushrooms. Brown rice is often offered as an alternative to white rice.

Some restaurants substitute grilled wheat flour tortillas for the rice pancakes in mu shu dishes. This substitution occurs even in some restaurants that are not typically associated with Chinese cuisine, including both Westernized and the more authentic places. For example, a Mexican bakery that supplies some restaurants with thinner tortillas made for use with mu shu. However, this trend is not always appreciated by Mu shu purists.

In addition, many restaurants serving more native-style Chinese cuisines exist, due to the high numbers and proportion of ethnic Chinese in the San Francisco Bay Area.

Restaurants specializing in Cantonese, Sichuanese, Hunanese, Northern Chinese, Shanghainese, Taiwanese, and Hong Kong traditions are widely available, as are more specialized restaurants such as seafood restaurants, Hong Kong-style diners and cafes, also known as Cha chaan teng (茶餐廳; chácāntīng), dim sum teahouses, and hot pot restaurants. Many Chinatown areas also feature Chinese bakeries, boba milk tea shops, roasted meat, vegetarian cuisine, and specialized dessert shops.

However, one of the most common American Chinese dishes, Chop suey, is not widely available in San Francisco, and the area's chow mein is different from Midwestern chow mein.

=== Boston ===
Chinese cuisine in Boston results from a combination of economic and regional factors, in association with the wide Chinese academic scene. The growing Boston Chinatown accommodates Chinese-owned bus lines shuttling an increasing number of passengers to and from the numerous Chinatowns in New York City, and this has led to some exchange between Boston Chinese cuisine and that in New York.

A large Fujianese immigrant population has made a home in Boston, leading to Fuzhou cuisine being readily available there. An increasing Vietnamese population has also had an influence on Chinese cuisine in Greater Boston.

In addition, dishes incorporating chow mein and chop suey as well as locally farmed produce and regionally procured seafood are found in Chinese as well as non-Chinese restaurants in and around Boston. The selection of Chinese baked products has increased in the 21st century.

Joyce Chen introduced northern Chinese and Shanghainese dishes to Boston in the 1950s, including Peking duck, moo shu pork, hot and sour soup, and potstickers, which she called "Peking Ravioli" or "Ravs". Her restaurants were frequented by early pioneers of the ARPANET, as well as celebrities such as John Kenneth Galbraith, James Beard, Julia Child, Henry Kissinger, Beverly Sills, and Danny Kaye. A former Harvard University president called her eating establishment "not merely a restaurant, but a cultural exchange center". In addition, her single-season PBS national television series Joyce Chen Cooks popularized some dishes which could be made at home, and she often encouraged using substitute ingredients when necessary.

=== Philadelphia ===
The evolving American Chinese cuisine scene in Philadelphia has similarities with the situation in both New York City and Boston. As with Boston, Philadelphia is experiencing significant Chinese immigration from New York City, 95 miles (153 km) to the north, and from China, the top country of birth by a significant margin for a new arrivals there .

There is a growing Fujianese community in Philadelphia as well, and Fuzhou cuisine is readily available in the Philadelphia Chinatown. Also, emerging Vietnamese cuisine in Philadelphia is contributing to evolution in local Chinese cuisine, with some Chinese-American restaurants adopting Vietnamese influences or recipes.

=== Washington, D.C. ===
Although Washington, D.C.'s Chinese community has not achieved as high of a local profile as that in other major cities along the Mid-Atlantic United States, it is now growing, and rapidly so, due to the gentrification of DC's Chinatown and the status of Washington, D.C., as the capital of the United States. The growing Chinese community in D.C. and its suburbs has revitalized the influence of Chinese cuisine in the area.

Washington, D.C.'s population is 1% Chinese, making them the largest single Asian ancestry in the city. However, the Chinese community in the D.C. area is no longer solely concentrated in the area of Chinatown, which is about 15% Chinese and 25% Asian, but is mostly concentrated throughout various towns in suburban Maryland and Northern Virginia. The largest concentration of Chinese and Taiwanese in the D.C. area is in Rockville, Maryland, in Montgomery County.

A popular dish localized in Chinese American carryouts across the DMV region consists of whole fried chicken wings served with mumbo sauce, a sweet, tangy ketchup-based condiment.

In D.C. proper, there are Chinese-owned restaurants specializing in both Chinese American and authentic Chinese cuisine. Regional variations of Chinese cuisine that restaurants in D.C. specialize in include Shanghainese cuisine, Cantonese cuisine, Uyghur cuisine, Mongolian cuisine, and Sichuan cuisine. In the suburbs of D.C. in Maryland and Virginia, many of which have a much higher Chinese population than D.C., regional variations present aside from the ones previously mentioned include Hong Kong cuisine, Hunan cuisine, Shaanxi cuisine, Taiwanese cuisine, and Yunnan cuisine.

=== Puerto Rico ===
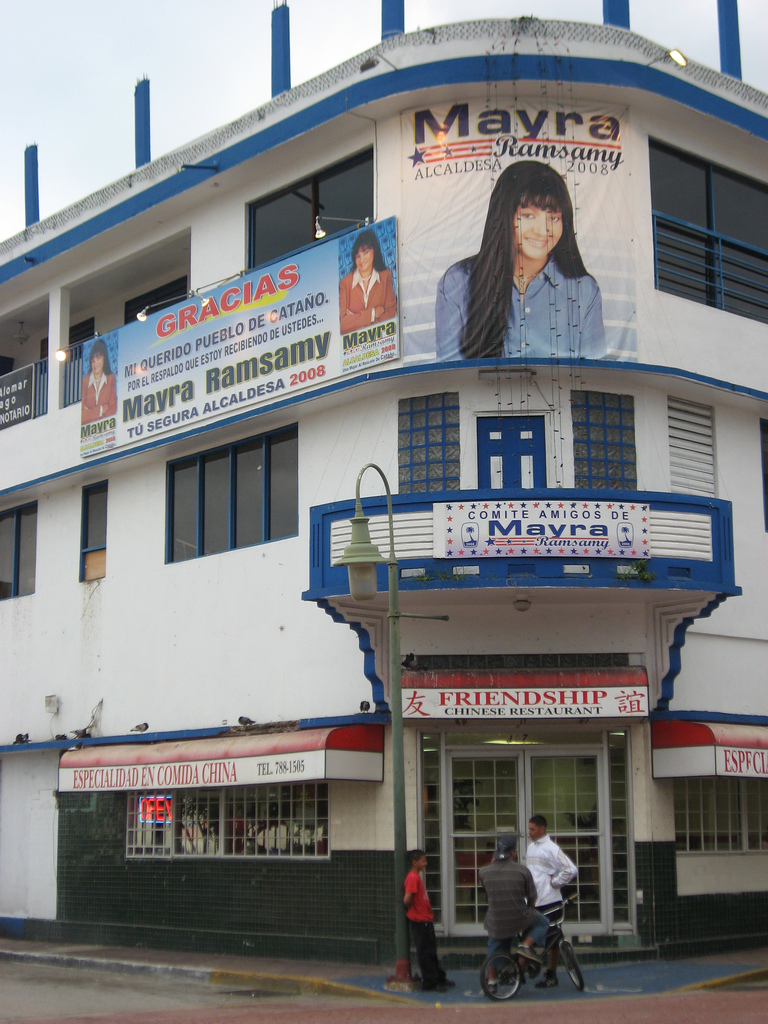
Chinese restaurant in Cataño

Puerto Rican Chinese cuisine (Spanish: Cocina china puertorriqueña) is a popular style of food exclusive to restaurants in Puerto Rico developed by its Chinese immigrants. The food is a variation of Cantonese cuisine with some elements of Puerto Rican cuisine. A typical dish consists of fried rice, a choice of meat, and French fries or tostones. The fried rice itself varies in every restaurant but can contain many ingredients such as ham, beef, shrimp, egg, lettuce, and onions. In 2020, there were an estimated 450 Chinese restaurants in Puerto Rico.

=== Hawaii ===
Hawaiian-Chinese food developed somewhat differently from Chinese cuisine in the continental United States.

Owing to the diversity of Pacific ethnicities in Hawaii and the history of the Chinese influence in Hawaii, resident Chinese cuisine forms a component of the cuisine of Hawaii, which is a fusion of different culinary traditions. Some Chinese dishes are typically served as part of plate lunches in Hawaii.

The names of foods are different as well, such as Manapua, from the Hawaiian contraction of "Mea ono pua'a" or "delicious pork item" from the dim sum bao, though the meat is not necessarily pork.

=== Other regions ===
- Chow mein sandwich — sandwich of chow mein and gravy (Southeastern Massachusetts and Rhode Island)
- Chop suey sandwich — sandwich of chicken chop suey on a hamburger bun (North Shore of Massachusetts)
- St. Paul sandwich — egg foo young patty in plain white sandwich bread (St. Louis, Missouri)
- Springfield-style cashew chicken — a style of cashew chicken that combines breaded deep-fried chicken, cashew nuts, and oyster sauce (Springfield, Missouri)
- War/wor sue gai (boneless almond chicken) — bite-sized Southern-style fried chicken with yellow sauce (Columbus, Ohio)
- Yaka mein — Chinese-Creole food found in New Orleans that evolved from beef noodle soup

== Chain restaurants ==
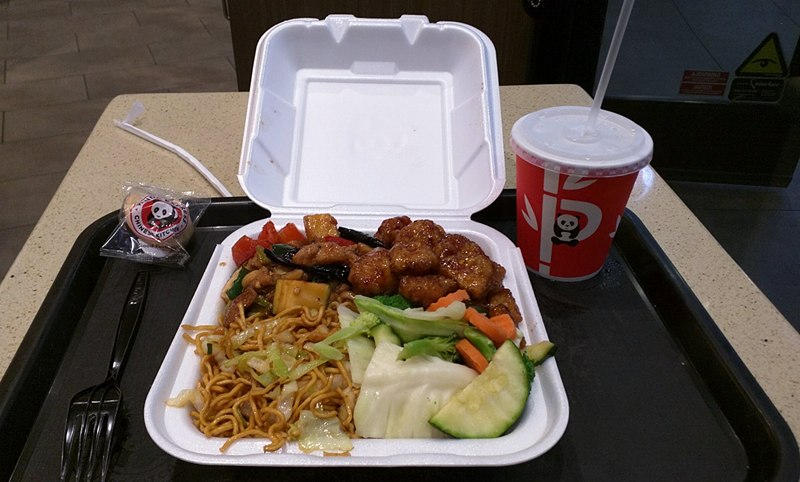
A typical Panda Express meal: Kung Pao chicken, orange chicken, chow mein and steamed vegetables

- China Coast — closed in 1995; owned by General Mills Corporation, formerly 52 locations throughout the United States
- Leeann Chin — Minnesota and North Dakota; owned at one time by General Mills Corp.
- Manchu Wok — throughout the United States and Canada, as well as Guam, Korea and Japan
- Panda Express — throughout North America (including Canada and Mexico), plus locations in Asia and the Middle East
- Pei Wei Asian Diner — throughout the United States; formerly a subsidiary of P.F. Chang's
- P. F. Chang's China Bistro — throughout the United States; featuring California-Chinese fusion cuisine
- Pick Up Stix — California, Arizona, and Nevada
- Stir Crazy — Illinois, Missouri, Wisconsin, Minnesota, New York, Florida, Indiana, Texas, and Ohio. Stir Crazy has faced closures in recent years. As of 2025, its operational status is uncertain, and it may have ceased operations.

== Popular culture ==
Many American films (for example, The Godfather, Ghostbusters, The Lost Boys, The Naked Gun, Crossing Delancey, Paid in Full, and Inside Out) include scenes where Chinese take-out food is eaten from oyster pails. A running gag in Dallas is character Cliff Barnes' fondness for inexpensive Chinese take-out food, in contrast to his nemesis J. R. Ewing, who frequents fine restaurants.

Numerous American television series and films have featured Chinese restaurants as settings, including A Christmas Story, Seinfeld (particularly the episode "The Chinese Restaurant"), Sex and the City, Big Trouble in Little China, South Park, Year of the Dragon, Lethal Weapon 4, Mickey Blue Eyes, Booty Call, Rush Hour 2, and Men in Black 3. The Chinese restaurants in movies are usually sets designed to typify a stereotypical American Chinese eatery, featuring "paper lanterns and intricate woodwork," with "numerous fish tanks and detailed [red] wallpaper [with gold designs]" and "golden dragons," plus "hanging ducks in the window".

== Cultural effects ==
=== Effect in United States ===
American Chinese cuisine provides an option for Americans to taste Chinese food that is adapted to both Chinese and American flavors. It allows people in America to learn more about Chinese traditional culture. During this process, Chinese Americans have developed a new cuisine which is different from traditional Chinese food, contributing to the food diversity in America. By running their own restaurants or eateries, first-generation Chinese immigrants reduced discrimination against them and gained sufficient income to send the next generations to universities or colleges. For Chinese Americans, American Chinese cuisine has already become part of their childhood memories and life, which also would be a bridge between Chinese and American cultural communications and interactions. For example, Panda Express and P.F. Chang's, two of the most famous American Chinese restaurants in the United States, have become the symbol of American Chinese cuisine and have gained appreciation from many Americans.

Additionally, American Chinese cuisine brought some new ingredients and cooking methods to the United States, such as stir-frying and steaming. Thus, many restaurants in the United States started to combine non-Chinese dishes with traditional Chinese cooking techniques and flavors, which promoted the development of fusion cuisine. Introduction of Chinese food also triggered people's curiosity about Asian food, including Japanese, Thai and Singaporean food, leading to a prevalence of Asian cuisine.

Authenticity

American Chinese food is often criticized for the lack of authenticity or called ‘fake’ Chinese food. The criticism stems from its different characteristics such as taste, ingredients, and preparation of the food. Scholars like Haiming Liu observe that “[t]raditions that seem timeless and ancient are in fact being constantly modified and reinvented within any given historical context,” so what may be authentic in a given time may not be in another. However, some argue that it represents a new yet authentic Chinese cuisine. While distinct from traditional regional Chinese cuisine, it is a fusion of American and Chinese flavors as it is a product of Chinese immigrants who have “adapted to their social environments, developed new identities, and formed new cultural sensibilities.” What started as a way for Chinese immigrants to eat familiar foods later transformed into a cultural blend of their traditional recipes and their adapted way of life facing the U.S. economy.

Authenticity in restaurants

Articles have stated that authenticity involves “more than food; music, ambience, and serving style come into play”. Restaurants’ authenticity is often not fixed, but rather based on communication, symbols, and changing ideas. Some argue that ethnic restaurants help immigrants feel connected culturally. This suggests that social connections and reputations contribute towards how authenticity is perceived in the culinary context. However, past studies argue that the concept of authenticity is simply a marketing ploy to attract non-Chinese customers rather than a true reflection of the culture. In other words, the concept of authenticity has often been examined from the perspective of the tourist seeking an authentic experience.

Nutritional concerns

The adaptation of Chinese cuisine to American tastes has also shifted its nutritional content. Many have claimed that these modifications have made it less healthy, as the dishes now contain higher levels of sodium, fat, and oil. This has influenced some to perceive the ‘Americanization’ of the cuisine to have contributed to the reduced nutritional value. For example, the orange chicken at Panda Express contains 22 grams of fat, exceeding the recommended daily intake of 20 grams. Similarly, the Kung Pao chicken contains 21 grams of fat, which also surpasses the dietary guidelines. However, it is possible to customize the meals to fit an individual's nutritional needs.

MSG panic

In the 1980s, a popular food seasoning known as monosodium glutamate (MSG) became the subject of health concerns leading up to the “MSG panic.” A report from Dr. Robert Ho Man Kwok, in a medical journal describing the symptoms he experienced after dining at a Chinese restaurant contributed to the growing concerns about MSG. Media coverage amplified these concerns which popularized the term “Chinese restaurant syndrome,” despite MSG being a widely used seasoning in a range of foods. In response to a heightened public concern, researchers hastily conducted studies that framed the issue towards Chinese cuisine rather than the seasoning MSG, though it has been claimed as the initial linkage.

Sociologist Stanley Cohen defined the fear surrounding MSG as a "moral panic”, in which “a condition, episode, person, or group of persons emerges to become defined as a threat to societal values and interests. Some research claims it was influenced by historical xenophobia toward Chinese Americans and immigrants, contributing to the stigmatization of Chinese cuisine as being of lower quality or unhealthy due to its MSG content.

=== Effect in China ===
Although some Chinese people will regard American Chinese food as inauthentic, some restaurants serving American Chinese food have opened in Chinese cities such as Beijing and Shanghai since 2018. For example, P.F. Chang's, a restaurant chain specializing in American Chinese food, opened a new restaurant in Shanghai, China. The CEO of this chain, Michael Osanloo, revealed his positive attitude towards the future of opening more chain restaurants in China because he believed that Chinese people would like to try something new.

Many owners of the American Chinese restaurants opened in the cities of China are Chinese Americans. Their primary target customers were people from foreign countries and students who have studied abroad. However, many native Chinese people, especially younger generations have a greater willingness to try American Chinese food. Yinhao Xu, the owner of Americanized Chinese eatery-Bamboo Chinese Fast Food in Beijing, said that he was surprised that some younger generations without overseas experiences have a higher level of acceptance of American-style Chinese cuisine. The reason for that is cultural effect; many American Chinese dishes appear in American shows or films, such as Friends and The Big Bang Theory, which leads young people in China to want to try American Chinese food.

=== Effect in other countries ===
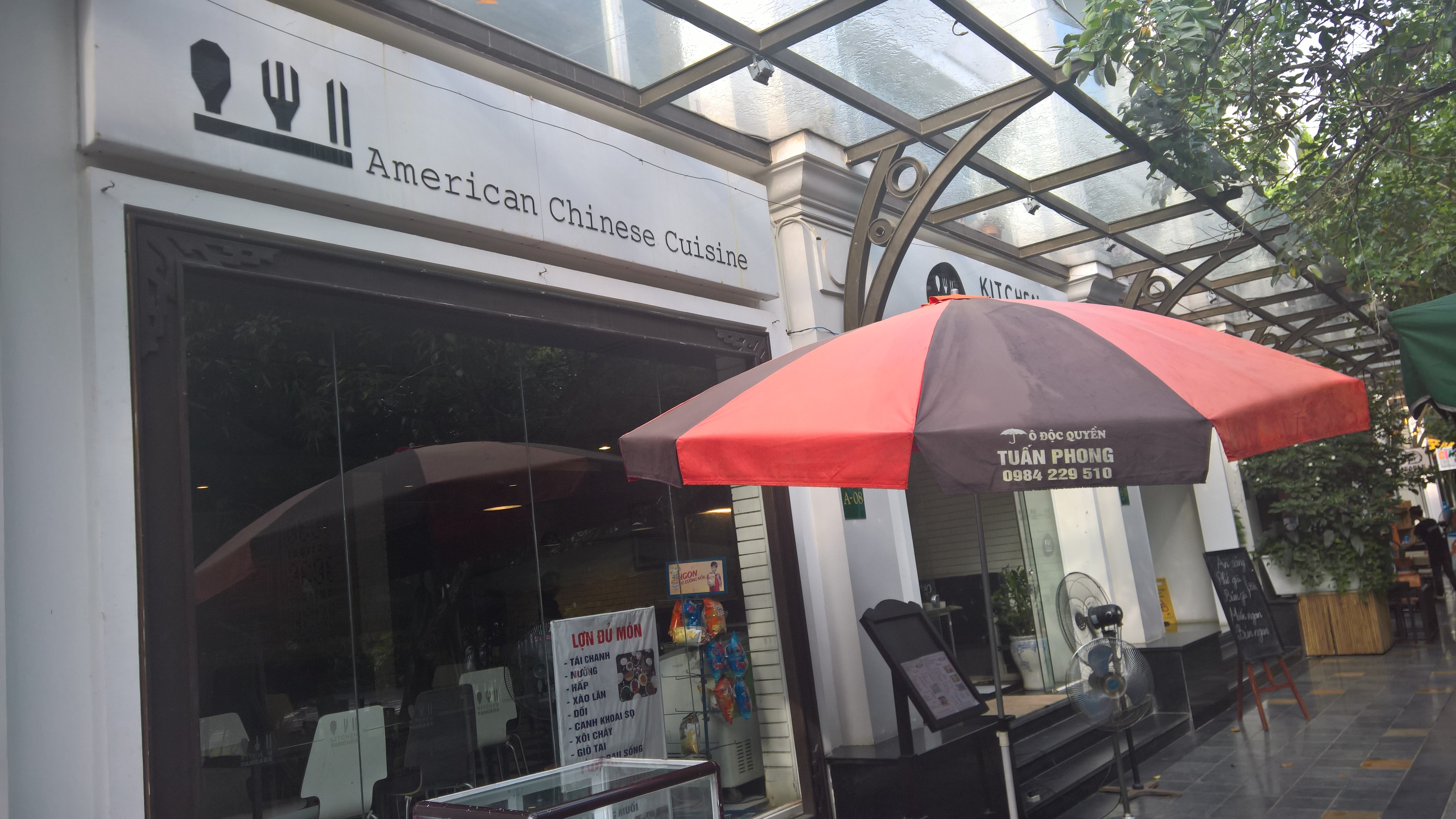
A Chinese American restaurant in the Hưng Yên province, Vietnam

==== South Korea ====
Woktionary, an American Chinese restaurant opened in Seoul, South Korea, provides authentic American Chinese food, such as chow mein and Mongolian beef. Meanwhile, the head chef Kim also added new flavors to some of the dishes.

At the same time, Panda Express also opened a restaurant in Seoul, South Korea. The CEO of the company indicated that many Korean customers were already expecting for this move.

==== Japan ====
The first Panda Express in Japan was opened in November 2016 in Kawasaki. It is dedicated to providing the original taste of American Chinese food in Japan. It offers similar menus in Japan compared to Panda Express restaurants in the United States, such as orange chicken, Beijing beef, and fortune cookies. Nevertheless, the restaurant also tries to implement localization by offering a limited dish only in Japan: Sweet and Pungent Shrimp.

==== United Kingdom ====
Chinese food and American Chinese cuisine has become a staple food in British cuisine as early as the 19th century with the first arrivals of Chinese immigrants to the UK. In a 2009 survey, over 80% of participants enjoy Chinese cuisine. British Chinese cuisine can be distinguished by its partnering with the British classic chips. American Chinese characteristics come inspired by the fried dishes like Rangoons and Chop Suey.

== See also ==
- American cuisine
- Australian Chinese cuisine
- British Chinese cuisine
- Canadian Chinese cuisine
- Chinese bakery products
- Chinese cuisine
- Chinese Latin American cuisine
- Filipino Chinese cuisine
- Fortune cookie
- Fusion cuisine
- Indian Chinese cuisine
- Jewish-American patronage of Chinese restaurants
- List of Chinese restaurants
- New Zealand Chinese cuisine
- Oyster pail
