= Puerto Rican Chinese cuisine =

Style of Chinese food found in Puerto Rico

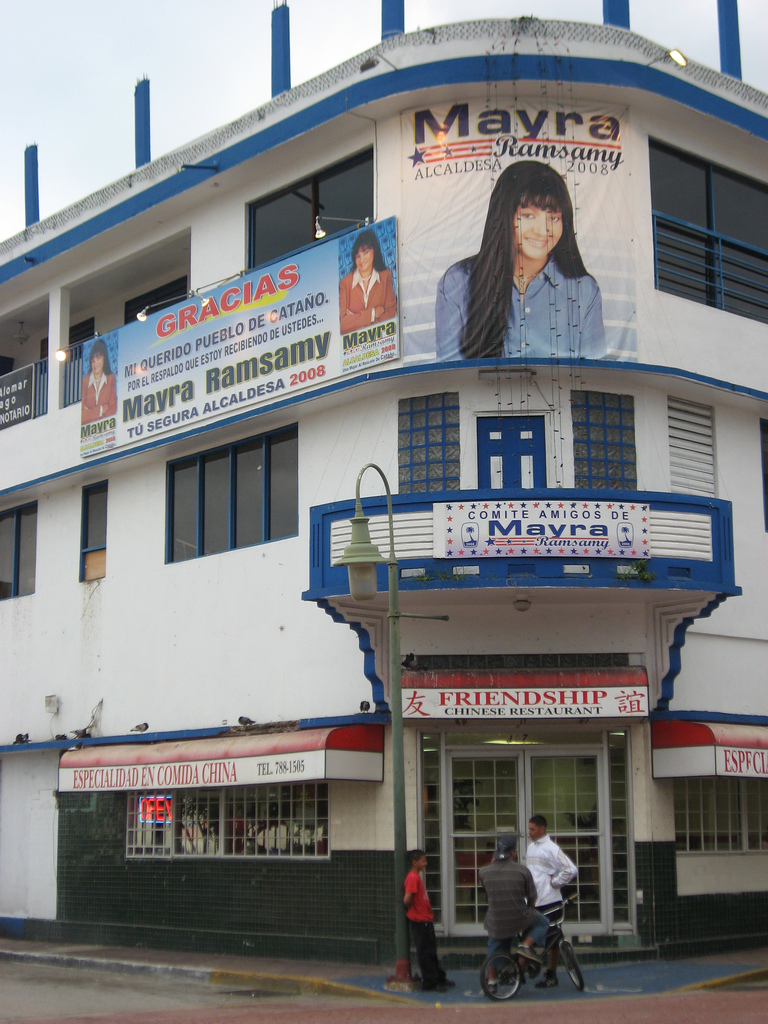
Chinese restaurant in Cataño

Puerto Rican Chinese cuisine (Spanish: Cocina china puertorriqueña) is a popular style of food exclusive to restaurants in Puerto Rico developed by its Chinese immigrants. The food is a variation of Cantonese cuisine with some elements of Puerto Rican cuisine. A typical dish consists of fried rice, a choice of meat, and French fries or tostones. The fried rice itself varies in every restaurant but can contain many ingredients such as ham, beef, shrimp, egg, lettuce, and onions. In 2020, there were an estimated 450 Chinese restaurants in Puerto Rico.

== Dishes ==
Popular dishes in many Puerto Rican Chinese restaurants are:

- Pollo al ajillo — Chicken and onion slices in garlic and oil.
- Camarones al ajillo — Shrimp in garlic and oil.
- Carne ahumada — Pieces of pork drenched in sweet red sauce. It is known in American Chinese cuisine as "boneless pork ribs".
- Pepper steak — Slices of beef and green pepper in soy sauce-based brown sauce.
- Pepper chicken — Same as pepper steak but with chicken.
- Chicken and broccoli — Chicken and broccoli in soy sauce-based brown sauce.
- Sweet and sour chicken
- Fried chicken — Deep-fried breaded chicken that is very popular and inexpensive.
- Chow mein
- Chop suey
- Fried rice
- Egg rolls
- Tostones

== Gallery ==
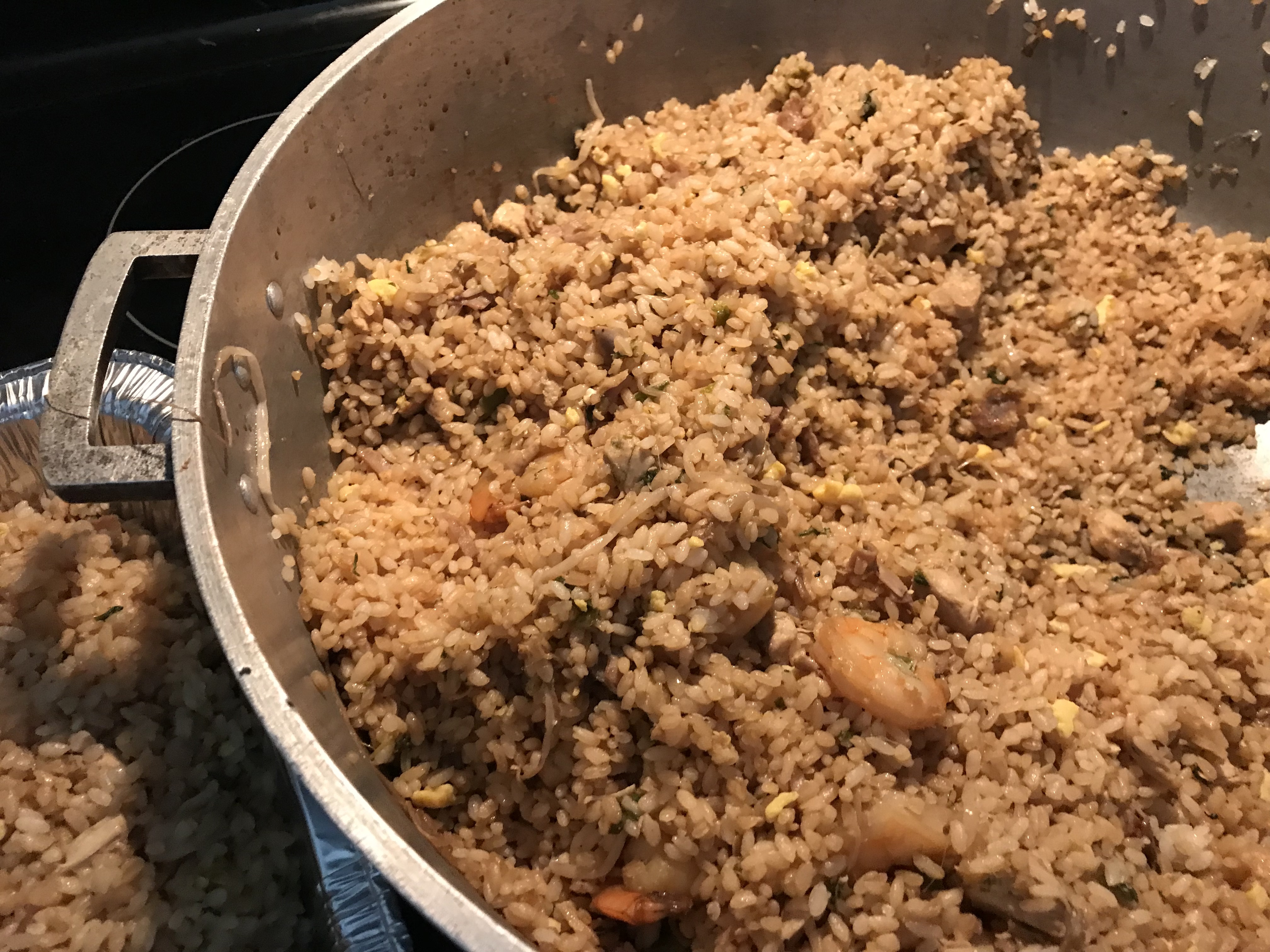
Puerto Rican fried rice

== See also ==
- American Chinese cuisine
- Chinese Latin American cuisine
- Caribbean Chinese cuisine
