= Oyster pail =

Food container

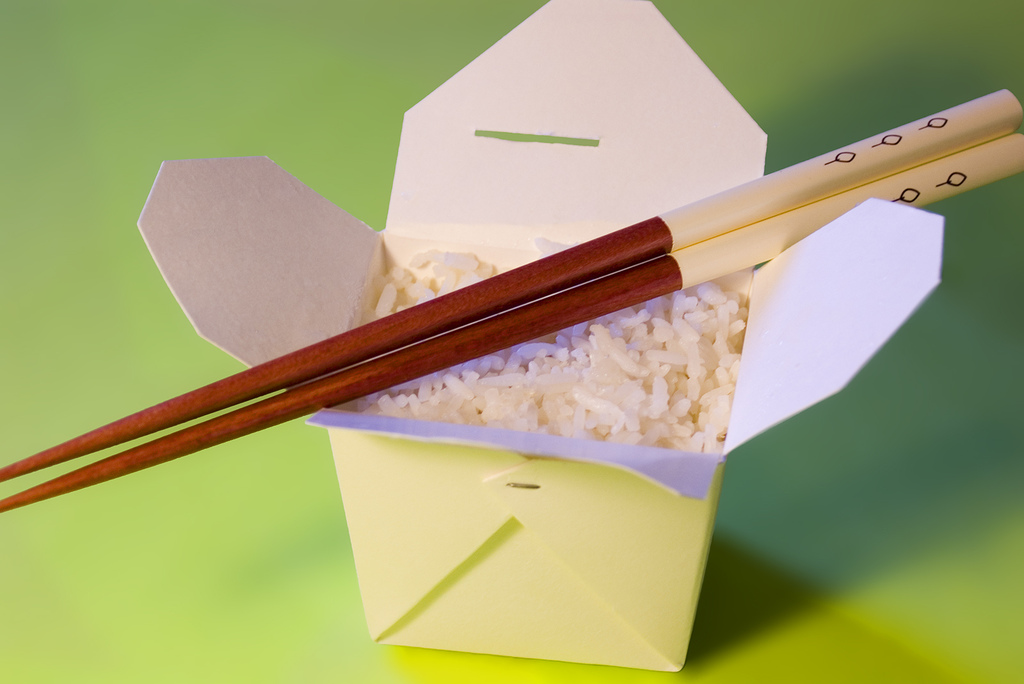
An opened, plain oyster pail of white rice, with chopsticks

An oyster pail (also known as a paper pail, Chinese food box or Chinese takeout container) is a folded, waxed or plastic coated, paperboard container originally designed to hold oysters. It commonly comes with a handle made of solid wire. It is often used by American Chinese cuisine restaurants in the United States to package take-out food. It can also be found in other countries, such as Poland, but is rarely seen in China and other Asian countries with high numbers of ethnic Chinese.

== Uses ==
Oyster pails with Chinese-inspired imagery

The container is inexpensive, durable and fairly leak-proof when kept upright. The top usually has a locking paperboard tab that is self-closing. The simple origami-like folded construction allows for some escape of steam from hot food. It is common to eat directly out of the container with chopsticks. The containers are primarily used with American Chinese cuisine, though they have begun to spread in some European and Latin American countries.

Oyster pails that can be used safely in microwave ovens (without the metal handle, which can cause arcing) are available. They often have no handle, or a plastic handle.

The containers may also be used for storing or transporting non-food items, such as soap bath beads or small parts. Takeout containers have also been offered as novelty packaging for small gifts.

== History ==
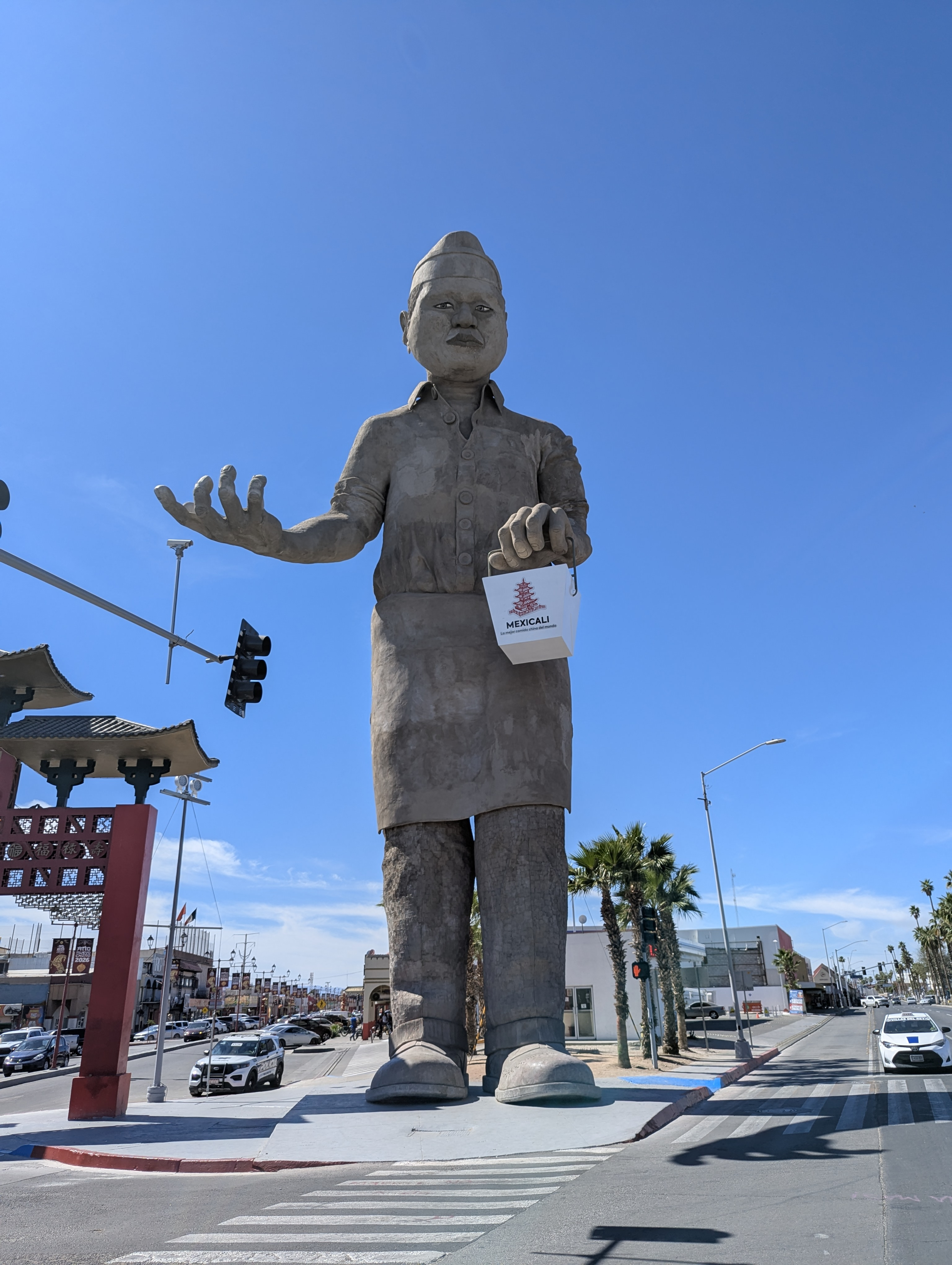
Sculpture titled "The Chinese Cook" in Mexicali, Mexico. In one hand, the cook is holding a giant food box.

Early patents date to 1890, 1894, and 1908. The paperboard oyster pail was invented at a time when fresh oysters were more popular and plentiful and less expensive than they are today. Since shucking oysters (removing the raw meat from the shell) takes some skill and can be difficult and dangerous, it was common to have the oyster seller open the oysters so they could be taken home for use in recipes. The oyster pail provided an inexpensive and sanitary way to do this. In the early 20th century oyster pails were used to hold honey. In the mid-20th century, overfishing (and the subsequent rise in price) of oysters left manufacturers with a significant number of unsold oyster pails.

In the United States after World War II, there was a huge increase in sales of takeout foods that could be purchased from restaurants. Chinese food was a popular choice, perceived by consumers as tasty, unusual, fairly inexpensive, and travelling well. The oyster pail was quickly adopted for Chinese takeout. The paperboard pails were to some extent self-insulating, and could be used for a wide variety of foods including cooked rice, moist dishes such as egg foo young and sauced dishes, though they were unsuitable for hot highly liquid dishes such as soups.

The containers are also used by restaurants offering classic American takeout food, such as French fries or fried clams, but the containers have become strongly associated with Chinese takeout. In 2011, the Smithsonian National Museum of American History displayed Chinese takeout containers in its exhibit Sweet & Sour: A Look at the History of Chinese Food in the United States.

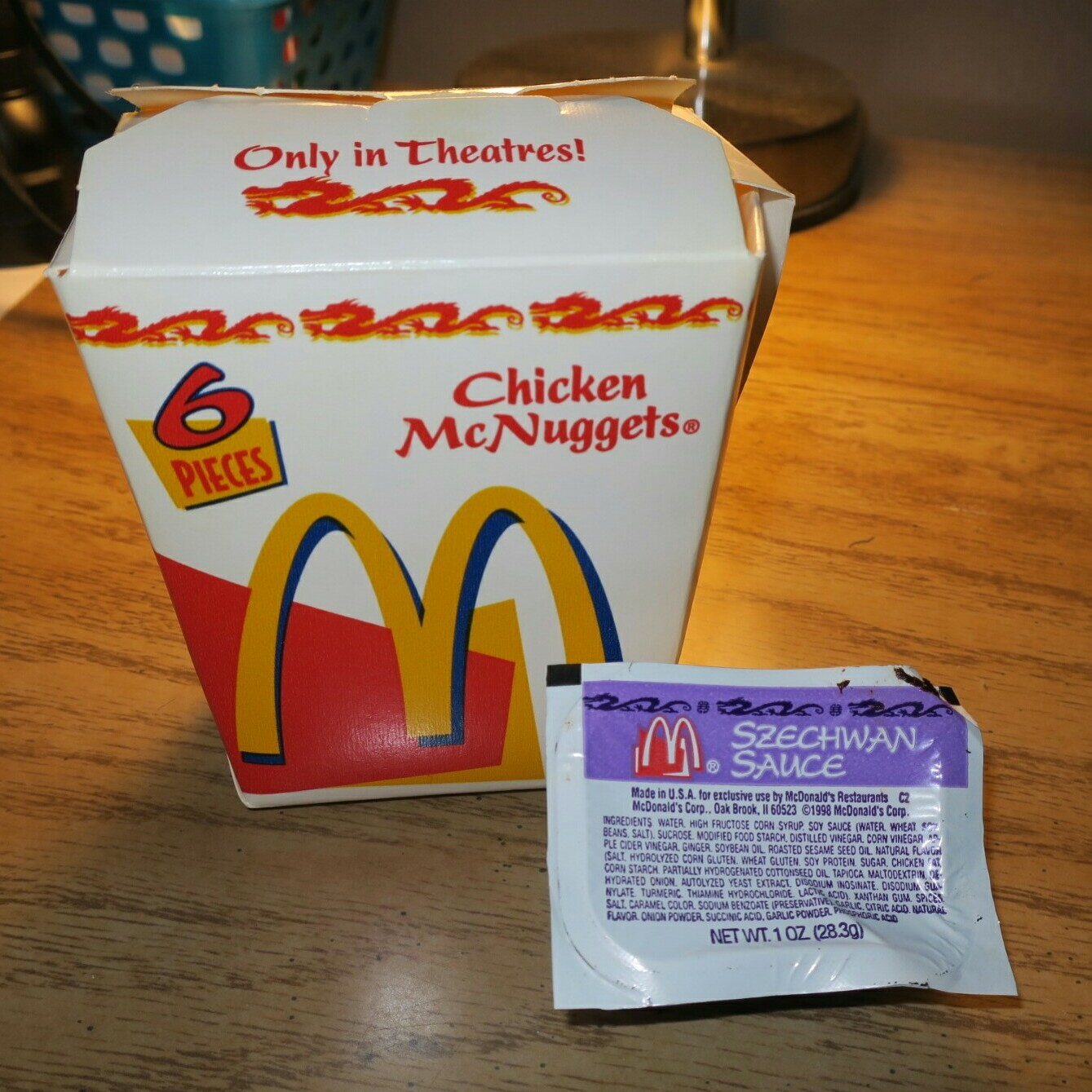
An oyster pail, used as part of a McDonald's promotion

== See also ==
- Foam food container
