= Cashew chicken =

Chinese-American dish

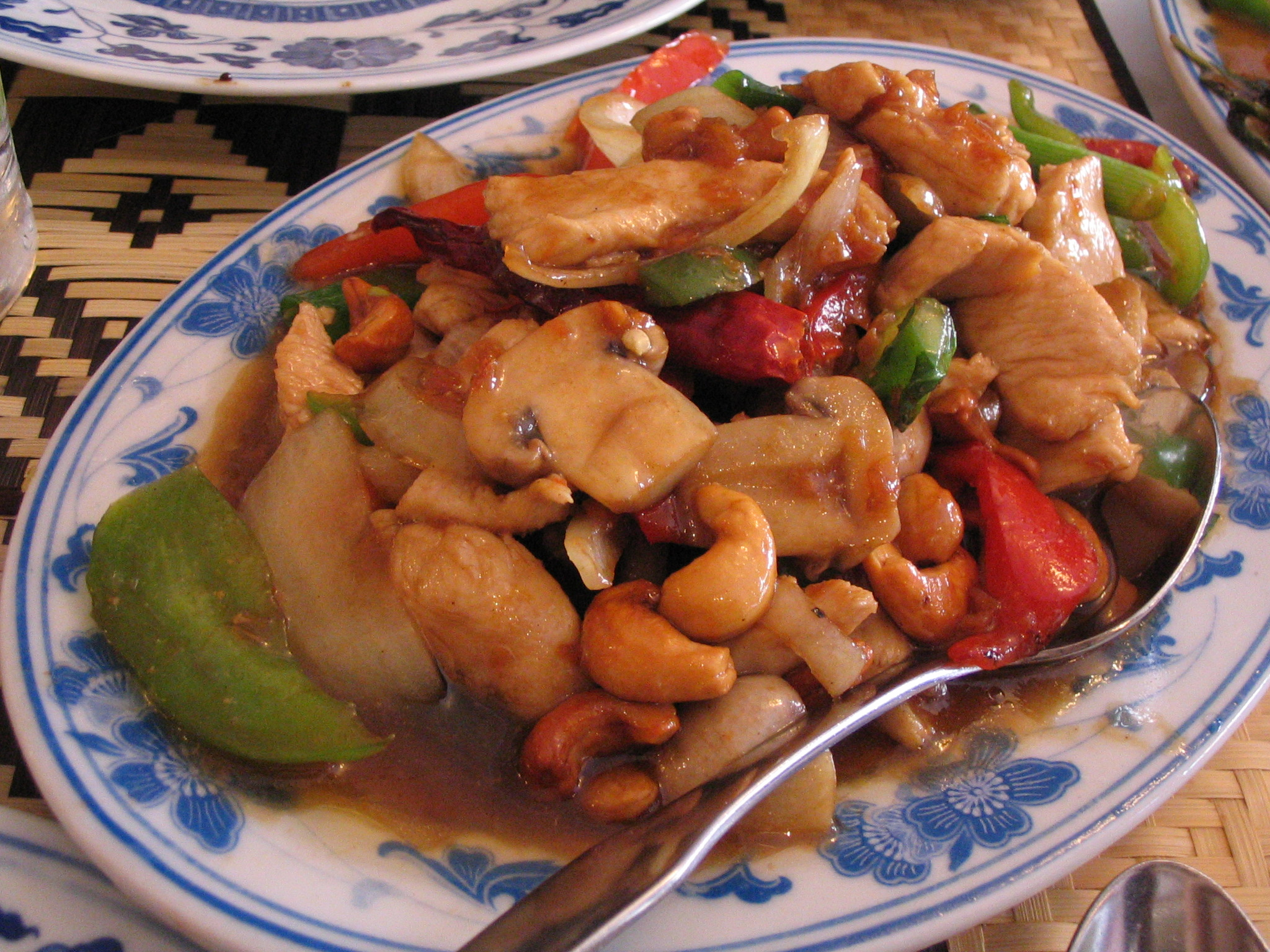
- A plate of stir-fried cashew chicken (traditional)
- Course: Main course
- Place of origin: United States
- Serving temperature: Hot
- Main ingredients: Chicken, cashews, chicken stock, soy sauce, oyster sauce, vegetables
- Variations: stir-fried, deep-fried

Cashew chicken (Chinese: 腰果雞丁) is a Chinese-American dish that combines chicken (usually stir-fried but occasionally deep-fried, depending on the variation) with cashew nuts and either a light brown garlic sauce or a thick sauce made from chicken stock, soy sauce and oyster sauce.

== Traditional cashew chicken ==
The traditional version of cashew chicken is stir-fried in a wok. Tender chunks of chicken are combined with crispy roasted cashews, vegetables and are tossed in a light sauce made from garlic, soy sauce and hoisin sauce, thinned with water.

== Springfield-style cashew chicken ==
The deep-fried version of the dish is closely associated with the city of Springfield, Missouri. Deep-fried cashew chicken was apparently first served in 1963 at the Grove Supper Club in Springfield. David Leong (1920–2020), a chef who moved to the United States from China in 1940, struggled to gain acceptance for the foods of his homeland so he began searching for a dish that would appeal to local residents' tastes. His famous deep-fried cashew chicken recipe was so popular he soon opened Leong's Tea House in Springfield. The dish became exceedingly popular in the Springfield area and is often cited as the unofficial "dish of the city". Springfield even hosts an annual festival that is centered on this chicken dish: Springfield Sertoma's Cashew Craze.

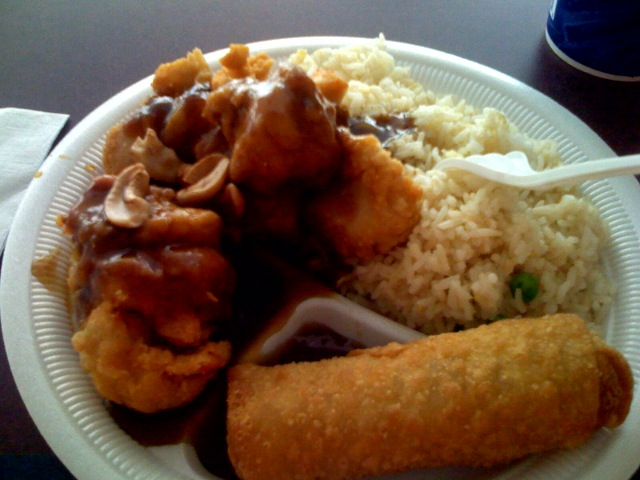
A plate of Springfield-style (deep fried) cashew chicken served with fried rice and an egg roll.

Borrowing from the local love of fried chicken, Leong came up with a variation of the preexisting dish. Instead of stir-frying the chicken, as is normally done, he deep-fried the chicken chunks. He then covered them with the typical sauce made from chicken stock, soy sauce and oyster sauce, and added the handful of cashews. He also included chopped green onions as a twist and it became an immediate hit with the local crowd. As word spread about the dish, so did the recipe. Leong's Tea House closed in 1997, but Springfield-style cashew chicken is still being served at over 70 Chinese restaurants, as well as many non-Chinese restaurants, in and around the Springfield metropolitan area, and elsewhere in Missouri and other states. Springfield-style cashew chicken has been mentioned on The Food Channel, a nationwide syndicated radio program, and the floor of the U.S. House of Representatives.

In 2010, Leong's son, with his father's assistance, opened a new restaurant in Springfield serving the same style of cashew chicken. Leong died at age 99 on July 21, 2020.

== Similar dishes ==
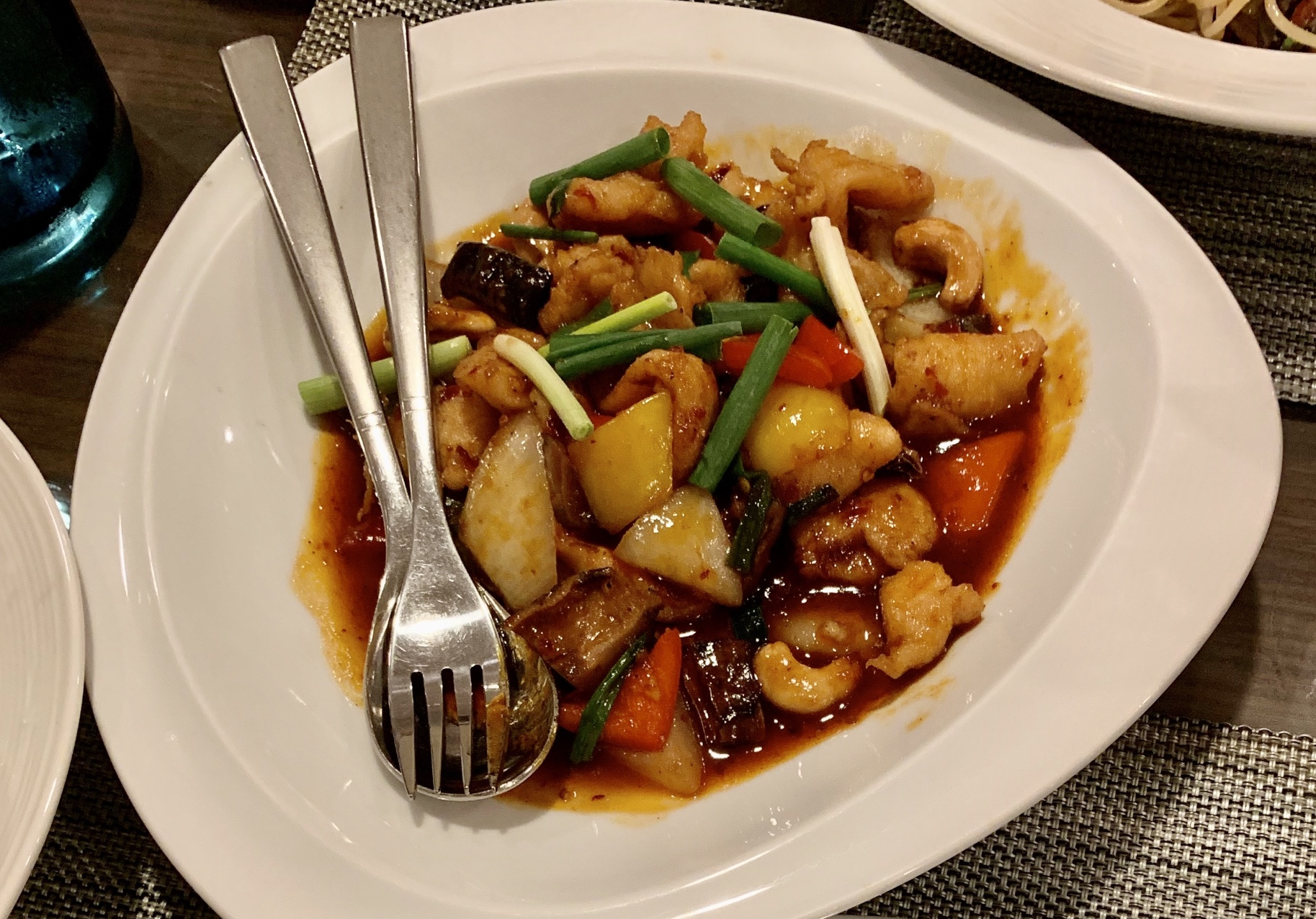
A plate of kai phat met mamuang (Thai-style stir-fried cashew chicken) in Thailand

In Thai cuisine, there is a related stir-fry dish called kai phat met mamuang himmaphan or kai phat met mamuang.

Almond chicken, commonly served in American Chinese restaurants, is similar to cashew chicken.

In Haitian cuisine, there is an unrelated chicken stew with cashews called poul ak nwa that includes Scotch bonnet peppers.

== See also ==
- Chop suey
- General Tso's chicken
- Kung Pao chicken
- List of deep fried foods
- Mapo doufu
