= Almond chicken =

American Chinese dish

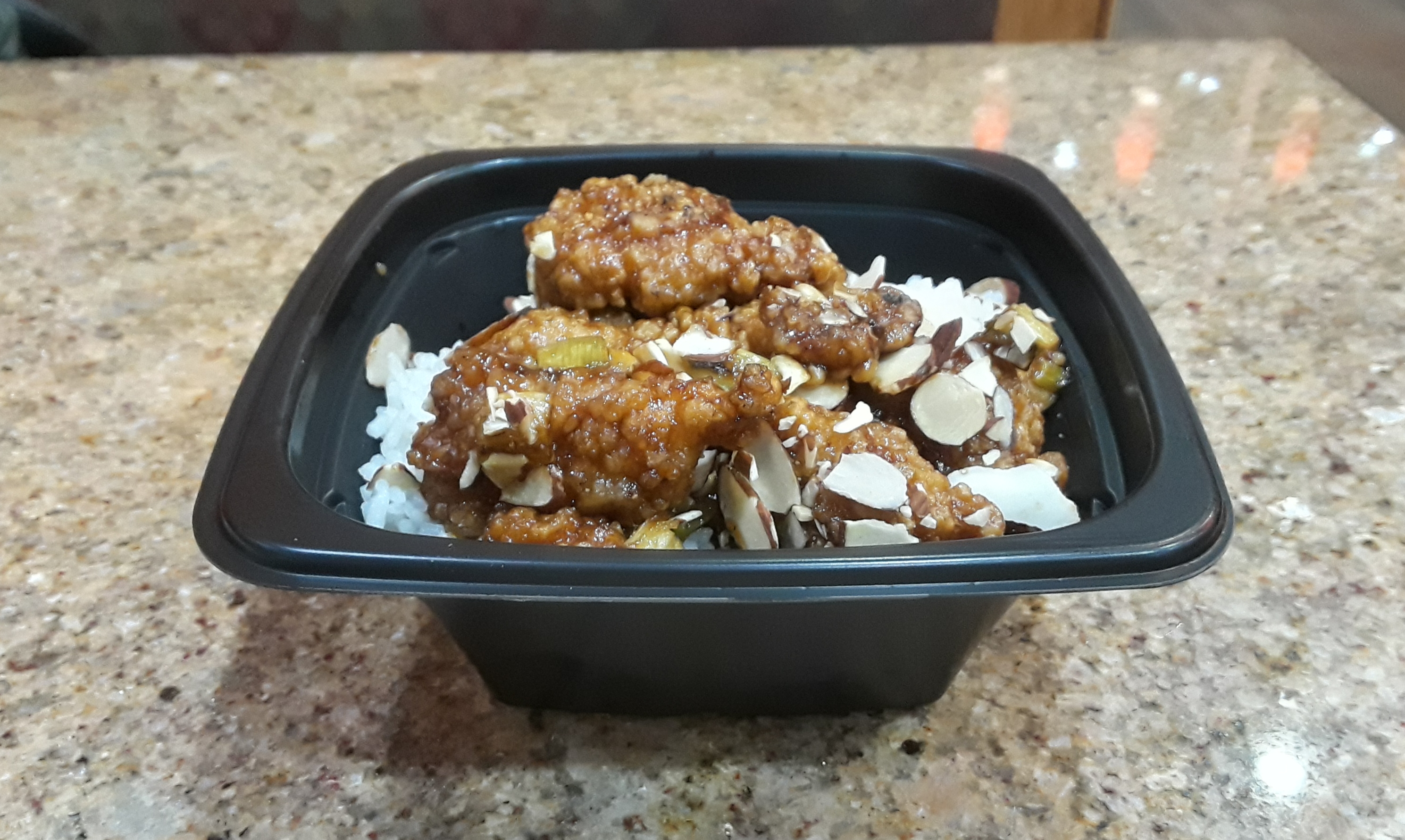
- Fried almond chicken from Panda Express
- Course: Main course
- Region or state: Detroit, Michigan or Columbus, Ohio
- Associated cuisine: American Chinese food
- Main ingredients: Chicken, almonds

Almond chicken is an American Chinese dish. The most common variations involve either stir-frying or deep-frying chicken and topping it with almonds.

== Preparation ==
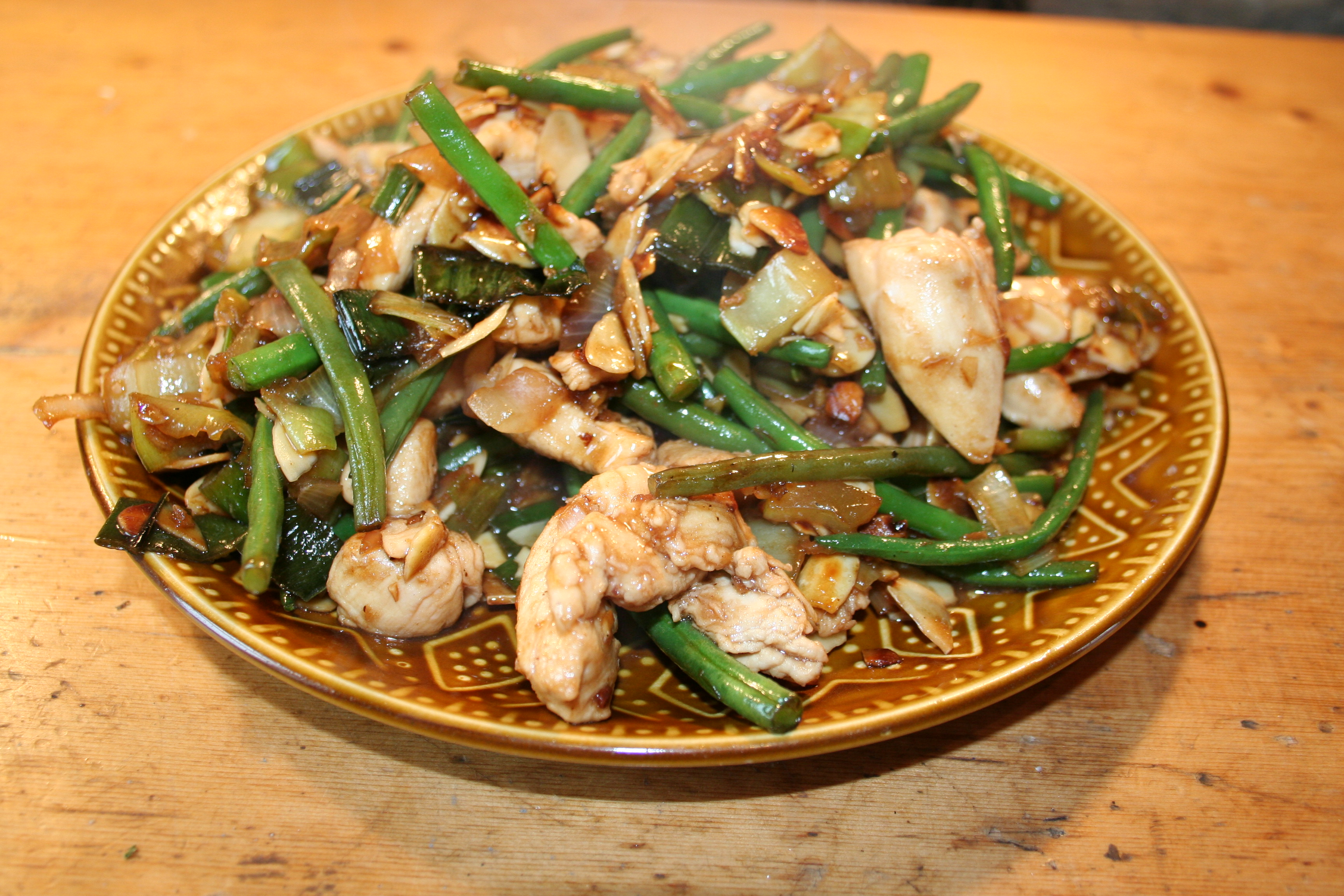
Almond chicken stir fry

Some variations of almond chicken are prepared in a similar manner to cashew chicken, by stir-frying chicken with almonds and vegetables. This variation is found in the 1917 Chinese Cook Book by Shiu Wong Chan, which calls for stir-frying chicken with onions, mushrooms, water chestnuts and celery before coating with "Chinese gravy" and topping with almonds. This is one of the oldest recipes for the dish.

Other versions of the dish are prepared by battering chicken and coating it with almonds before frying.

=== Almond boneless chicken ===
Almond boneless chicken or war sui gai, a variation popular in Michigan, features sliced chicken which is deep-fried twice. It is then topped with mushroom gravy and sliced almonds and served on a bed of iceberg lettuce. The dish is strongly associated with Detroit, but is also commonly served in Ohio and parts of Eastern Canada.

The origins of almond boneless chicken are unknown, although it was likely developed by Chinese immigrants from Guangdong. It may have originated in Detroit, Michigan, or Columbus, Ohio, and was historically associated with chop suey houses.
