= Caribbean Chinese cuisine =

Fusion of Chinese and West Indian cuisines

Caribbean Chinese cuisine is a style of food resulting from a fusion of Chinese and West Indian cuisines. The Chinese influence is predominantly Cantonese, the main source of Chinese immigrants to the West Indies. West Indian food is itself a mixture of West African, British, Indian-South Asian, Spanish, French, Dutch, Middle Eastern, and Indigenous cooking styles.

Although a long-favoured cuisine in West Indian restaurants and Chinese Caribbean households, it is only recently that an increase in number of Caribbean–Chinese restaurants has occurred in Canada and the United States. These are more often than not "Guyanese restaurants" owing to that country's particular historical connection to Chinese immigration, although signs may also claim "Caribbean Chinese food," "West Indian and Chinese cuisine", or variations thereof.

== History ==
In 1834, the black British slaves working in the Caribbean colonies were freed. That eventually created a labour vacuum that was filled by indentured labourers from Madeira, India and China. A sizeable portion of these immigrants were destined for Trinidad and Tobago, Cuba, Jamaica, and Guyana.

The first groups of Chinese immigrants were forcibly kidnapped or deceived into making the journey, although this practice was curbed somewhat by an agreement between British and Chinese authorities to formally supervise recruitment processes. From then on, families were encouraged to emigrate, although often without being completely informed of the working and living conditions or their contractual obligations. Chinese women began arriving in 1860, but in small numbers. The period from 1860 to 1866 saw a relatively large influx of immigrants, bringing the local Chinese population in British Guyana to a peak of 10,022 in 1866. There were only two ships to supplement this population following 1866, and afterwards Chinese immigrants came of their own free will and at their own expense.

== Staples ==
The menus of Caribbean Chinese restaurants are greatly affected by whether or not the restaurant identifies with a specific Caribbean nation or not. Dishes from nation-specific restaurants are often variations on local specialities, in addition to more widely known food items:

- Jerk chicken fried with chow mein noodles
- Chicken wings deep-fried with chili, sweet and sour, or black bean sauce.
- Chicken-in-the-rough — Fried rice with Chinese-style fried chicken on the side.
- Curried duck roti — Potatoes and duck in a curry sauce, rolled in a flaky flatbread.
- Bangamary ding — Fried bangamary tossed with cashews and mixed vegetables.
- Char siu pork dhalpouri — Chinese pork, peas, onions and geerah (cumin) rolled in a roti.

== Culture ==
Caribbean Chinese restaurants enjoy considerable popularity in Toronto, as well as New York and Florida. They have large Chinese and Caribbean populations.

== See also ==
- Cantonese cuisine
- Puerto Rican Chinese cuisine
- Canadian Chinese cuisine
- Chinatown, Toronto
- Chinese Canadian
- Chifa
