= David R. Chan =

American lawyer (born 1948)

- Born: August 3, 1948 (age 77)

David R. Chan (born August 3, 1948) is a retired American tax lawyer who is notable for visiting more than eight thousand Chinese restaurants and documenting each visit and meal. He started visiting restaurants in his college years. As Chan traveled for his work, he would sometimes visit four restaurants each day.

He has never learned to use chopsticks. Chan says the best Chinese food is in Richmond, British Columbia. Despite being near the 2023 Monterey Park shootings, Chan continued dining out.
