= Chicken and broccoli =

American Chinese dish

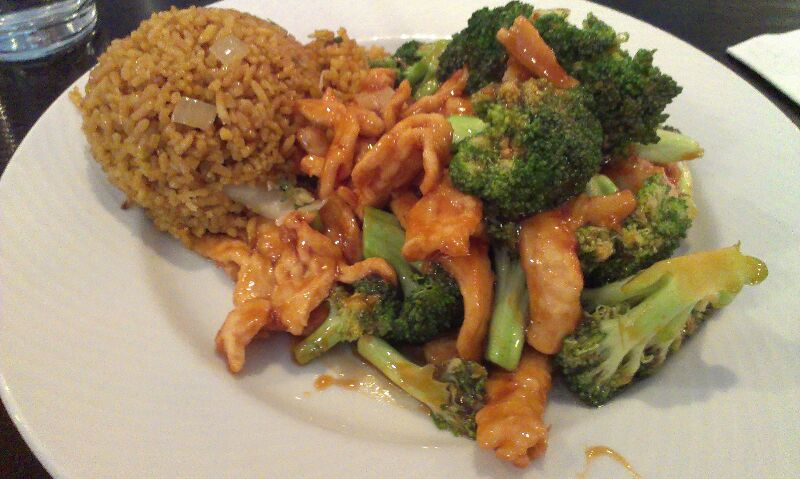
- Chicken and broccoli with fried rice
- Type: Stir fry
- Course: Main course
- Region or state: United States of America
- Associated cuisine: American Chinese cuisine
- Main ingredients: Chicken, broccoli

Chicken and broccoli, or broccoli chicken, is an American Chinese dish.

== History ==
Chicken and broccoli developed in Chinese restaurants of the United States where it became widely popular, and is not based on authentic Chinese cuisine.

== Preparation ==
The dish is prepared by stir frying blanched broccoli florets and seared pieces of chicken breast. The chicken is often velveted to tenderize it. The stir fry typically includes a "brown sauce" made with oyster sauce, soy sauce, ginger, garlic and Shaoxing wine. Some recipes substitute Shaoxing wine with sherry.

== See also ==
- Beef and broccoli
