= Beef and broccoli =

American Chinese dish

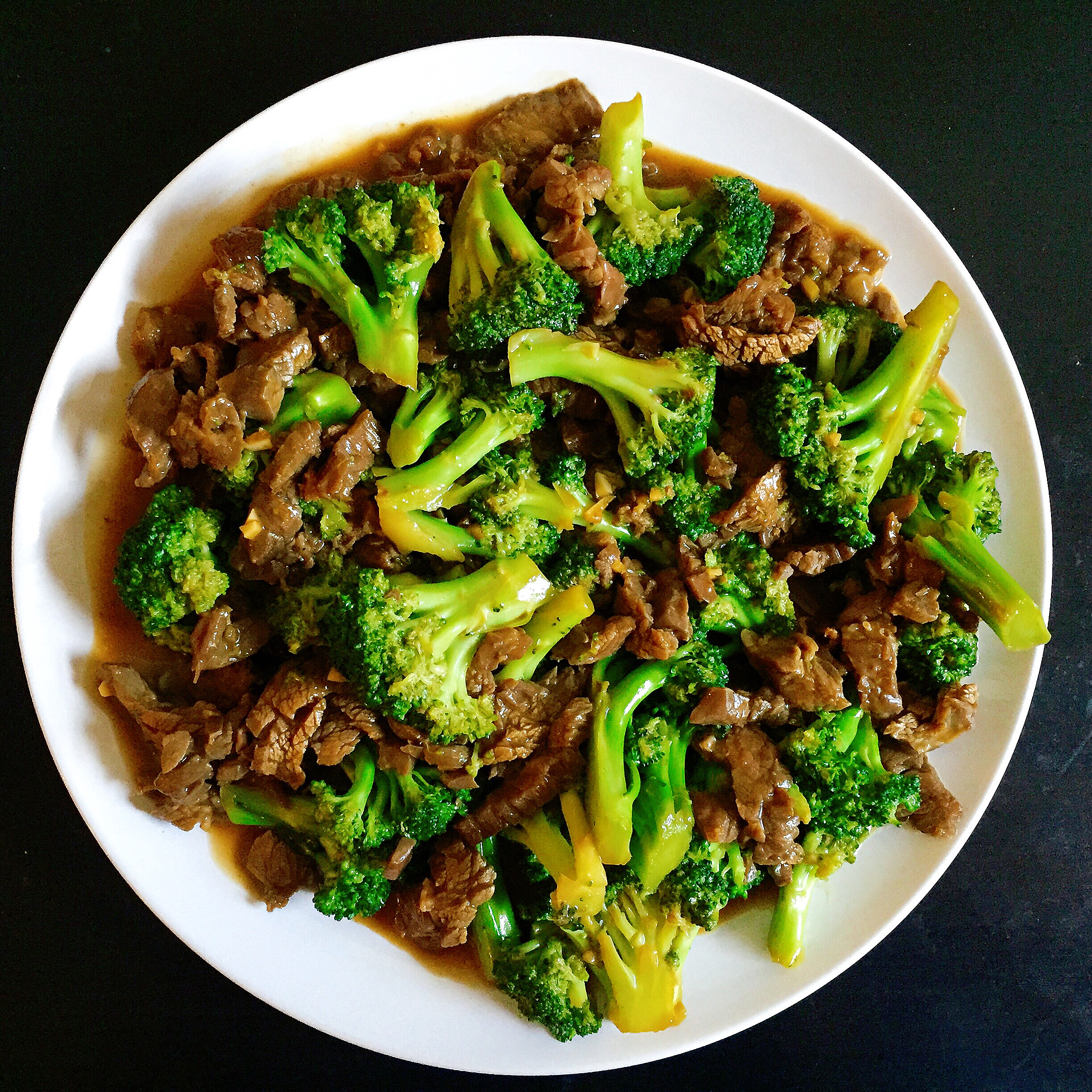
- Type: Stir-fry
- Course: Main course
- Region or state: United States of America
- Associated cuisine: American Chinese cuisine
- Main ingredients: Beef, broccoli

Beef and broccoli, sometimes called broccoli beef, is an American Chinese dish.

== Origins ==
The diaspora of Chinese immigrants in 19th-century America likely developed beef and broccoli. It became an established feature of American Chinese restaurants during the 1920s. By the 1950s, it had become ubiquitous and it is now one of the most popular American Chinese dishes in the 21st century. It is based on a Chinese dish that used gai lan, which was replaced with broccoli, a vegetable initially popularized in the United States by Italian immigrants.

== Preparation ==
The dish is prepared by stir-frying sliced steak and broccoli florets with oyster and/or soy sauce, and aromatics such as garlic and ginger. Sugar or honey may be used to sweeten the sauce. Corn starch is commonly used to tenderize the beef and thicken the sauce.
