= Chow mein =

Chinese stir-fried noodles

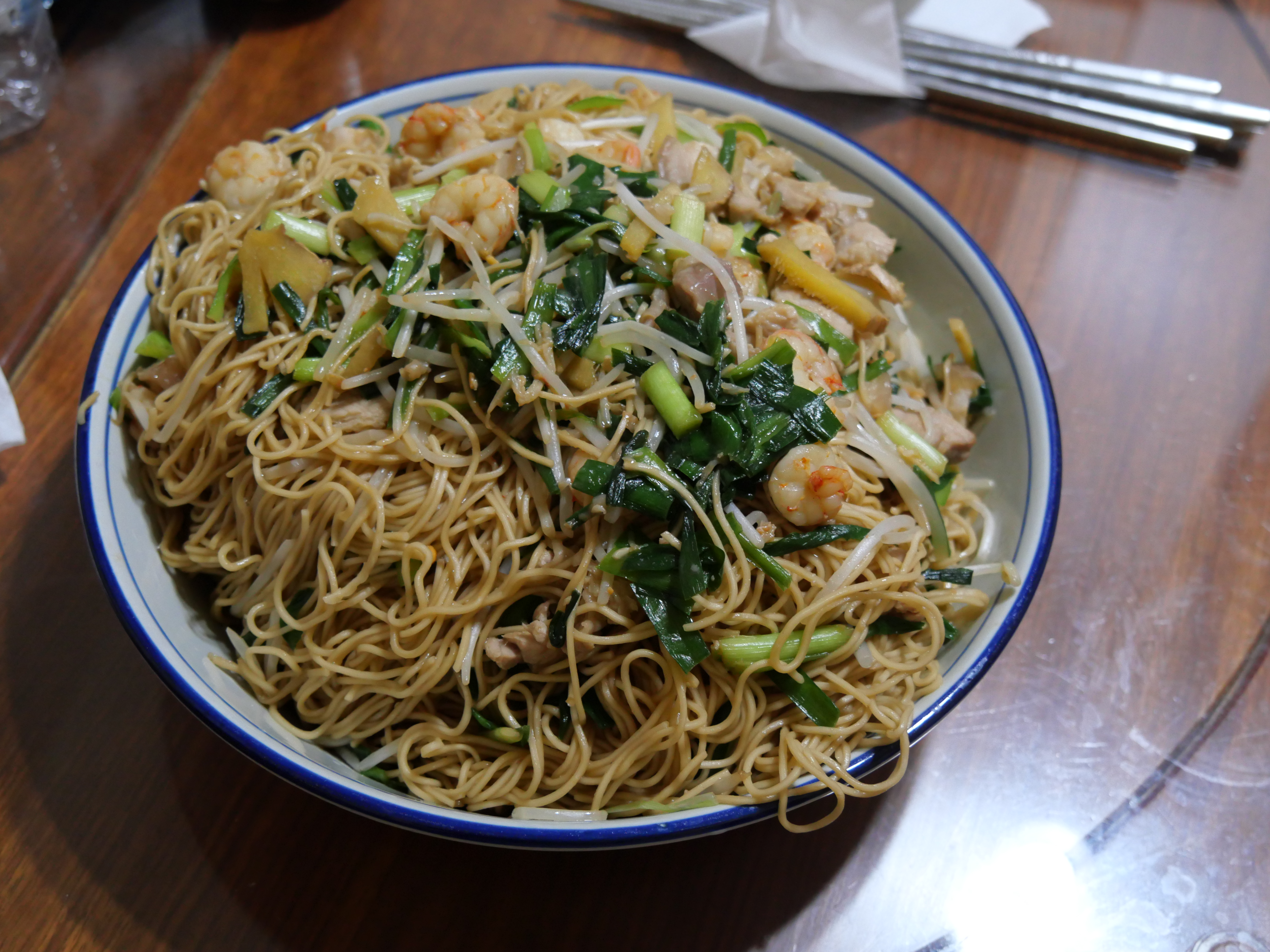
- A plate of chow mein
- Course: Main course
- Place of origin: China
- Region or state: Guangdong
- Serving temperature: Hot
- Main ingredients: Noodles, soy sauce, vegetables
- Variations: Chicken, pork, beef, shrimp, tofu

Chinese name
- Traditional Chinese: 炒麵
- Simplified Chinese: 炒面
- Hakka: cauˋ mien
- Literal meaning: "Stir-fried noodles"
Transcriptions
Standard Mandarin
- Hanyu Pinyin: chǎo miàn
- IPA: [ʈʂʰàʊ.mjɛ̂n]
Hakka
- Romanization: cauˋ mien
Yue: Cantonese
- Yale Romanization: cháau mihn
- Jyutping: caau^{2} min^{6}
- IPA: [tsʰaw˧˥.min˨]
Southern Min
- Hokkien POJ: chhá-mī

Chow mein (/ˈtʃaʊ ˈmeɪn/ and /ˈtʃaʊ ˈmiːn/; simplified Chinese: 炒面; traditional Chinese: 炒麵; Mandarin Pinyin: chǎomiàn; Cantonese Yale: cháaumihn) is a dish of Chinese stir-fried noodles with vegetables and sometimes meat or tofu. Over the centuries, variations of chǎomiàn were developed in many regions of China; there are several methods of frying the noodles and a range of toppings can be used. It was introduced in other countries by Chinese immigrants. The dish is popular throughout the Chinese diaspora and appears on the menus of most Chinese restaurants abroad. It is particularly popular in India, Nepal, the UK, and the US.

== Etymology ==
The earliest Chinese immigrants arriving in the United States were predominantly from Taishan. As such, the English spelling and pronunciation were influenced by the Taishanese pronunciation chāo-mèing. The written term first appeared in American English as chow mien in 1890 and as the current spelling chow mein in 1903. Note that other dialects of Chinese differ from the English pronunciation with Mandarin as chǎo-miàn and Cantonese as cháau-mihn.

The first term chow is written with the Chinese character 炒 and means stir-fried or sautéed. The second term mein is written with the characters 麵 (traditional) or 面 (simplified) and means noodles or flour. The complete term simply means stir-fried noodles.

== Regional cuisine ==
=== American Chinese cuisine ===
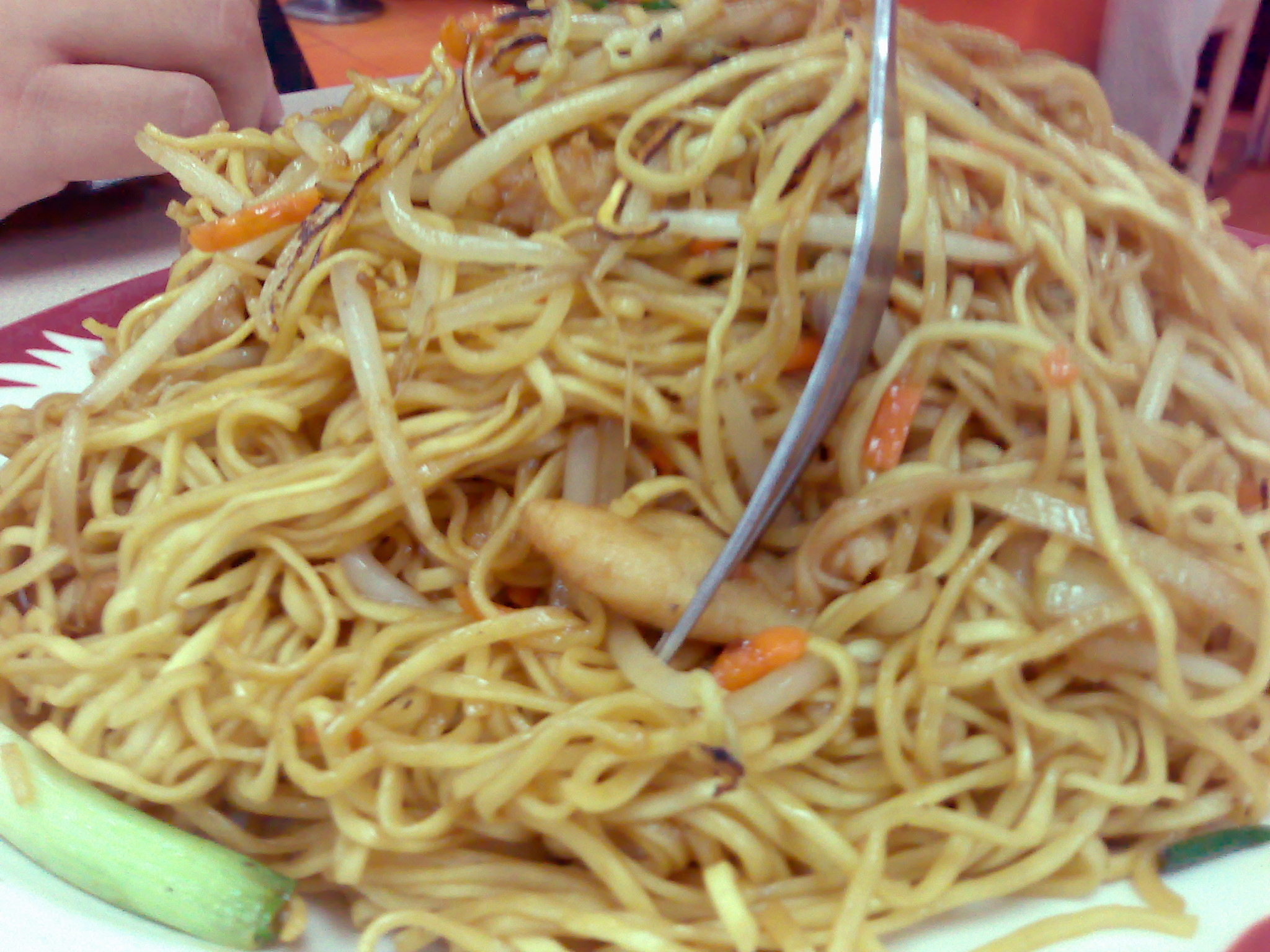
Chicken cube chow mein

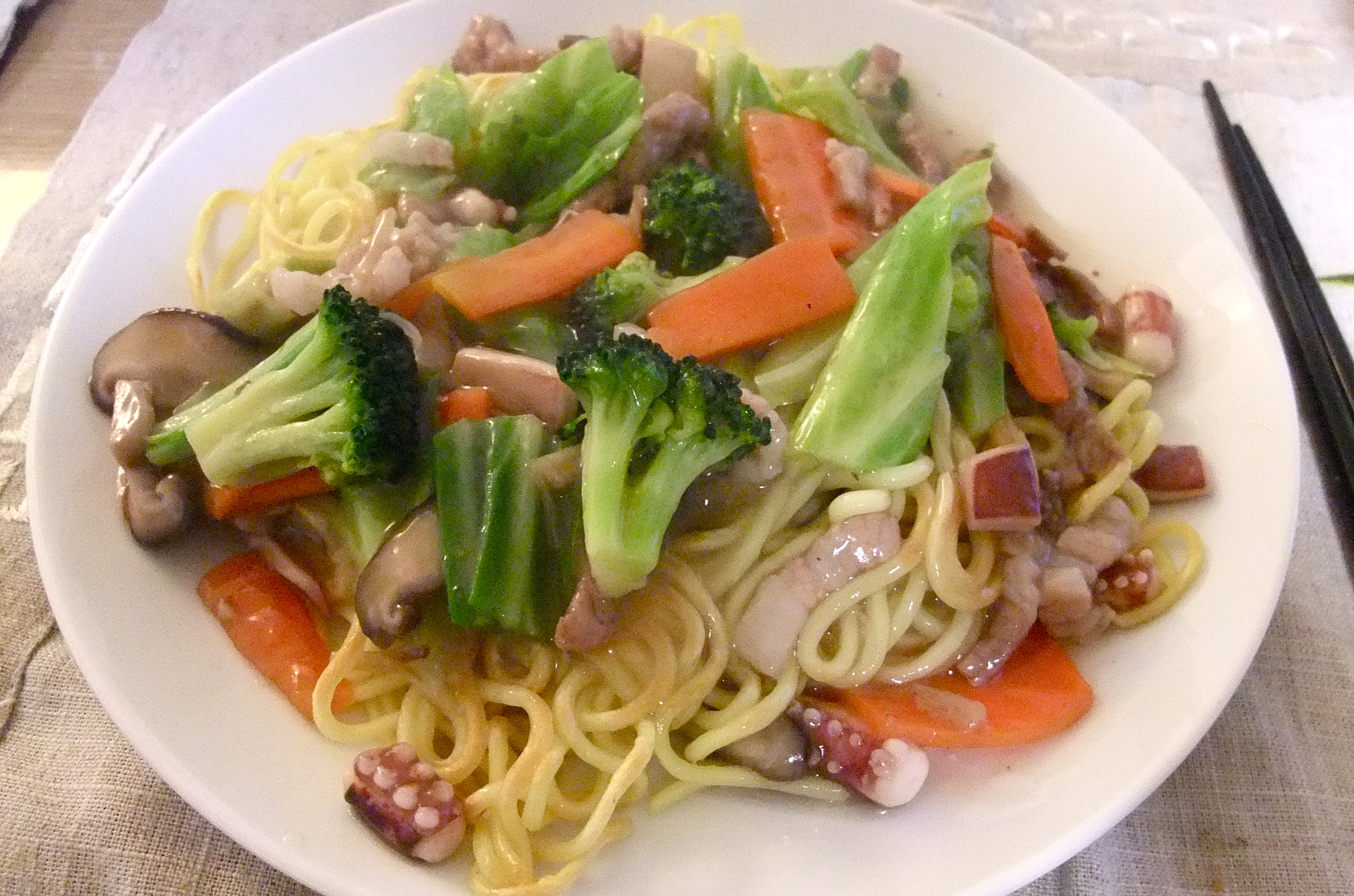
Subgum chow mein

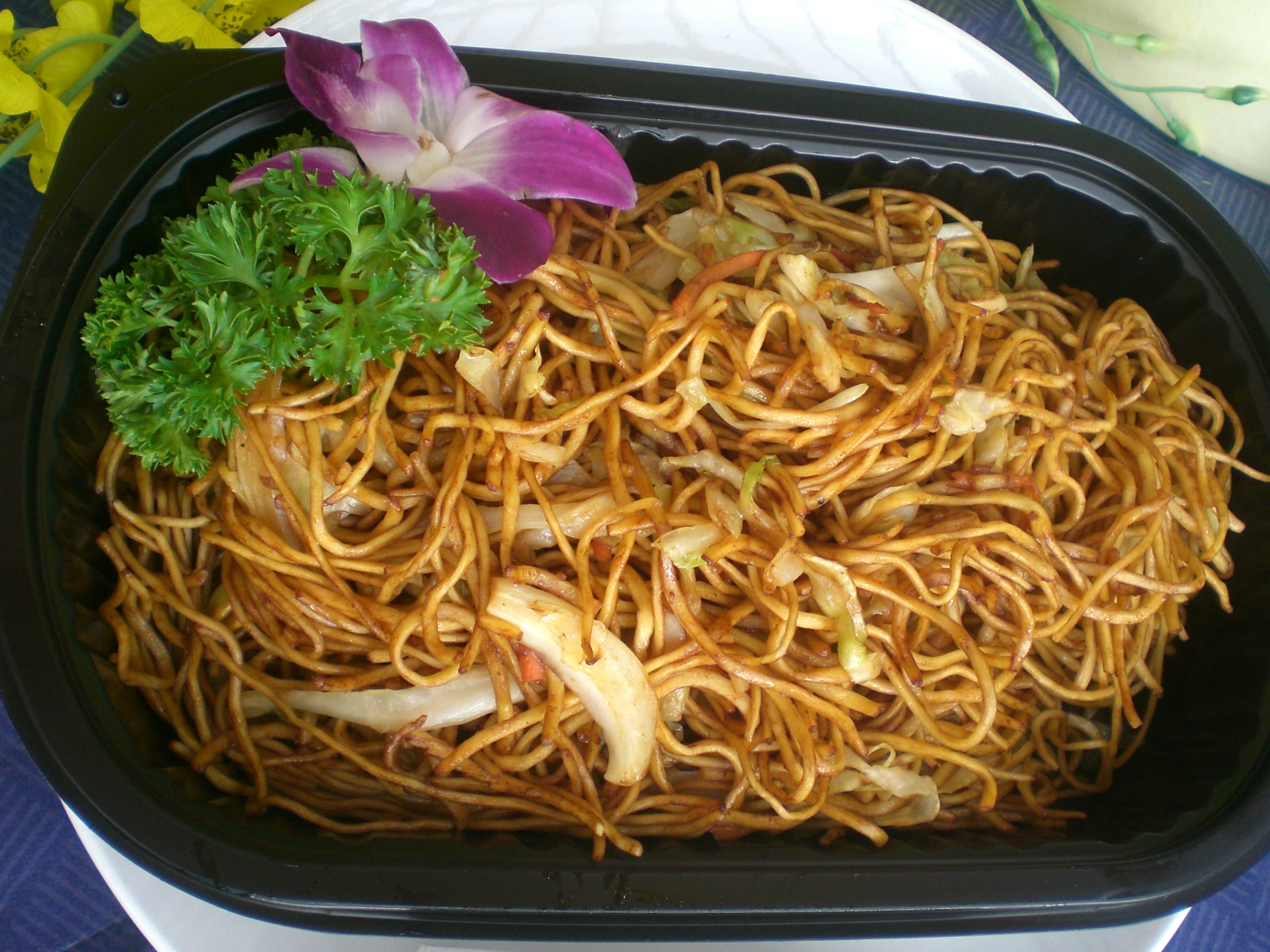
Soy sauce chow mein

Chow mein was introduced from China into the United States by Chinese immigrants who came from the Guangdong provinces in the California gold rush era, bringing their Cantonese style of cooking.

In American Chinese cuisine, it is a stir-fried dish consisting of noodles, meat (chicken being most common but pork, beef, shrimp or tofu sometimes being substituted), onions and celery. It is often served as a specific dish at westernized Chinese restaurants. Vegetarian or vegan chow mein is also common.

In the American market, two types of chow mein include crispy chow mein and steamed chow mein.

The steamed chow mein has a softer texture, while the former is crisper and drier. Crispy chow mein uses fried, flat noodles, while soft chow mein uses long, rounded noodles.

Crispy chow mein either has onions and celery in the finished dish or is served "strained", without any vegetables. Steamed chow mein can have many different kinds of vegetables in the finished dish, most commonly including onions and celery but sometimes carrots, cabbage and mung bean sprouts as well. Crispy chow mein is usually topped with a thick brown sauce, while steamed chow mein is mixed with soy sauce before being served.

There is a regional difference in the US between the East and West Coast use of the term "chow mein". On the East Coast, "chow mein" is almost always the crispy kind. At some restaurants located in those areas, the crispy chow mein noodles are sometimes deep fried and could be crispy "like the ones in cans" or "fried as crisp as hash browns". At a few East Coast locations, "chow mein" is also served over rice. There, the steamed style using soft noodles is a separate dish called "lo mein". Currently, on the West Coast, "chow mein" is almost always the steamed style, and the term "lo mein" is not widely used.

The crispy version of chow mein can also be served in a hamburger-style bun as a chow mein sandwich.

There are also variations on how either one of the two main types of chow mein can be prepared as a dish. When ordering "chow mein" in some restaurants in Chicago, a diner might receive "chop suey poured over crunchy fried noodles". In Philadelphia, Americanized chow mein tends to be similar to chop suey but has crispy fried noodles on the side and includes much celery and bean sprouts and is sometimes accompanied with fried rice. Jeremy Iggers of the Star Tribune describes "Minnesota-style chow mein" as "a green slurry of celery and ground pork topped with ribbons of gray processed chicken". Bay Area journalist William Wong made a similar comment about what is sold as chow mein in places like Minnesota. A published recipe for Minnesota-style chow mein includes generous portions of celery and bean sprouts. Another Minnesotan variant includes ground beef and cream of mushroom soup. In Louisiana, "Cajun chow mein" is a noodle-less rice dish that is a variation of jambalaya.

Food historians and cultural anthropologists have noted that chow mein and other dishes served in Chinese American restaurants located away from areas without any significant Asian American population tend to be very different from what is served in China and are heavily modified to fit the taste preference of the local dominant population. As an example, the chow mein gravy favored in the Fall River area more closely resembles that used in local New England cooking than that used in traditional Chinese cooking. The creator of canned chow mein, who founded the food manufacturer Chun King, admits to using Italian spices to make his product more acceptable to Americans whose ancestors came from Europe.

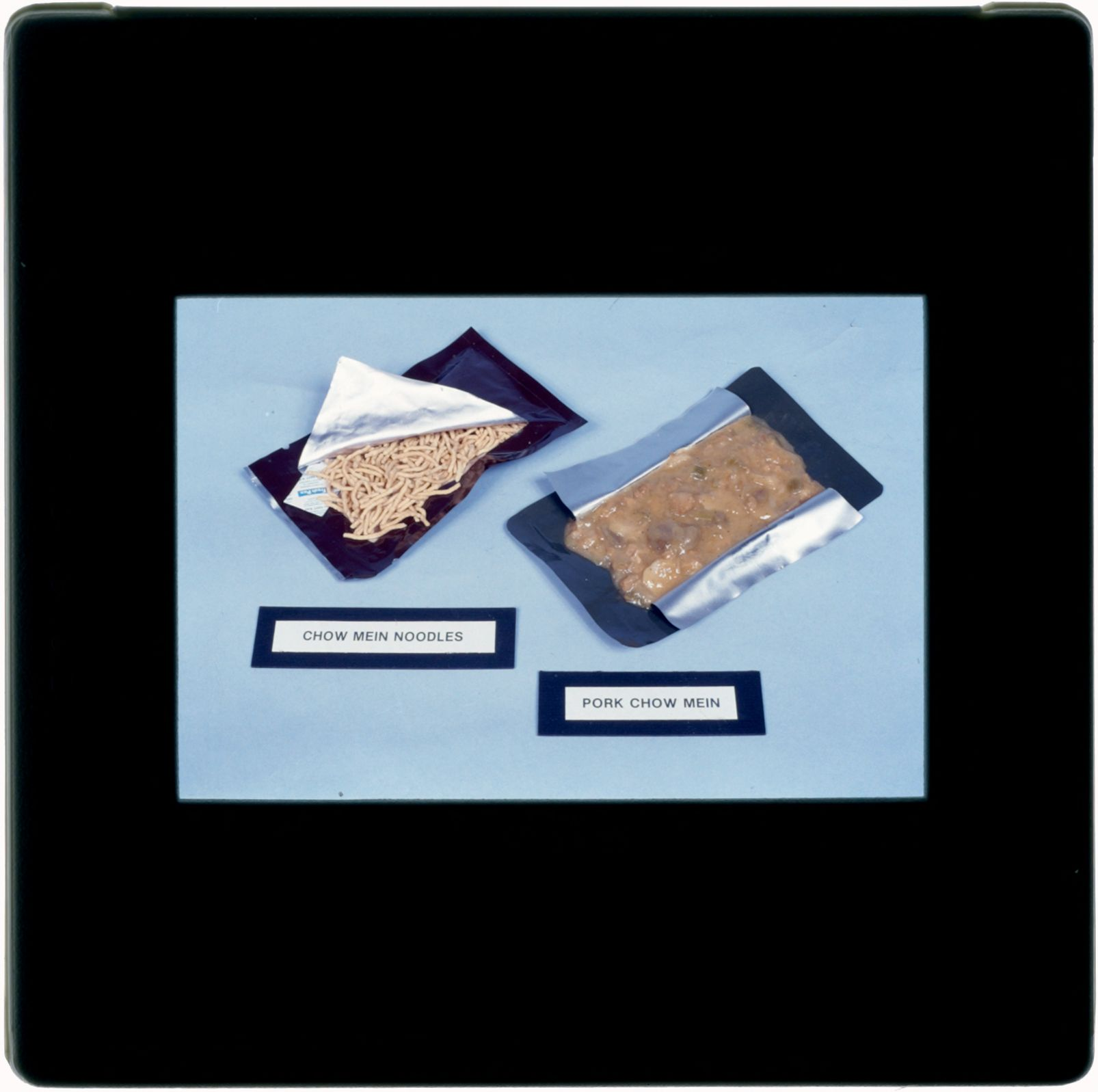
Late 20th-century U.S. Army field rations containing a chop suey-like stew labeled as "chow mein"

In 1946, one of the first companies to market "chow mein" in a can was Chun King. The product's creator was Jeno Paulucci, the son of Italian immigrants, who developed a recipe based mostly upon Italian spices that would be better catered to the food preferences of European immigrants and some Americans of similar ethnic origins. To keep cost down, Paulucci replaced expensive water chestnuts with lower-cost celery stalks that were originally destined for cattle feed. Paulucci's company became so successful selling canned chow mein and chop suey that President Gerald Ford quipped, "What could be more American than a business built on a good Italian recipe for chop suey?" when praising Paulucci's accomplishments with Chun King. After Paulucci sold Chun King in 1966, the company was sold several more times more until it was dissolved in 1995.

By 1960, Paulucci told The New York Times that "At Chun King we have turned out a 'stew-type' chow mein. I'd guess this type has been around for thirty—maybe forty—years. To make it, all the meat, seasonings and vegetables are dumped into a kettle and stewed for hours—until everything is cooked."

Outside of Chinese restaurants, what is labeled as chow mein is frequently a chop suey-like stew that has little resemblance to actual chow mein. For example, the official U.S. military recipe (employed by cooking facilities of all four American military services) does not include noodles, comes with instructions to serve the dish over steamed rice, and can serve 100 persons per batch.

=== Australian cuisine ===
Outside of Asian communities, many Australians appear to confuse chow mein with chop suey. The most common Australian version contains minced beef (called ground beef in North America) and curry powder and sometimes served over rice instead of fried noodles. This version has been promoted by the Australian Institute of Sport, on ABC radio, and a popular Australian women's magazine since the mid-1960s and during the 21st century.

A chicken chow mein recipe that was published in a major Melbourne newspaper in 1963 had a recipe list that included a can of condensed cream of mushroom soup, a can of pineapple pieces, and cooked noodles or macaroni that were combined and baked in an oven.

=== Canadian Chinese cuisine ===
Canadian westernized Chinese restaurants may offer up to three different types of chow mein, none of which is identical to either of the two types of American chow mein. Cantonese style chow mein contains deep-fried crunchy golden egg noodles, green peppers, pea pods, bok choy, bamboo shoots, water chestnuts, shrimp, Chinese roast pork (char siu), chicken, and beef, and is served in a thick sauce. Plain chow mein is similar to other Western chow meins, but contains far more mung bean sprouts; some regional recipes may substitute bean sprouts for noodles completely.

The Japanese Canadian community also have their own version of chow mein that might include dried seaweed and pickle ginger and could be served in a bun. The Japanese Canadian chow mein is sometimes referred to as "Cumberland Chow Mein" where it first appeared in the Canadian coal mining town of Cumberland, British Columbia, during the nineteenth century. Cumberland was the first site of significant Japanese immigration into Canada.

In Newfoundland, their version of chow mein does not contain any noodles. In place of noodles, cabbage cut in such a way to resemble noodles are used as a substitute. Although no one knows the reason why this change had occurred, it is believed that the island's remoteness in the North Atlantic during its history as an independent self-governing British dominion contributed to the lack of availability of the necessary ingredients from the rest of North America or from Europe.

=== Caribbean Chinese cuisine ===
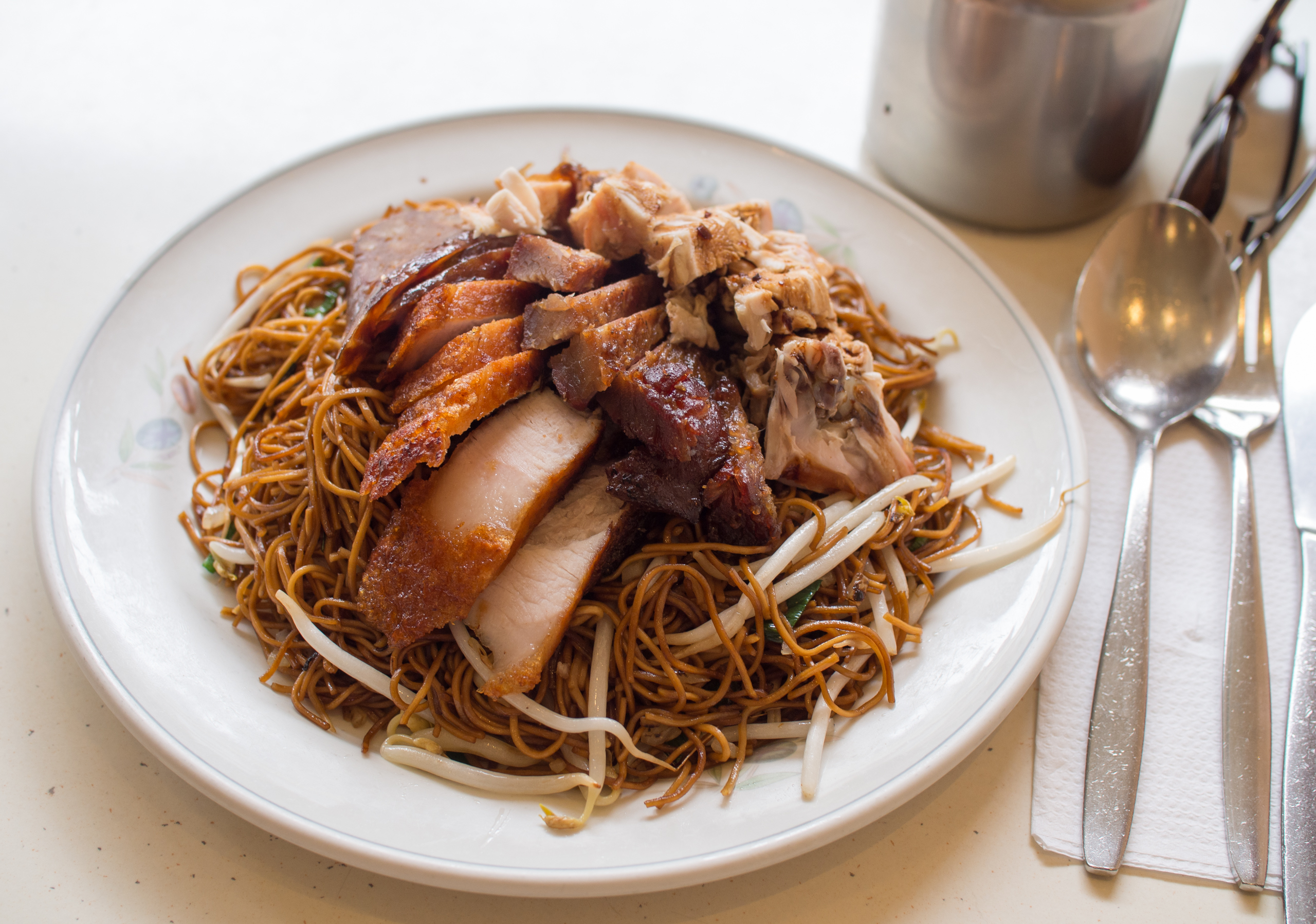
Surinamean Tjauw min with moksi meti

Many West Indian people include chow mein in their cuisine, especially peoples from islands like Trinidad and Tobago and Jamaica, which include a significant ethnic Chinese population; much of the cooking has infused itself into the population in general. As well, in the South American Caribbean countries Guyana and Suriname (known by its Dutch name "tjauw min" or "tjauwmin"). These chow mein dishes are cooked in a similar manner, with green beans, carrots, peas, onions and sometimes other vegetables. Meat used is mostly chicken but sometimes pork or shrimp. The Surinamese version may use a pork sausage as the meat. The main difference is that local spices are added, and the dish is often served with hot Scotch bonnet peppers or pepper sauce.

In Cuba, aside from the foreign-owned tourist hotels which often serve Western-style Chinese food, local Chinese restaurants can be found in Havana that offer a distinct Cuban style.

=== Central America ===
In Panama, chow mein is prepared with a mixture of onions, peppers, celery and carrots with pork or chicken and stir fried with noodles. Another recipe includes canned corn. In El Salvador, chow mein may contain carrots, cabbage or broccoli. Another Salvadoran recipe includes potato and chayote. In Guatemala, chow mein (or chao mein) is usually prepared with chayote and carrots and served on a corn tostada.

=== Indian Chinese cuisine ===
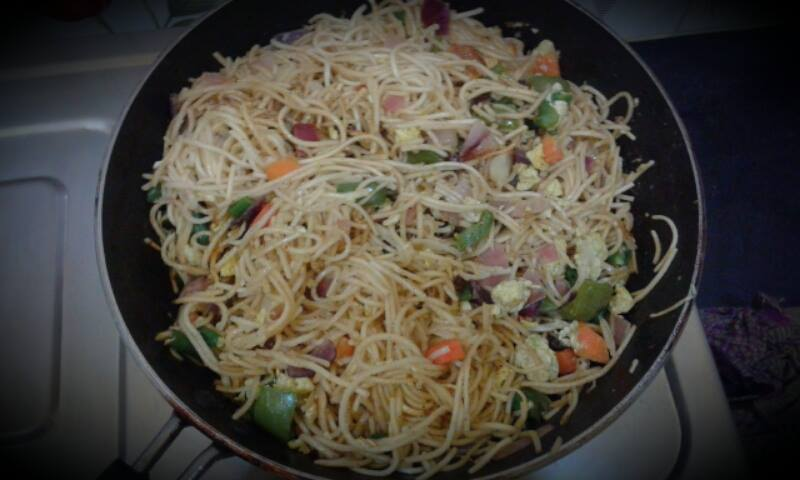
Kolkata style egg chow mein

Chow mein is a popular dish in the Indian Chinese cuisine. In India, it was introduced by the Chinese of Calcutta. Chow mein always refers to soft, boiled noodles. When the noodles are lightly fried, the chow mein is referred to as "Hakka style" which originates from the culinary traditions of the Hakka people in southeastern China. Crispy fried noodles are also often available, but under the name "chop suey" or "American chop suey". All styles always include a medley of vegetables including cabbage, bamboo shoots, pea pods, green peppers, chilli peppers and carrots. Common proteins are chicken and scrambled eggs, but pork and shrimp are also used. In the New Delhi area, chow mein can sometimes include paneer with the mixture of noodles and vegetables.

In Kolkata, the home city of Indian-Chinese cuisine, the dish is sold out of thousands of street carts lining every neighborhood, often spelled as "chowmin" and involves heavy use of green chilli and garlic. The Pakistani version includes carrots, cabbage, peppers, spring onions, chilies, and ginger garlic paste.

=== Indonesian Chinese cuisine ===
There are two Indonesian versions of chow mein. One is Mie goreng, which is (sometimes spicy) stir-fried noodle dish with variants of toppings, and the other is a crispy noodle dish topped with sauce that is pretty popular and existed in virtually all Chinese restaurant in Indonesia. It goes popular with the name of Ifumi or Mi Siram, literally means drenched noodle, in Indonesian Chinese cuisine. In Indonesia, ifumi is usually served with thick egg sauce with cauliflower, broccoli, mushroom, kekkian or prawn cake, and chicken. Several varieties does exists such as vegetarian and seafood that contains squid, prawn and fish instead of kekkian. The dish is often confused with Lo mein.

=== Mauritian cuisine ===
In Mauritius, Mauritian chow mein is known as "mine frire", "mine frite", "mine frit" and "minn frir". The term is a combination of Cantonese/Hakka word for noodles "mein" (Chinese: 面; pinyin: Miàn) and French word for "fried". It was likely introduced in Mauritius by Chinese immigrants who mostly came from the Southeast part of China (mostly from the Cantonese regions) at the end of the 19th century. It was mainly eaten by the Chinese community who settled in Mauritius and eventually evolved in a distinctively Mauritian dish diverging from the original recipe. It is a classical Sino-Mauritian dish which is eaten by all Mauritians regardless of ethnicity, reflecting the influence of Chinese and Sino-Mauritian community despite being one the smallest community on the island. It is a very common street food and can be found in almost all restaurants on the island.

=== Mexican Chinese cuisine ===
Chow mein has gained popularity in Mexico, which received waves of Chinese immigrants in the past, particularly in northwestern Mexico where the latter have had much historical presence. Mexicali, a city in Baja California, is known for its distinct style of chow mein, which typically use Mexican ingredients as substitutes for traditional Chinese ones, an adaption that was made by Chinese immigrants settling the area.

=== Nepalese cuisine ===
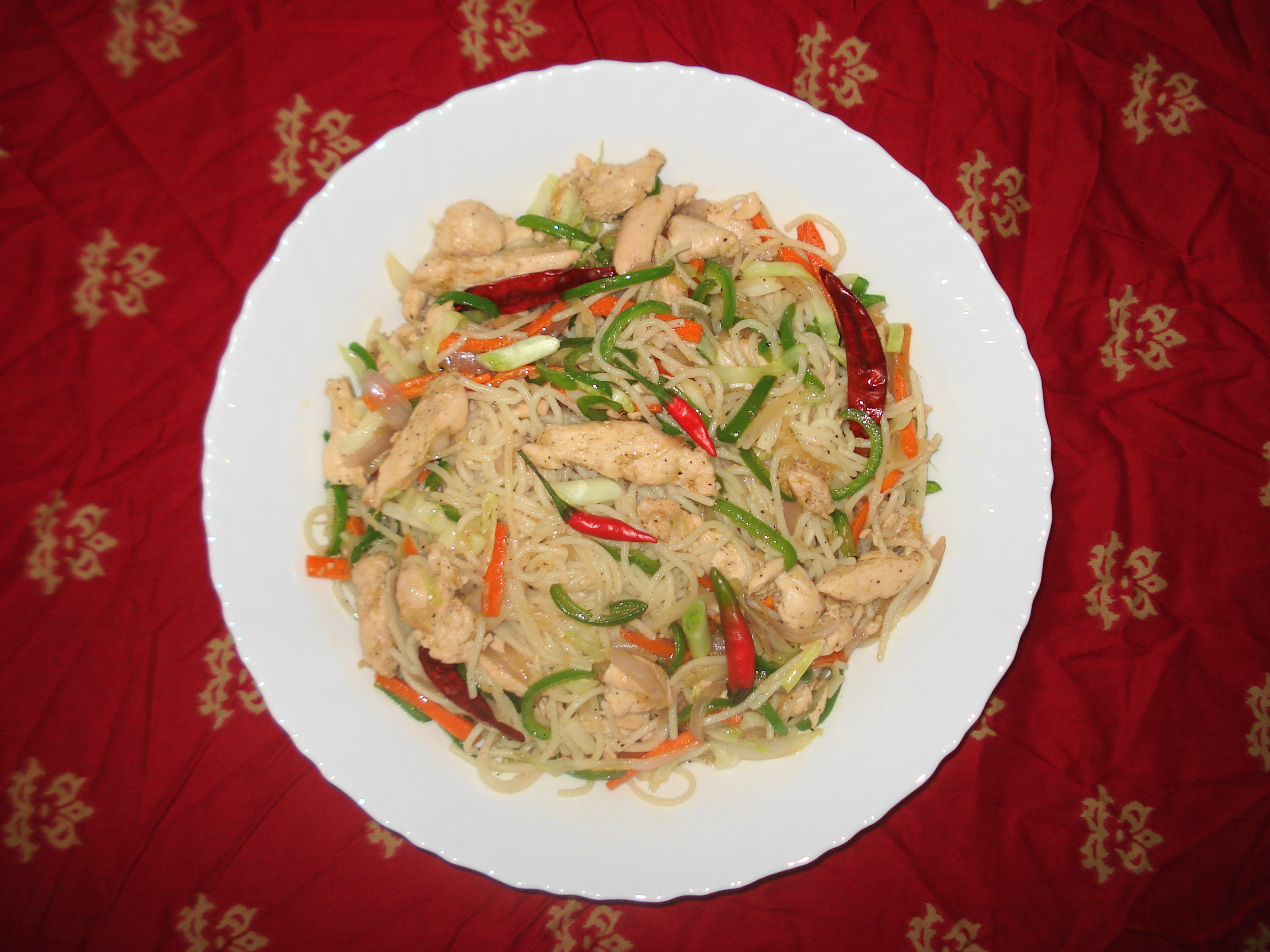
Nepalese-style hot chicken chow mein

Tibetans who settled in Nepal during the 1960s introduced chow mein into Nepal. It is a popular fast food in Nepal. The Newari people of the Kathmandu Valley use water buffalo meat and chicken in their cuisine, and chow mein in Nepal is often cooked with onion, vegetables and buff (water buffalo meat).

=== Peruvian Chinese cuisine ===
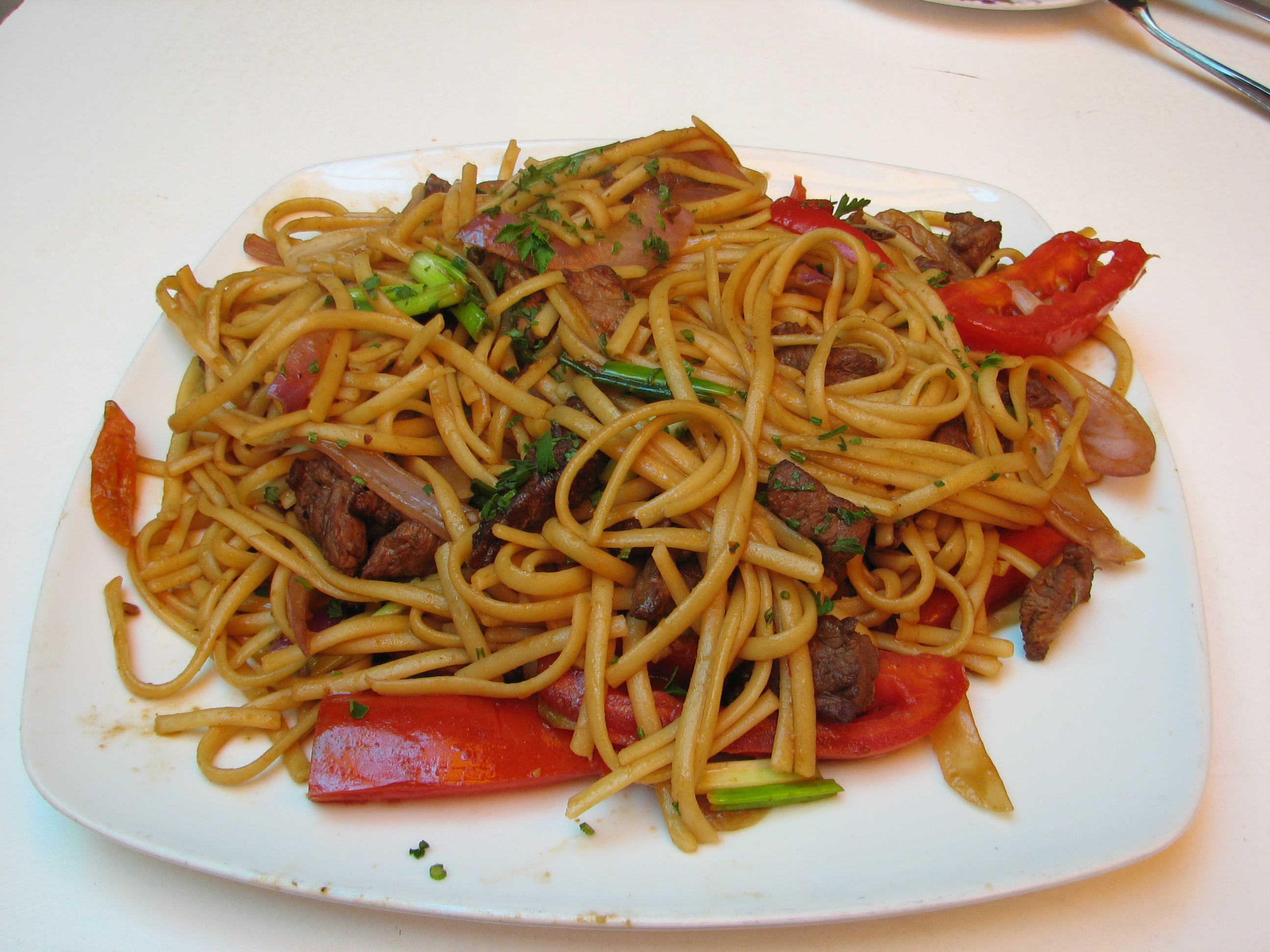
Peruvian tallarin saltado

Chinese food (chifa) is very popular in Peru and is now a part of mainstream Peruvian culture. Chow mein is known to Peruvians as tallarín saltado ("sautéed noodles") and may contain peppers, onions, green onions, and tomatoes. Chicken or beef are the preferred meats used in this Peruvian variant.

== See also ==
- Chinese noodles
- Chop suey
- Chow fun
- Chow mein sandwich
- Fried noodles
- List of Chinese dishes
- Lo mein
- Mein gon
- Mie goreng
- Pancit
- Yakisoba
