= Newfoundland chow mein =

Canadian Chinese dish

- Type: Stir fry
- Place of origin: Newfoundland and Labrador
- Associated cuisine: Canadian Chinese cuisine
- Serving temperature: Hot
- Main ingredients: Sliced cabbage; Vegetables; Meat

Newfoundland chow mein is a dish from Canadian Chinese cuisine. While traditional chow mein is a stir fried noodle dish, and its name means "fried noodles", Newfoundland chow mein includes cabbage strips instead of noodles.

== History ==
The dish was invented by Chinese chefs on Newfoundland who had difficulty obtaining traditional Chinese ingredients on the island. To replace egg noodles, they cut thin slices of cabbage as a substitute.

== Description ==
Newfoundland chow mein is a stir fry that features thin cabbage slices, vegetables and meat in a sauce made from a combination of soy sauce and oyster sauce. Common ingredients include carrots, onions, bok choy, pea shoots, gai lan, mushrooms, or rapini. Chicken, pork, shrimp, and beef are commonly included as the main protein in the dish. The flavor of the cabbage has been described as adding a more savory, umami flavor to the dish than traditional chow mein.
