= Ginger beef =

Canadian-Chinese beef dish

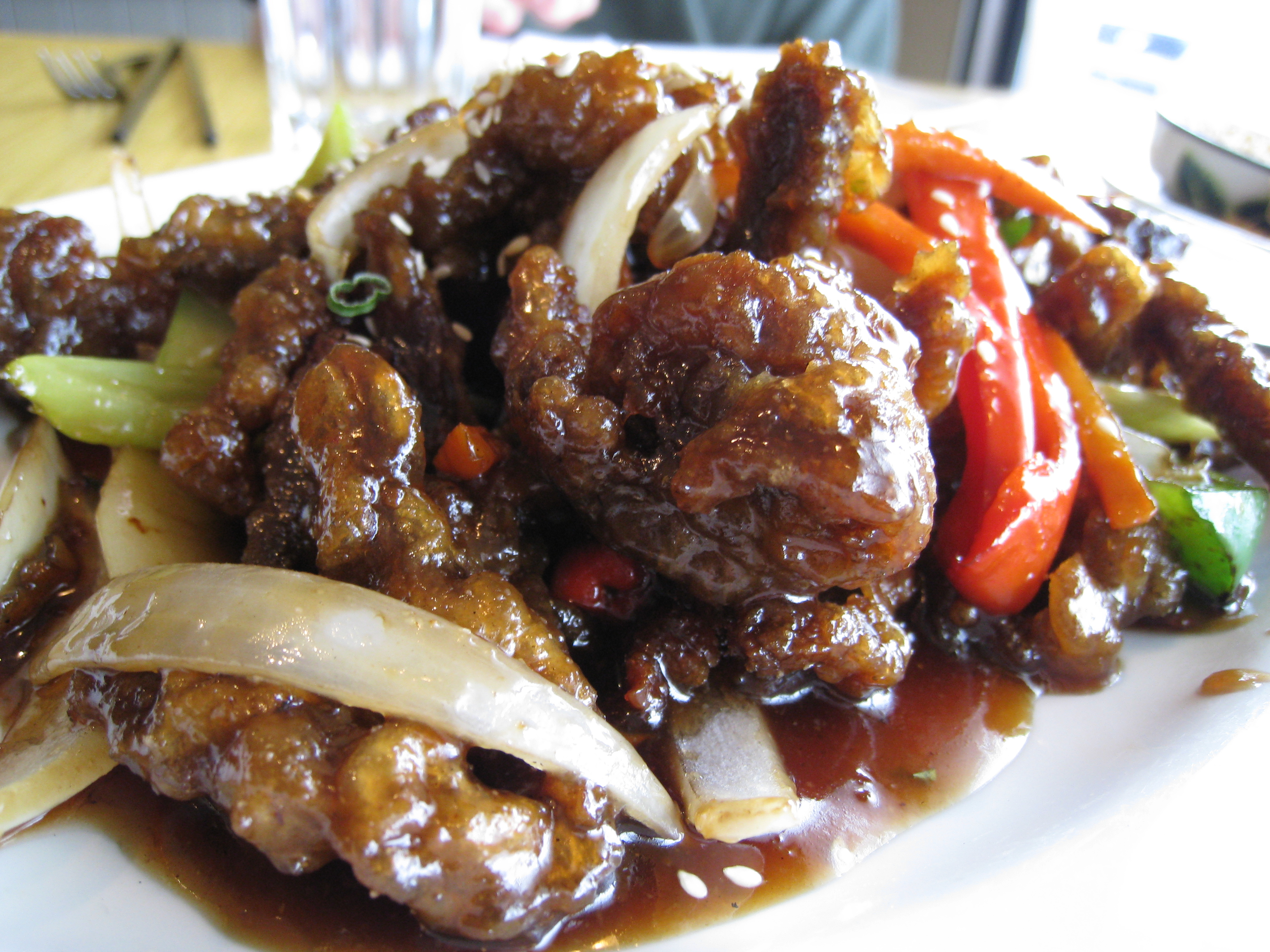
- Ginger beef served on a plate
- Course: Main dishes
- Place of origin: Canada
- Region or state: Alberta
- Main ingredients: Beef, ginger, sweet sauce
- Ingredients generally used: Garlic, hot peppers, sugar, soy sauce, cooking oil, cornstarch
- Variations: carrot, onion

Ginger beef is a Canadian Chinese dish made from beef, ginger, and a distinctive sweet sauce.

The ingredients of ginger beef can depend on where it is featured, but the Albertan version generally consists of deep fried strips of beef coated in a dark sweet sauce that is reminiscent of other Asian sauces based on vinegar and sugar. It also contains flavors of ginger, garlic, and hot peppers, and is commonly served with a small amount of julienned carrots and onions in the sauce. Ginger beef is derived from the original Geung Ngao Yuk (Chinese: 薑牛肉) dish.

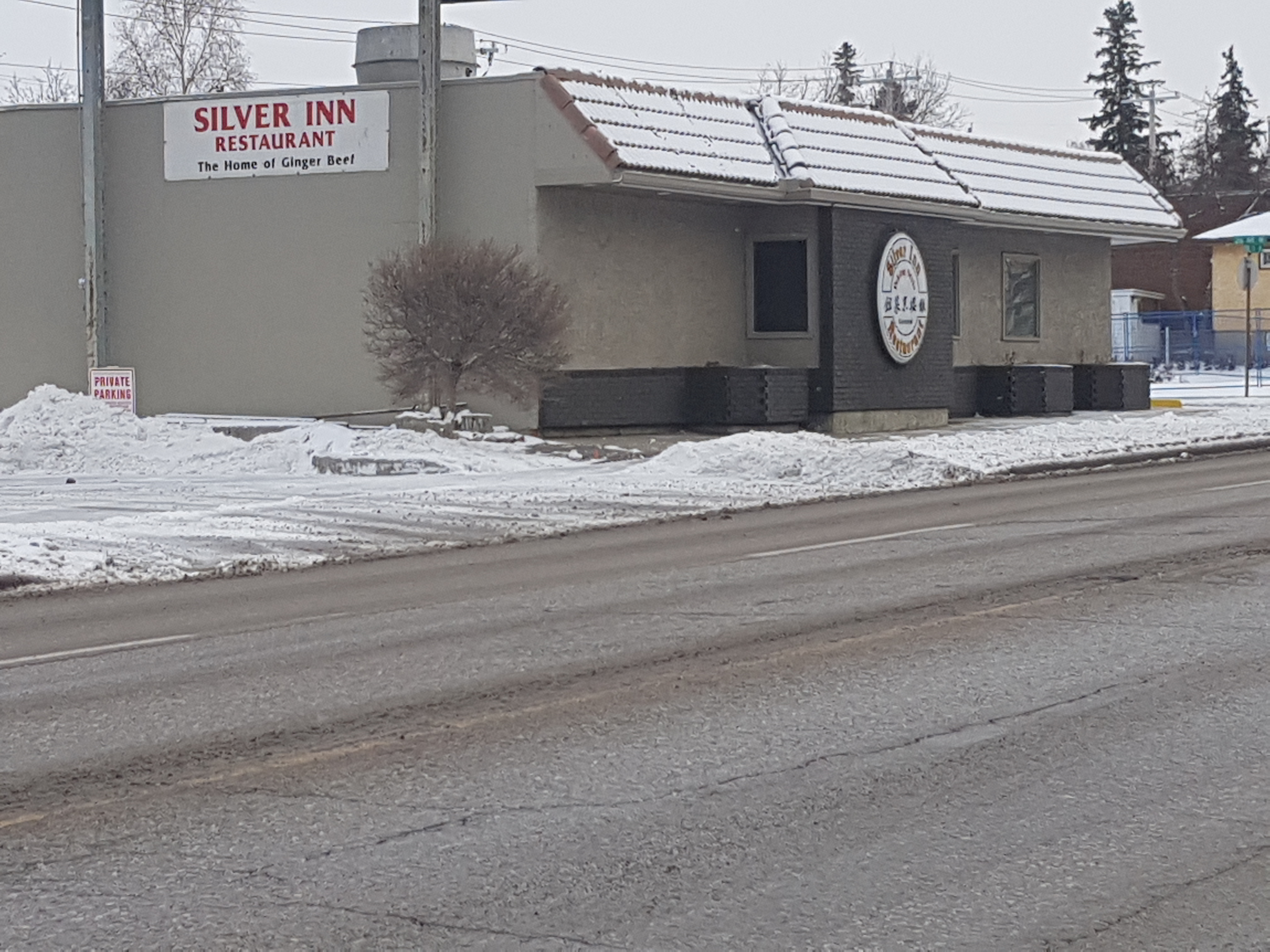
The Silver Inn, in Calgary

As with many dishes, the invention of ginger beef is claimed by several restaurants and chefs. However, the most widely accepted origin attributes the dish's development during the mid-1970s by chef George Wong at the Silver Inn in Calgary, Alberta. The dish is now a very common offering in Canadian Chinese restaurants. A radio segment featuring ginger beef was aired on CBC Radio One programme The Main Ingredient. In September 2022, the Silver Inn announced it would permanently close after serving the community for 45 years.

== See also ==
- List of Canadian inventions and discoveries
- Canadian cuisine
- List of beef dishes
