= Macaroni chinois =

Canadian Chinese dish

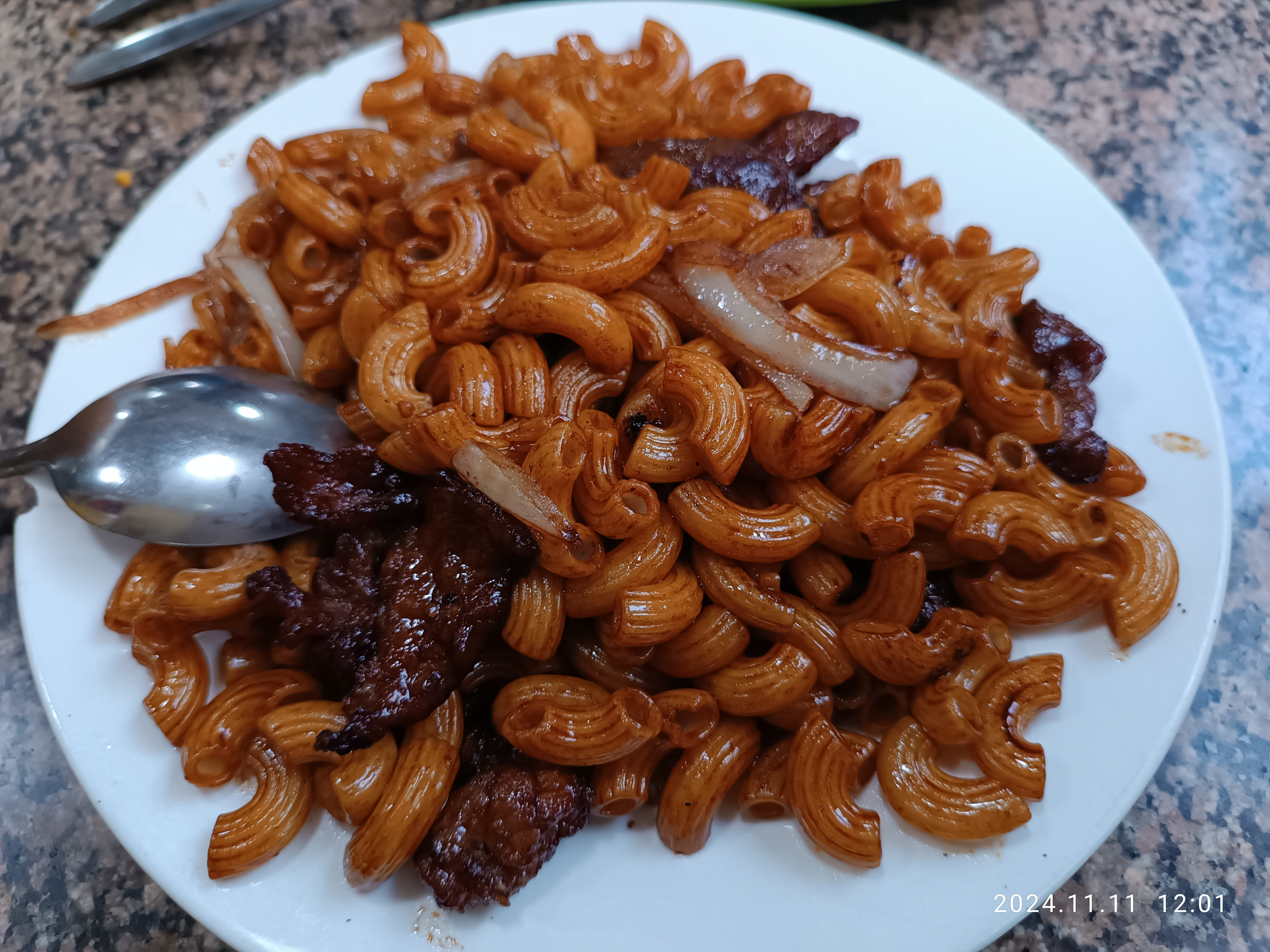
- Type: Stir fry
- Course: Main course
- Place of origin: Quebec City, Canada
- Associated cuisine: Canadian Chinese cuisine
- Serving temperature: Hot
- Main ingredients: Macaroni

Macaroni chinois (French: Chinese macaroni), sometimes called fried macaroni, is a dish from Canadian Chinese cuisine. The dish is commonly served in Chinese restaurants in Quebec. It was invented by Chinese restaurant owners in Quebec City during the mid-20th century to fit the tastes of local Canadian customers.

The dish is a local adaptation, rather than a traditional Chinese recipe, with soy sauce being the primary ingredient from Chinese cuisine.

== Description ==
It is a type of stir fry that consists of elbow macaroni with vegetables and meat, typically beef or pork in a sauce that contains soy sauce and Worcestershire sauce. Various recipes may call for onions, peppers, broccoli, carrots, celery or other vegetables.

== See also ==
- American chop suey
- American goulash
- Chinese Canadians
- Culture of Quebec
