= Chinatowns in Canada =

Chinatown
- Chinese: 唐人街
Transcriptions
Standard Mandarin
- Hanyu Pinyin: Tángrénjiē
Hakka
- Romanization: Tongˇ nginˇ gieˊ

Alternative Chinese name
- Traditional Chinese: 中國城
- Simplified Chinese: 中国城
Transcriptions
Standard Mandarin
- Hanyu Pinyin: Zhōngguóchéng
Hakka
- Romanization: Zungˊ guedˋ sangˇ

Second alternative Chinese name
- Traditional Chinese: 華埠
- Simplified Chinese: 华埠
Transcriptions
Standard Mandarin
- Hanyu Pinyin: Huábù
Hakka
- Romanization: Faˇ pu

Chinatowns in Canada generally exist in the large cities of Victoria, Vancouver, Ottawa, Calgary, Edmonton, Toronto, and Montreal, and existed in some smaller towns throughout the history of Canada. Prior to 1900, almost all Chinese were located in British Columbia, but have spread throughout Canada thereafter. From 1923 to 1967, immigration from China was suspended due to exclusion laws. In 1997, the handover of Hong Kong to China caused many from there to flee to Canada due to uncertainties. Between 1881 and 1884, over 17, 0000 Chinese immigrants arrived in Canada to build the Canadian pacific Railway, and later to maintain it. Canada had about 25 Chinatowns across the country between the 1930s to 1940s, some of which have ceased to exist.

== History ==
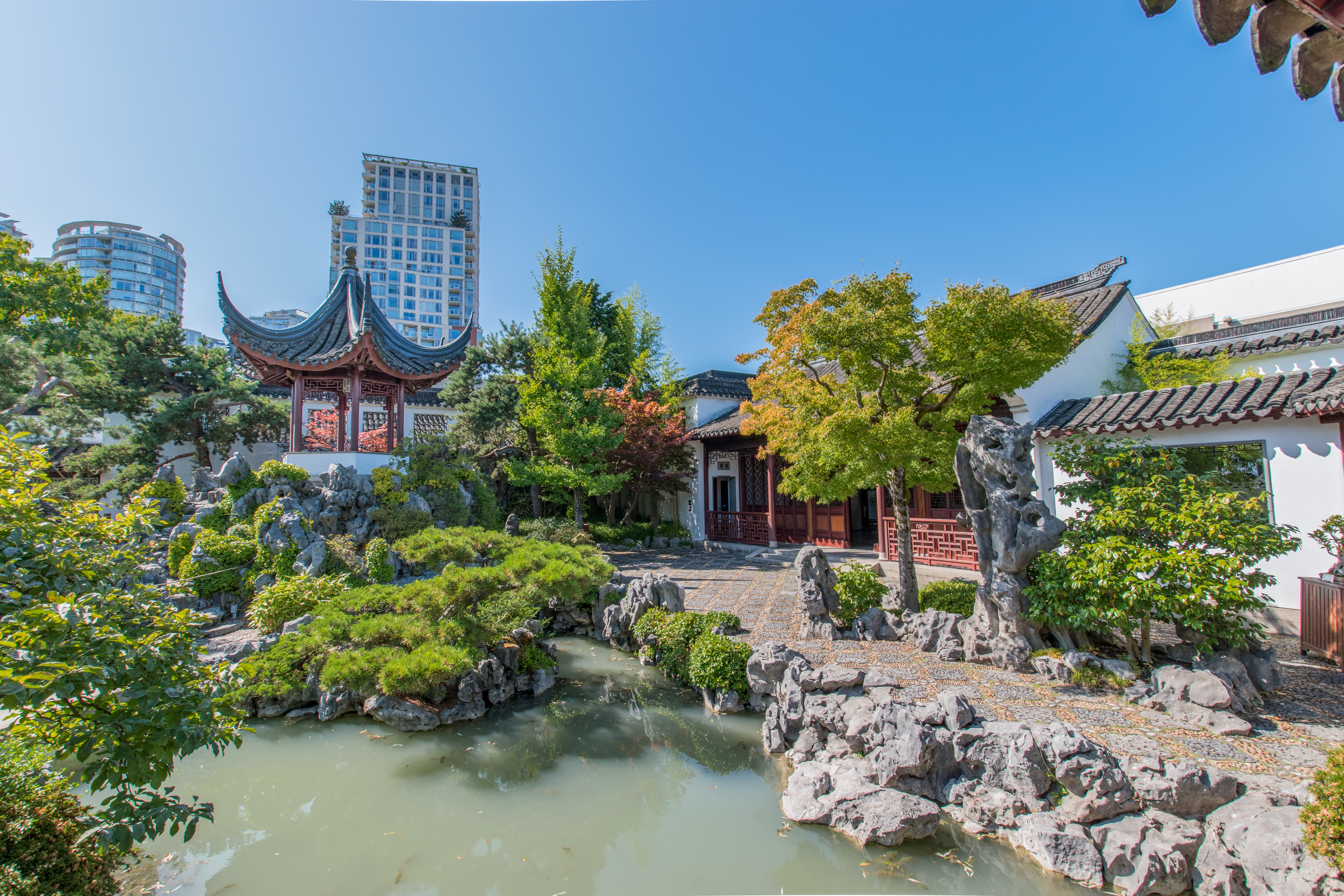
The Dr. Sun Yat-Sen Classical Chinese Garden in Vancouver's Chinatown is the first full-size Chinese or "scholars" garden built outside of China.

Chinatowns have existed in Canada since the 1850s, with the first recorded visit in 1788. The first Chinese landed on the Canadian west coast in 1788 and have integrated with the Canadian multicultural society. Chinatowns are one of the most prolific type of ethnic enclave found in major cities. These areas seemingly recreate an authentic Chinese experience within an urban community. During the first half of the 20th century, Chinatowns were associated with filth, seediness, and the derelict. By the late 20th century, Chinatown(s) had become areas worth preserving, a tourist attraction. They are now generally valued for their cultural significance and have become a feature of most large Canadian cities. Professor John Zucchi of McGill University states.

Unlike earlier periods when significant ethnic segregation might imply a lack of integration and therefore be viewed as a social problem, nowadays ethnic concentration in residential areas is a sign of vitality and indicates that multiculturalism as a social policy has been successful, that ethnic groups are retaining their identities if they so wish, and old-world cultures are being preserved at the same time that ethnic groups are being integrated. In addition these neighbourhoods, like their cultures, add to the definition of a city and point to the fact that integration is a two-way street."

Major timeline for Chinese Canadian history is:

- 1788 – First recorded Chinese visitor in Canada
- 1858 – Fraser River Gold Rush
- 1861 – First Chinese Canadian born
- 1872 – Disenfranchisement of Chinese in British Columbia
- 1880s – Canadian Pacific railway employs many Chinese
- 1923 – Chinese exclusion laws passed, causes hardships for Chinese Canadians
- 1947 – Chinese franchised, many entered into politics
- 1967 – Immigration from China liberalized

== Demographics ==
Canadians of Chinese descent, including mixed Chinese and other ethnic origins, make up about four percent of the Canadian population, or about 1.3 million people as of 2006. The Chinese Canadian community is the largest ethnic group of Asian Canadians, consisting approximately 40% of the Asian Canadian population. Most of them are concentrated within the provinces of Ontario and British Columbia. The five metropolitan areas with the largest Chinese Canadian populations are the Greater Toronto Area (537,060), Greater Vancouver (402,000), Greater Montreal (120,000), Calgary Region (75,410), and the Edmonton Capital Region (53,670).

== Alberta ==
=== Edmonton ===
Chinatown and Little Italy is a business improvement area (BIA), created by the City of Edmonton, roughly comprising the informal Chinatown and Little Italy ethnic enclaves in the city's inner neighbourhoods. The boundaries of the BIA includes only the "commercial strips" within those enclaves, and the BIA itself straddles the official neighbourhoods of McCauley and Boyle Street.

=== Calgary ===
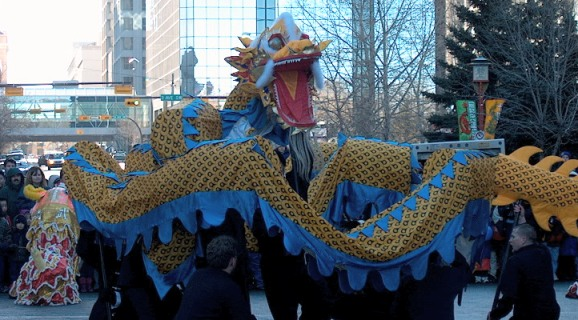
Chinese Dragon Dance in Calgary Chinatown

The Chinatown in Calgary is the largest in Alberta. It spans 1 St E westward to 10 St W and from the Bow River southward to 4 Ave SW. This Chinatown consists of a large shopping center called Dragon City Mall and a Calgary Chinese Cultural Centre located at 1 St SW. Nearly all of this is post-1930s, as Calgary's original Chinatown was little more than a handful of "Chinese and Western" restaurants in the same area, without the historic Chinese-ethnic residential-commercial quality of more historic Chinatowns like those in Vancouver and Victoria.

=== Lethbridge ===
Lethbridge has the remains of a once thriving Chinatown. The Kuomintang and Chinese Freemasons buildings are about all that remain on 2 Ave South near 4 Street South. By the 1960s, Chinese residents began moving out of the area, and by the end of the 20th century, all but one resident—Albert Leong, owner of Bow On Tong—had moved out, and Chinatown was reduced to one block with only a handful of buildings.

== British Columbia ==
=== Vancouver ===
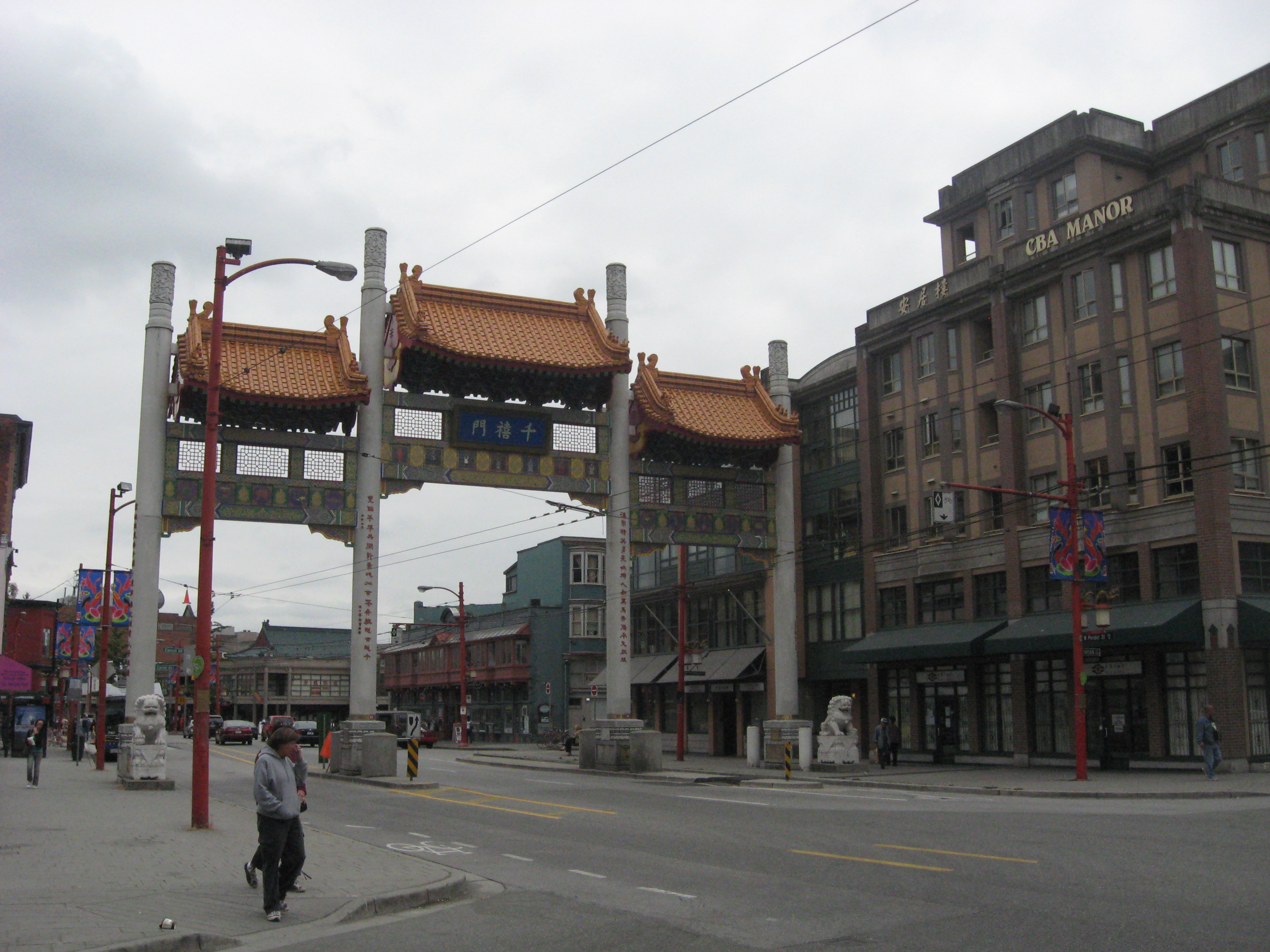
Millennium Gate on Pender Street in Vancouver's Chinatown

Chinatown in Vancouver, British Columbia is Canada's largest Chinatown. Centred on Pender Street, it is surrounded by Gastown and the Downtown Financial and Central Business Districts to the west, the Downtown Eastside to the north, the remnant of old Japantown to the northeast, and the residential neighbourhood of Strathcona to the east. The approximate street borders of Chinatown's official area as designated by the City of Vancouver are the alley between Pender Street and Hastings, Georgia, Gore, and Taylor Streets,

=== Victoria ===
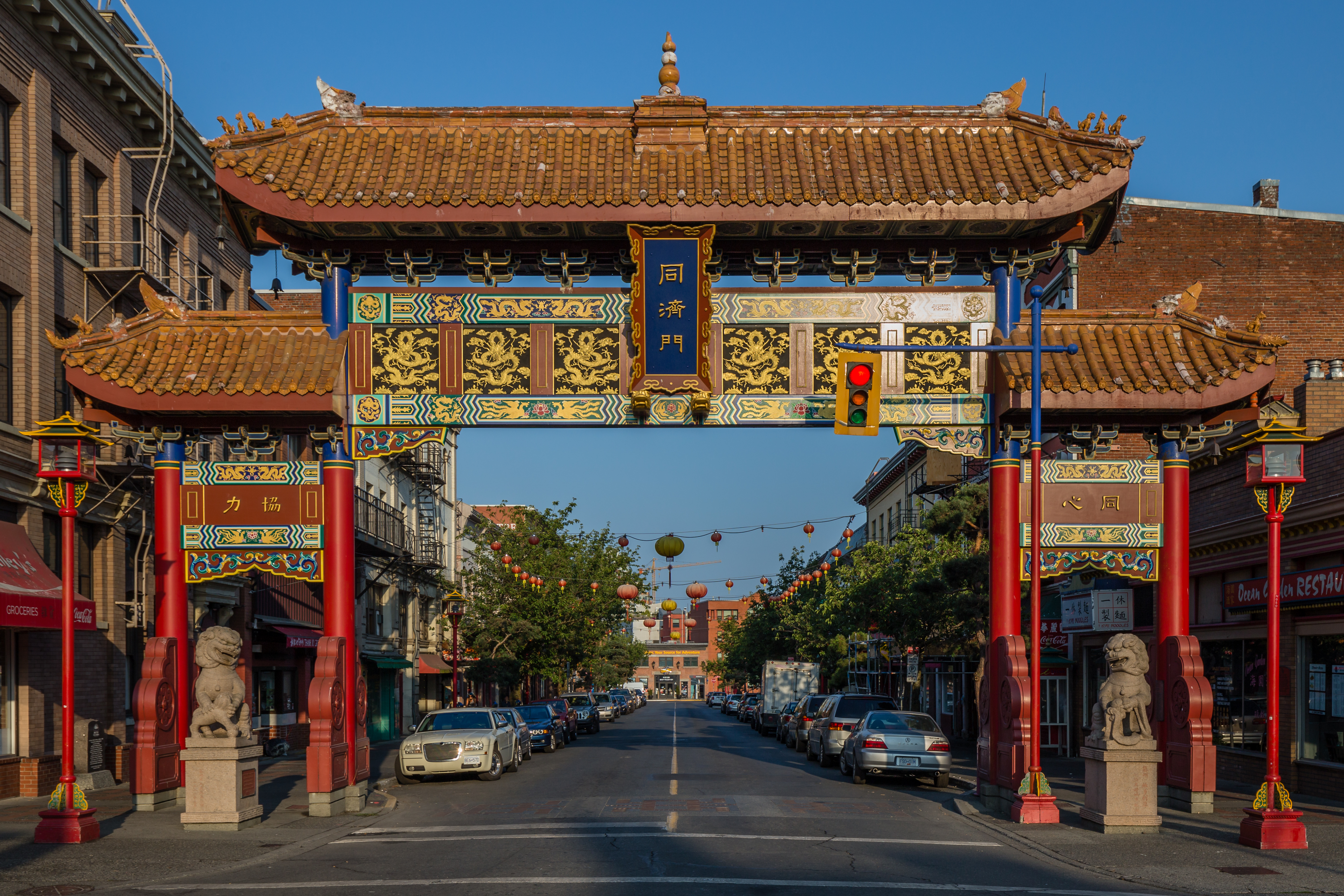
Entrance to Victoria's Chinatown.

The Chinatown in Victoria, British Columbia is the oldest in Canada and second in age only to San Francisco's in North America, with its beginnings in the mass influx of miners from California to what is now British Columbia in 1858. Its history goes back to the mid nineteenth century. It remains an active place for Chinese-Canadians, Victoria residents and tourists. Victoria's Chinatown is now surrounded by cultural, entertainment venues as well as being a venue itself.

=== Other Chinatowns in British Columbia ===
- New Westminster's Chinatown disappeared after 1898 fire.
- Cumberland's Chinatown – once the second-largest on the West Coast of North America (c.1910) and disappeared in the 1970s.
- Historical Chinatowns in Nanaimo
- Barkerville, British Columbia – home to 3,000 Chinese during the Cariboo Gold Rush
- Stanley, British Columbia – a gold-mining community near Barkerville which became the largest town in the Cariboo goldfields after Barkerville's decline. In 1900 well over half its population was Chinese. Other towns in the Cariboo goldfields were also noticeably Chinese in composition – Richfield, Antler and others. Settlements in other areas which had Chinatowns, or which became predominantly Chinese for some of their lifespan, were Hazelton, Boston Bar, Lillooet, Rock Creek, Granite Creek and Fisherville (Wild Horse Creek). Cities which had now-vanished Chinatowns included Nanaimo and Penticton.

== Manitoba ==
=== Winnipeg ===
Chinatown in Winnipeg, Manitoba was formed in 1909. Located on King Street between James and Higgins Avenues, it was officially recognized in 1968. Winnipeg's Chinatown is home to many shops and restaurants including Asian grocery stores and an herbal products store.

== Nova Scotia ==
Nova Scotia is aggressively trying to tackle its population crunch by attracting skilled workers, and calls China a "key market" for immigration leading to the formation of a small Chinatown in Halifax.

== Ontario ==
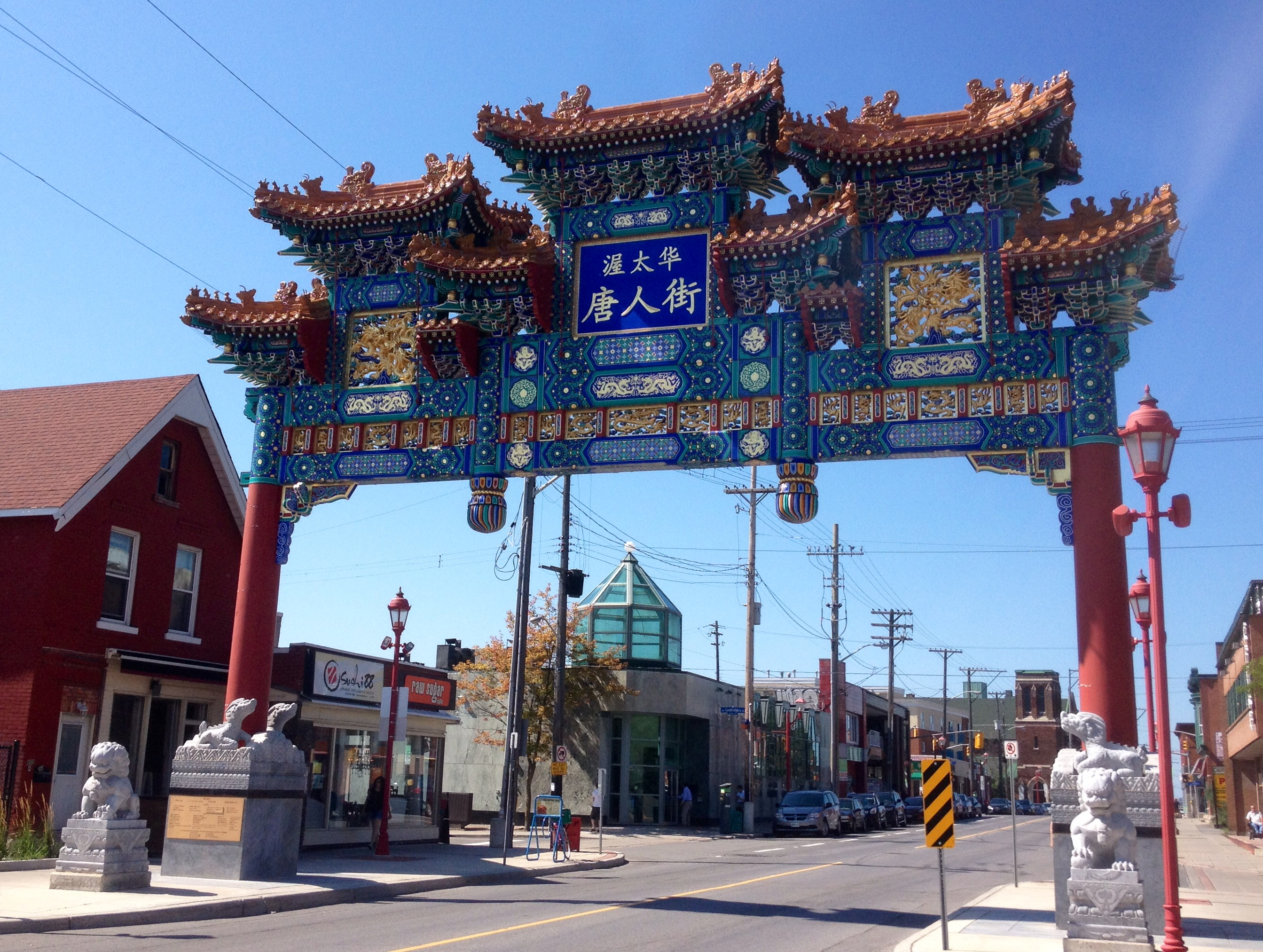
Gates to Ottawa's Chinatown

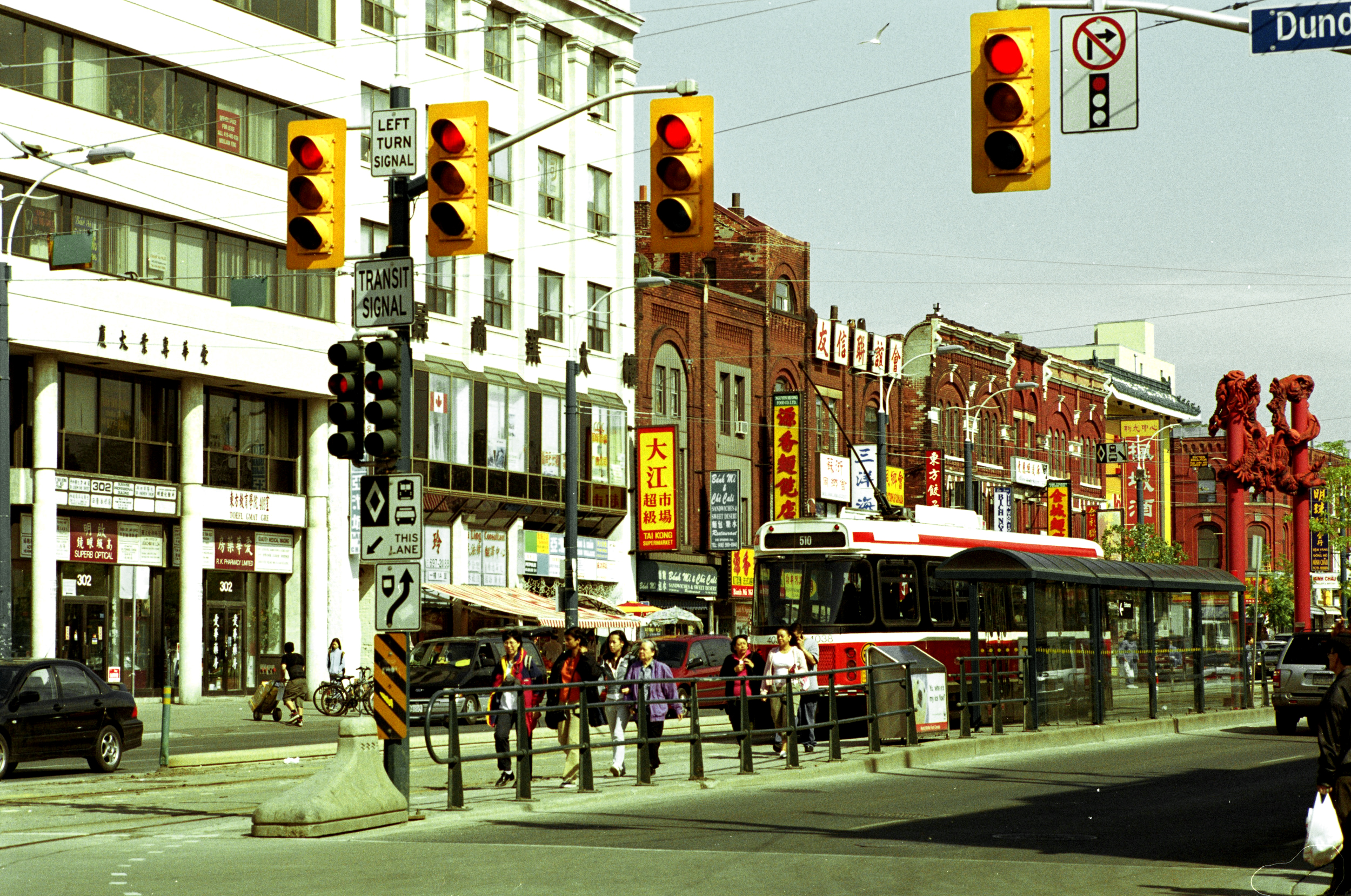
View of Chinatown, Toronto on Spadina Avenue.

=== Ottawa ===
Ottawa's Chinatown is located along Somerset Street in downtown Ottawa. It runs from Bay Street in the east to Rochester St in the west (according to the Chinatown BIA). Signs for Chinatown continue along Somerset until Preston Street, and Chinese/Asian restaurants can be found even further west.

=== Toronto ===
Greater Toronto has several cities with concentrated Chinese neighbourhoods and Chinatowns. Toronto's Downtown Chinatown has a high concentration of ethnic Chinese residents and businesses extending along Dundas Street West and Spadina Avenue, which was created as a response to the expropriation of the city's First Chinatown. The development of this downtown Chinatown led to the development of Toronto's East Chinatown. Toronto's present downtown Chinatown developed in the late 19th century and is now one of the largest Chinese-Canadian communities in the Greater Toronto Area. Toronto's neighbouring cities of Mississauga and Markham also host a number of large Chinese business centres, plazas and malls, albeit no single defined Chinatown. The city also has a Koreatown, along Bloor St West for Korean Canadians and a Little Japan along Dundas St West of Yonge St.

=== Windsor ===
Windsor's West Side neighborhood is home to a Chinatown. Many Asians Americans who long for Chinese food from Detroit often visit this Chinatown, alongside Chicago and Toronto.

=== Other Chinatowns in Ontario ===
Hamilton and Sudbury (formerly on Borgia Street in Sudbury were Chinese restaurants and laundries that disappeared in the late 1960s with urban renewal of what is now Elm Place shopping mall). were also once home to a Chinatown.

== Quebec ==
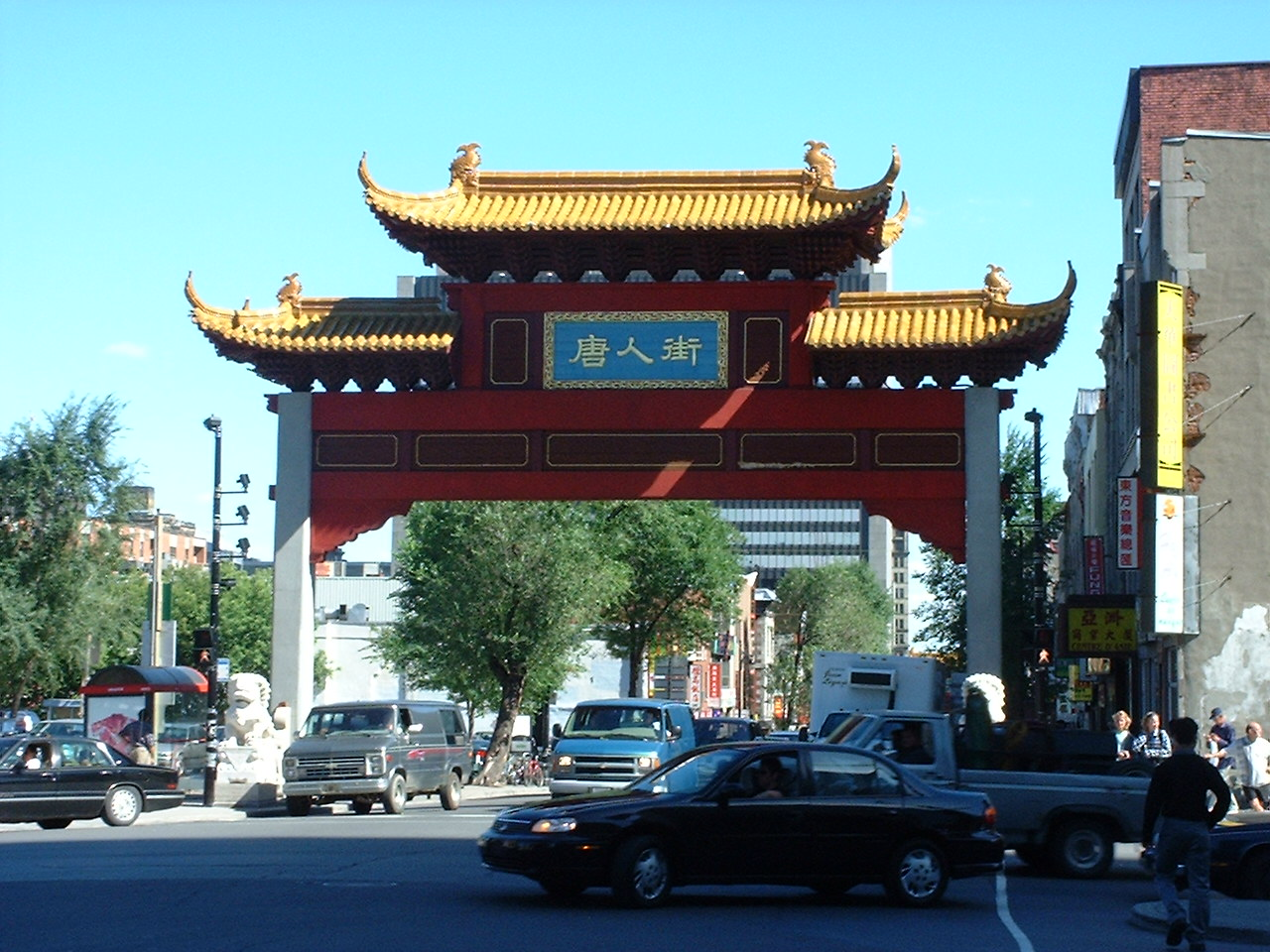
The gate on boulevard Saint-Laurent, Montreal

=== Montreal ===
Chinatown in Montreal is located in the area of De la Gauchetière Street in Montreal. The neighbourhood contains many Asian restaurants, food markets, and convenience stores as well being home to many of Montreal's East Asian community centres, such as the Montreal Chinese Hospital and the Montreal Chinese Community and Cultural Center.

=== Quebec City ===
There was once a Chinatown on Côte d'Abraham in Quebec City, but Autoroute Dufferin-Montmorency cuts through what was once its location. Historically, it paled in size in contrast to its somewhat larger counterpart in Montreal. The first Chinese residents arrived in the late 19th century with area peaking in the 1940s and 1950s. Some restaurants and a few Chinese residents remain but scattered beyond the former Chinatown area. Most of them moved to either Montreal or Toronto.

== Saskatchewan ==
=== Moose Jaw ===
Moose Jaw was once home to a Chinatown, which existed on River Street West. Moose Jaw's Chinatown initially had 160 Chinese and then grew to 957 by 1911. By the 1920s and 1930s, Moose Jaw's Chinatown was the largest in Saskatchewan with a population of more than 300. More than half of the restaurants in Moose Jaw were owned by Chinese and all but one laundromat was owned by the Chinese. However, the attitudes of the time reflected much racism and discrimination against the Chinese population that they were even barred from participating in government.

=== Regina ===
Regina's Chinatown is found on 11th Avenue between Broad Street and Winnipeg Street. It features red bilingual street signs (in contrast to the standard English-only blue signs) and a few Asian groceries.

=== Saskatoon ===
In Saskatoon, the Riversdale district has a historical Chinese settlement dating back to the early 20th century, where Chinese immigrants were employed by the Grand Trunk Pacific Railway, and established businesses within this district. Riversdale is currently home to many Chinese restaurants and stores.

==== Other Chinatowns in Saskatchewan ====
Other Chinatowns existed in Swift Current and Battleford.

== See also ==
- Hong Kong Canadians
- Chinese Immigration Act of 1885
- Canadian Chinese cuisine
- Chinatowns in the United States
