= Canadian Chinese cuisine =

Chinese cuisine developed by Chinese Canadians

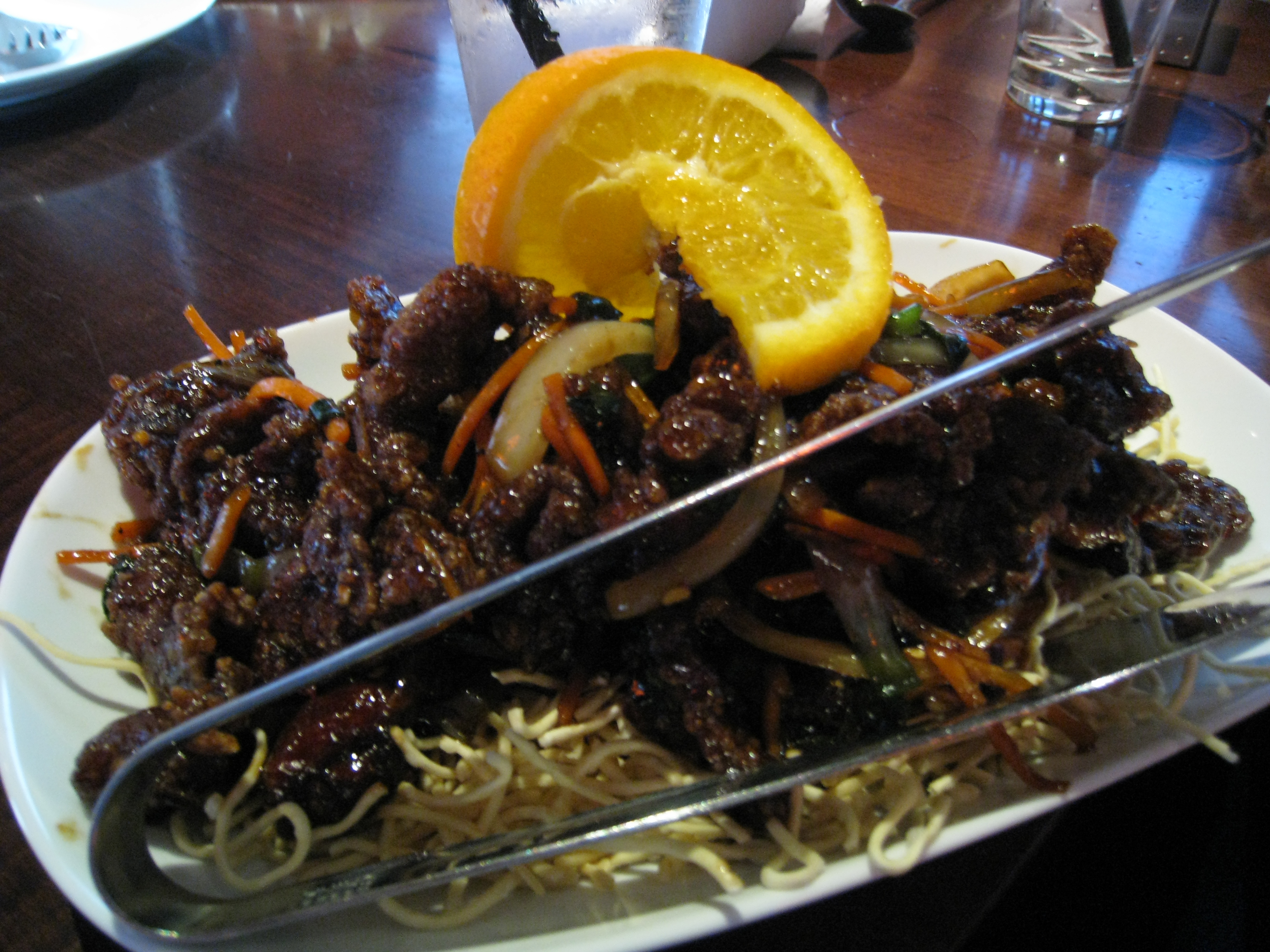
Ginger beef, a well-known Canadian Chinese dish

Canadian Chinese cuisine is a cuisine derived from Chinese cuisine that was developed by Chinese Canadians. It was the first form of commercially available Chinese food in Canada. This cooking style was invented by early Cantonese immigrants who adapted traditional Chinese recipes to Western tastes and the available ingredients, and developed in a similar process to American Chinese cuisine.

== History ==
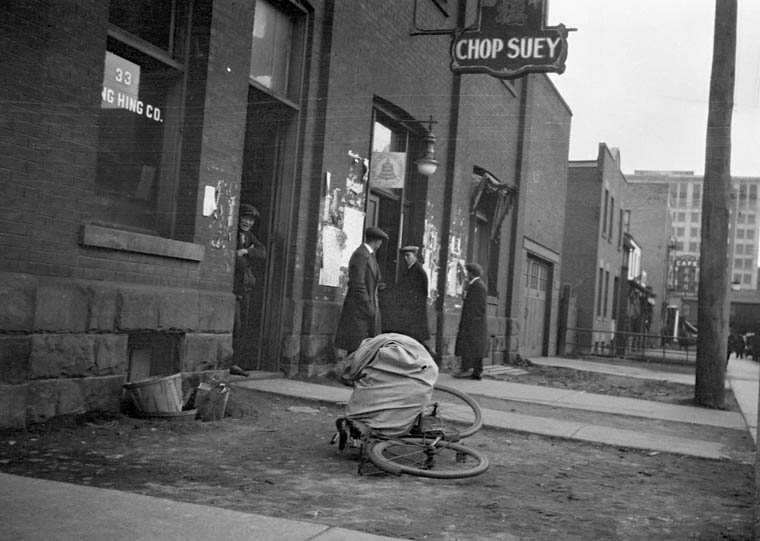
Signage in Toronto's First Chinatown for chop suey in 1923

Canadian Chinese cuisine originated in the mid-19th century, primarily in Western Canada and the Canadian Prairies, among Chinese immigrants who moved to Canada, and among Chinese labourers working on the Canadian Pacific Railway between Vancouver, British Columbia, and Montreal, Quebec. Many labourers who remained in Canada after the railway's completion opened small inexpensive "Chinese cafés" or worked as cooks in mining and logging camps, canneries, and in the private homes of the upper classes in cities and towns. In British Columbia, a form of buffet known as the "Chinese smörgåsbord" developed in pre-railway Gastown (the settlement that later became Vancouver) when Scandinavian loggers and millworkers encouraged their Chinese cooks to turn a sideboard into a steam table, instead of bringing plates of single dishes to the dining table.

Due to common anti-Chinese sentiment at the time, as well as the Chinese Immigration Act, 1885 and 1923, many Chinese immigrants were unable to work in businesses other than restaurants or laundries. Many restaurants were opened, despite their owners having little prior cooking experience. These restaurants were often established in small towns and rural areas where residents, predominantly European Canadians, already did not have gathering places of their own, and where the cook/owner could very well be the only Asian person in the community. Chinese restaurant owners thus often had to modify their menus to appeal to the Western tastes of Canadians; many Chinese-owned restaurants offered very limited selections of Chinese dishes, sometimes even omitting them entirely in favour of Western dishes that were more familiar to their customer bases.

Chinese restaurants also served as gathering places for the early Chinese Canadian community, especially among immigrants whose families could not emigrate with them due to the Chinese Immigration Acts. It was only after the Chinese Immigration Act was repealed in 1947 that Chinese dishes on restaurant menus became commonplace, and the general public became more interested in Chinese cuisine.

Limitations and cost factors relating to the ingredients available to Chinese Canadians affected the development of Canadian Chinese cuisine, since traditional Chinese ingredients were unavailable or too difficult to grow. For example, the reason carrots, celery, and bean sprouts are used more often in Canadian Chinese cuisine compared to Chinese cuisine is because of their ease in growing and availability, with bean sprouts in particular only requiring "a bucket and a water source".

A number of iconic Chinese restaurants were opened in the mid-20th century, though a number of them are defunct as of 2023. Restaurateur Bill Wong (father of journalist Jan Wong) reportedly opened Montreal's first Chinese buffet restaurant, House of Wong, on Queen Mary Road in the heavily-Jewish Snowdon district in the 1950s. He later opened Bill Wong's on nearby Decarie Boulevard in 1962. In 1975, Louise Tang and Lily Wong opened the Silver Inn in Calgary, where chef George Wong invented ginger beef in an attempt to combine the appeal of crunchy french fries, sweet-and-sour ketchup, and Albertan beef.

Further Cantonese immigration to Canada began anew in the 1960s, and was ignited in the 1980s and 1990s in anticipation of the handover of Hong Kong to China. This resulted in many Hongkongers relocating to other countries, but their most preferred was Canada, the preference resulting from Canada's immigration policy, high standard of living, established Chinese community, and membership in the Commonwealth. In contrast, the United States tended to accept more mainland or Taiwanese Chinese, while imposing immigration quotas on Commonwealth territories such as Hong Kong.

Today, Chinese Canadians are one of the largest visible minority groups in Canada, and Chinatowns are in every major Canadian city except Quebec City, with those in Toronto, Vancouver, Montreal, and Calgary being the largest. Richmond, British Columbia, and Markham, Ontario, both have significant Chinese Canadian populations, with a large number of Chinese restaurants in and around their respective cities. Increasing Chinese immigration, interest in Asian cuisine, and Canadian multiculturalism has created a demand for authentic Chinese cuisine, and many newer Chinese restaurants in Canada offer authentic Cantonese, Hakka, and Sichuan cuisine, among others, with Canadian Chinese dishes typically also available.

== Canadian Chinese restaurants ==
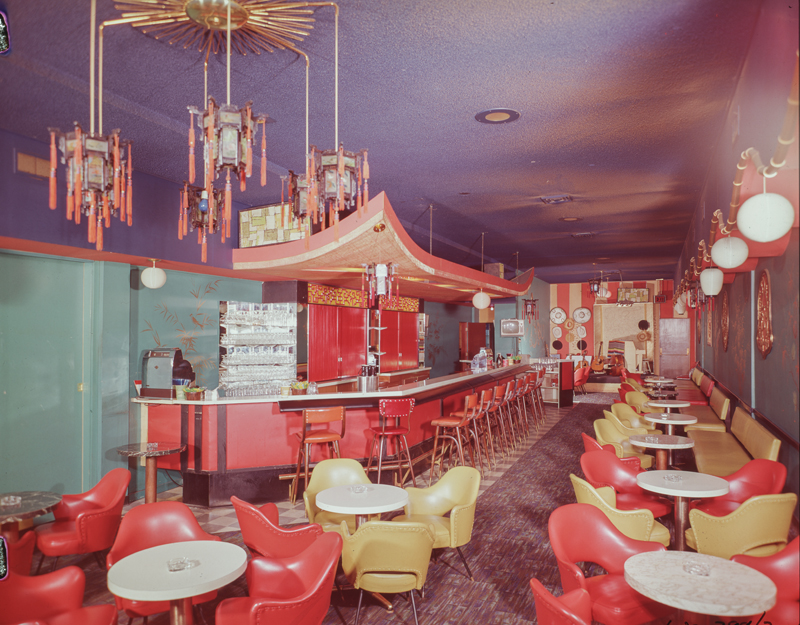
Seven Seas Restaurant, Edmonton, Alberta, 1967

A vast majority of towns and cities in most of Canada have at least one Canadian Chinese restaurant. Many towns that cannot support a single franchise restaurant still have at least one thriving Chinese restaurant. Many independent restaurants in larger cities have found their business shrinking as delivery chains and buffets squeeze out traditional sit-down restaurants.

Smaller and more rural settlements in northern regions of the provinces, as well as across the Prairies, tend to feature Chinese restaurants that also serve Western cuisine, often relics of when such menus were necessary for business. In Glendon, Alberta, for example, next to a roadside model of the world's largest pierogi (a staple of Ukrainian cuisine) is the Perogy Café, a Vietnamese Canadian-owned restaurant specializing in both Ukrainian pierogies and Chinese jiaozi.

Canadian Chinese chop suey houses are predominantly in non-immigrant neighbourhoods catering to non-Chinese customers. They are now most often mixed with those featuring the more traditional cuisines. Canadian Chinese restaurants are not limited to these areas and can often be found even at the farthest outskirts of the metropolitan areas. Because of the popularity of Canadian Chinese food, even some of the older authentic Chinese restaurants may offer Canadian Chinese dishes to cater to non-Chinese customers.

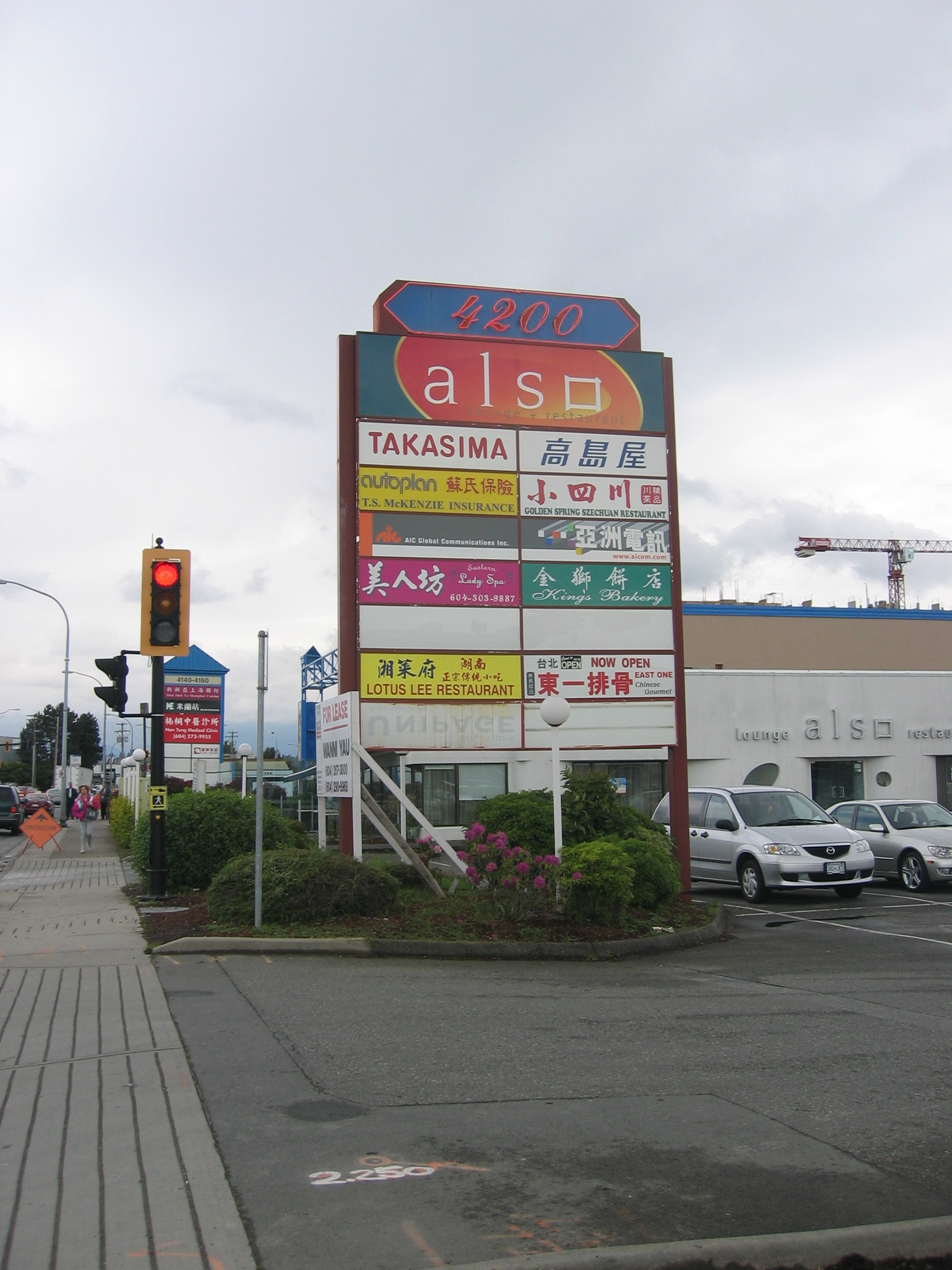
A sign for businesses, including Canadian Chinese restaurants, in the Golden Village. The Golden Village holds the largest concentration of Chinese restaurants in North America.

Restaurants in the newer Chinatowns, particularly in Vancouver and Toronto, tend to cater to recent Asian immigrants and offer more varied fare; Sichuan, Hakka, Chiuchow, Taiwanese, and even Buddhist cuisine restaurants can be found there. One of the largest concentration of Chinese restaurants in North America is in the Golden Village area in Richmond, a suburb of Vancouver. The seafood served here is from the British Columbian coast.

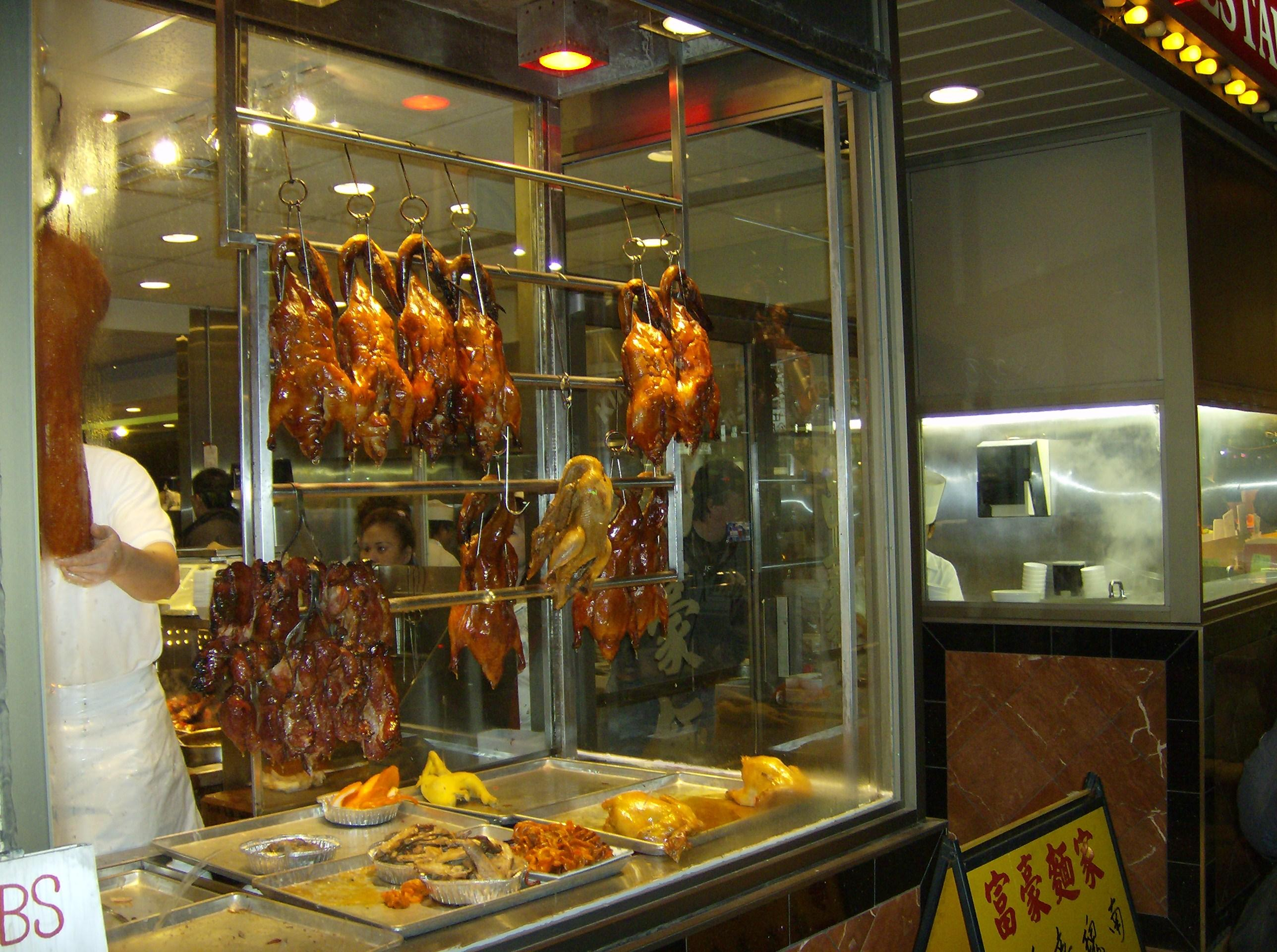
Roasted geese on display in Toronto's Old Chinatown

Toronto's Old Chinatown has seen most of the once-famed restaurants on Dundas Street and Spadina Avenue close since the late 1990s, especially the siu mei barbecue shops on Dundas Street that were located below grade. The 1990s also saw the closure of demise of Hsin Huang (or Hsin Kuang), a three-restaurant chain in the Greater Toronto Area. These restaurants, one at Chinese Centre at 888 Dundas Street East in Mississauga, another at Finch Avenue and Kennedy Road in Scarborough, and their four-storey flagship location at Spadina Avenue and St. Andrew Street (just north of Dundas Street) in old Toronto Chinatown, were decorated inside with the traditional red and yellow colours of the Fenghuang (a mythical bird) while the exterior was yellow and had a green Oriental roof.

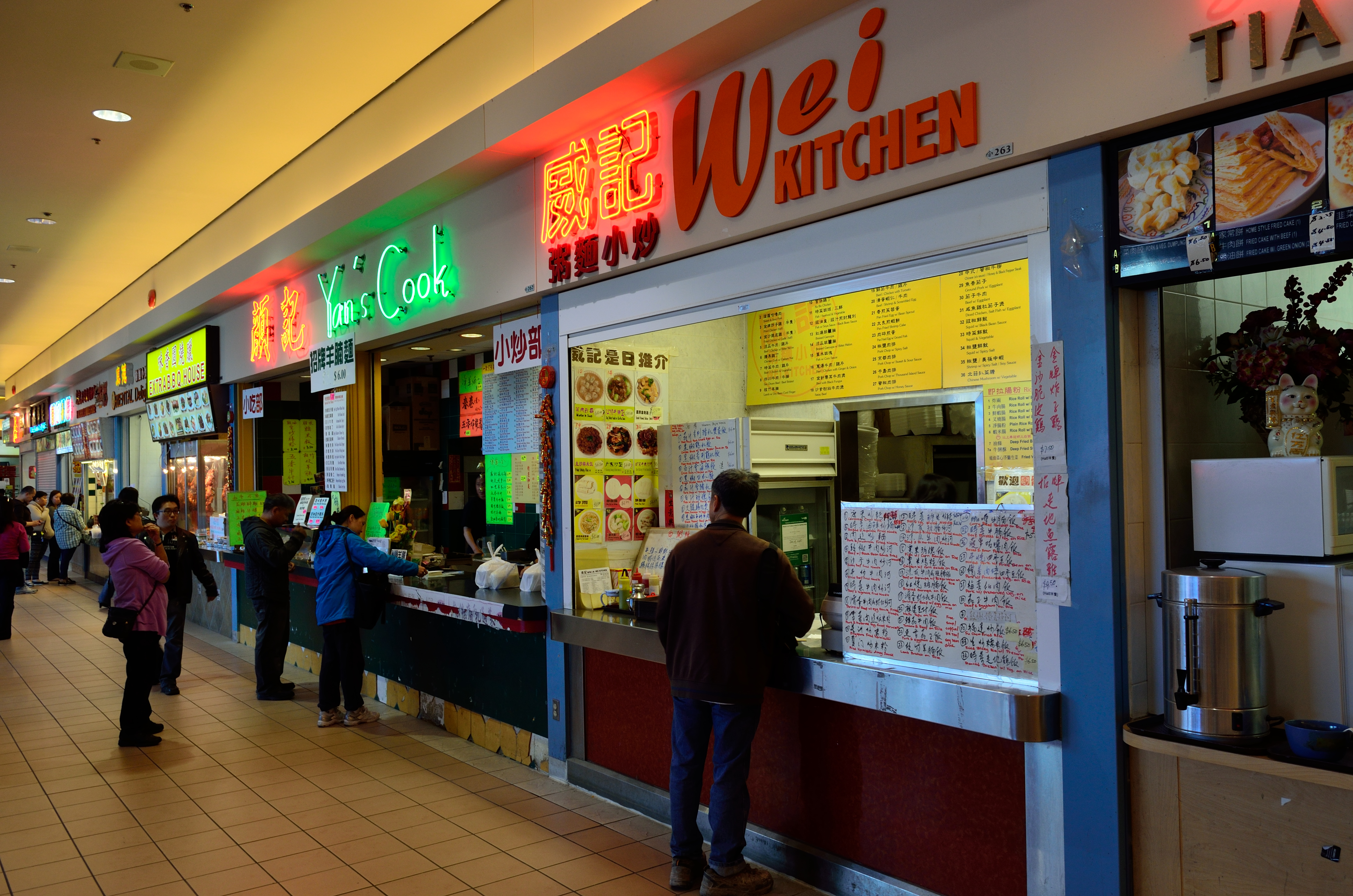
An Asian food court at First Markham Place in Markham, Ontario

In the newer suburban areas of the Greater Toronto Area, such as Highway 7 in Richmond Hill and Markham, the Chinese restaurants range from small eateries, siu mei shops, and bakeries in Chinese strip malls and food courts, to the all-you-can-eat buffets that often expand beyond Chinese Canadian to incorporate Asian fusion (including Japanese, Korean, and Thai), to the larger and more expensive places that often function as banquet halls with ten-course meals available. Among upscale restaurants, the older places will often have the traditional Chinese décor, which is red and yellow colours with the Fenghuang (Chinese dragon and phoenix) adorning the wall behind the dais, while newer establishments tend to be decorated in a more Western contemporary style.

Many Chinese fine dining restaurants and banquet halls offer discounted dim sum lunches on weekdays and early weekends or to seniors, though this is a low margin segment, and their main earnings come from hosting weddings or other functions. Observers have noted that dim sum "cart service is a dying breed in Toronto, as more and more restaurants have switched over to a list-based dining experience. There are a few notable places where you can still witness these magical culinary carts being rolled out in front of you; and where you order by using your pointer finger, not a pen and paper."

Although most restaurants are independent businesses, there are some chains such as Manchu Wok (eight provinces), Hons Wonton House (metro Vancouver), Kirin Chinese Restaurant (metro Vancouver), Congee Queen (Toronto, Peel, and York regions), and Mandarin Restaurant (southern Ontario). Ho-Lee-Chow, a pun on the expression holy cow, franchised to six provinces between its 1989 launch and 2009 closure. The Regal Palace chain of four restaurants, owned by Yuk Yee Ellen Pun and Patsy Lai, went bankrupt and ceased operations in 2013 while owing 60 employees $676,000 in unpaid wages. Imitation restaurants include Ding Tai Fung (intentionally similar to Din Tai Fung) in First Markham Place and Hutaoli Music Restaurant & Bar in Bridlewood Mall.

Le Piment Rouge, a fine dining restaurant founded in Montreal around 1980, set itself apart as one of the few Chinese fine dining restaurants in Montreal at the time.

== Culture ==
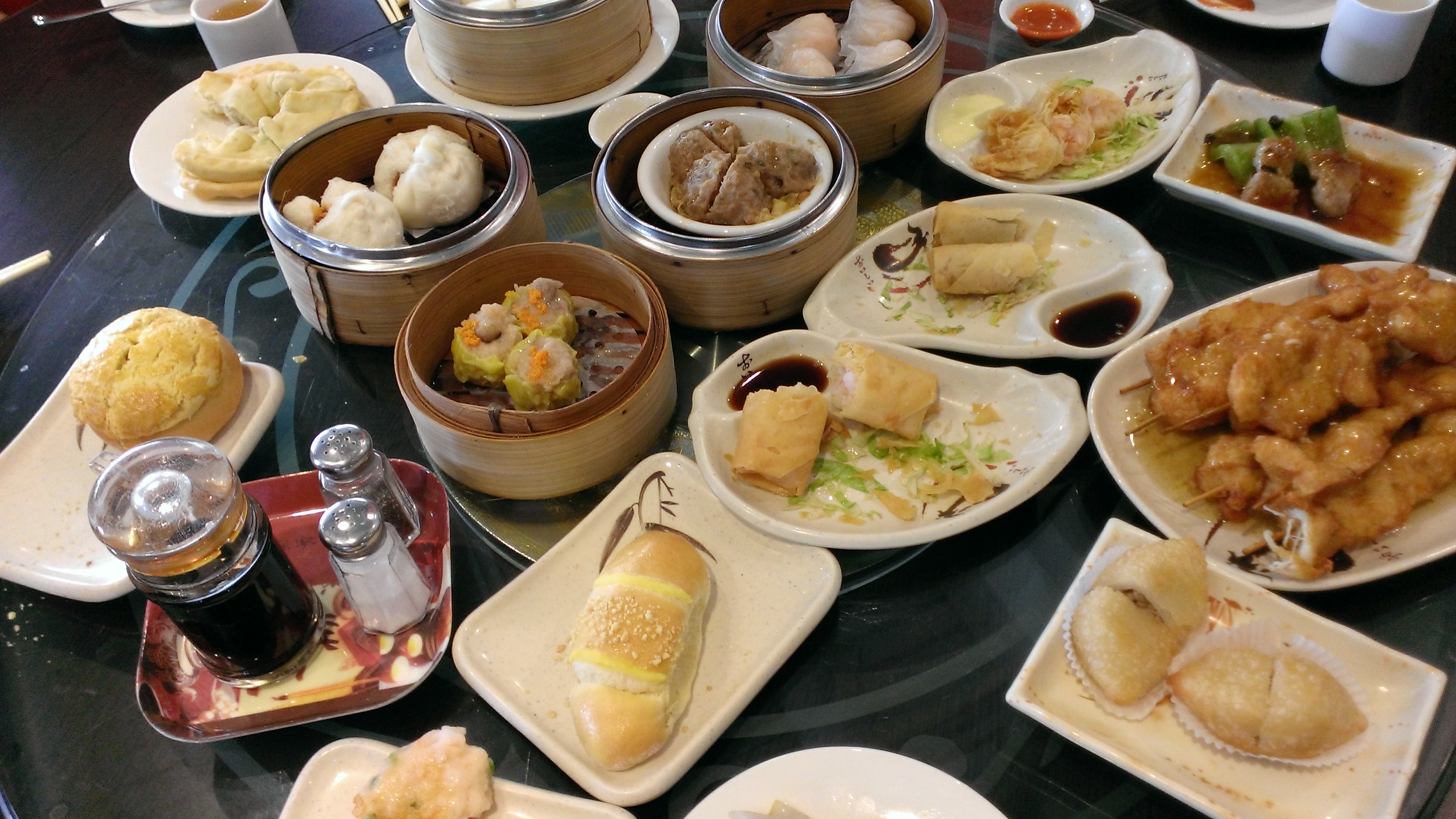
Dim sum served at a Chinese restaurant in Calgary, Alberta

Josephine Smart, a professor from the University of Calgary, has written on the evolution of Canadian Chinese cuisine. Her papers have examined the dynamics of localization and "authenticization" of Chinese food in Canada, and its implications for ethnic relations and the culture of consumption.

Chinese restaurants generally use either one of the romanization systems for Cantonese or an ad hoc romanization rather than the Pinyin romanization of Mandarin Chinese with which non-Chinese people are now most familiar.

Foam take-out containers are commonly used by Canadian Chinese restaurants for take-out, although some restaurants use special plastic containers. Aluminum pan pie dishes were previously used until the late 1990s, but fell out of favour due to high costs and environmental concerns.

Ginger beef
Deep fried strips of beef coated in a dark sweet sauce featuring ginger, garlic, and hot peppers, commonly served with a small amount of julienned carrots and onions. Ginger beef is derived from the original geung ngao yuk (Chinese: 薑牛肉) dish. Though common across the country, it is ubiquitous in Calgary and the Prairies. The invention of ginger beef is generally traced back to the Silver Inn in Calgary in the mid-1970s.
Newfoundland chow mein
A regional variant made with thinly sliced cabbage instead of egg noodles due to historical difficulties in accessing authentic Chinese ingredients in Atlantic Canada.
Montreal peanut-butter dumplings
A dish consisting of wonton or jiaozi covered with peanut, honey, and soy-sauce based sauce, most likely based-on the Sichuan dish hongyou chaoshou (紅油抄手, lit. "folded-dumplings in red-oil") and reinterpreted for the tastes of Montrealers. Also known as "Hunan dumplings", the dish was likely created in the 1980s at a restaurant Le Piment Rouge and quickly became popular throughout Chinese and Thai restaurants in Montreal and later Québec.
Thunder Bay bon bons
Thunder Bay bon bons is a salty, deep-fried rib dish that is said to go well with beer, invented in the 1940s by Thunder Bay Chinese restaurateur Lam Pang and now ubiquitous in Thunder Bay's Chinese restaurants. The ribs are chopped, marinated overnight in ingredients including salt, sugar, and five-spice powder, dipped in eggs, and coated with bread or crushed crackers before frying.
Fried macaroni
Fried macaroni consists of stir-fried macaroni with soy sauce, meat, and vegetables served in Quebec.
Green onion cake
A flat breaded cake that is made with scallions. It is a popular dish in Edmonton that was introduced by Siu To, a restaurateur who brought Northern Chinese delicacies to the city. Also known as cong you bing.
Sweet and sour chicken balls
Breaded chicken served in sweet and sour sauce. Possibly a Canadianized version of the traditional Cantonese sweet and sour pork.

For more expensive or formal occasions, Chinese Canadians may seek out more authentic Chinese cuisine. A Chinese wedding reception typically has nine or ten courses. Expensive luxury dishes such as abalone, lobster, jumbo shrimp, squab, sea bass, or sea cucumber are common on a wedding banquet menu. A whole cooked fish, chicken, or pig means luck and completeness in Chinese wedding culture.

== See also ==
- Canadian cuisine
- Chinese cuisine
- Fusion cuisine
- British Chinese cuisine
- Australian Chinese cuisine
- New Zealand Chinese cuisine
- Indian Chinese cuisine
- Korean Chinese cuisine
- Japanese Chinese cuisine
