= First Markham Place =

- 萬錦廣場
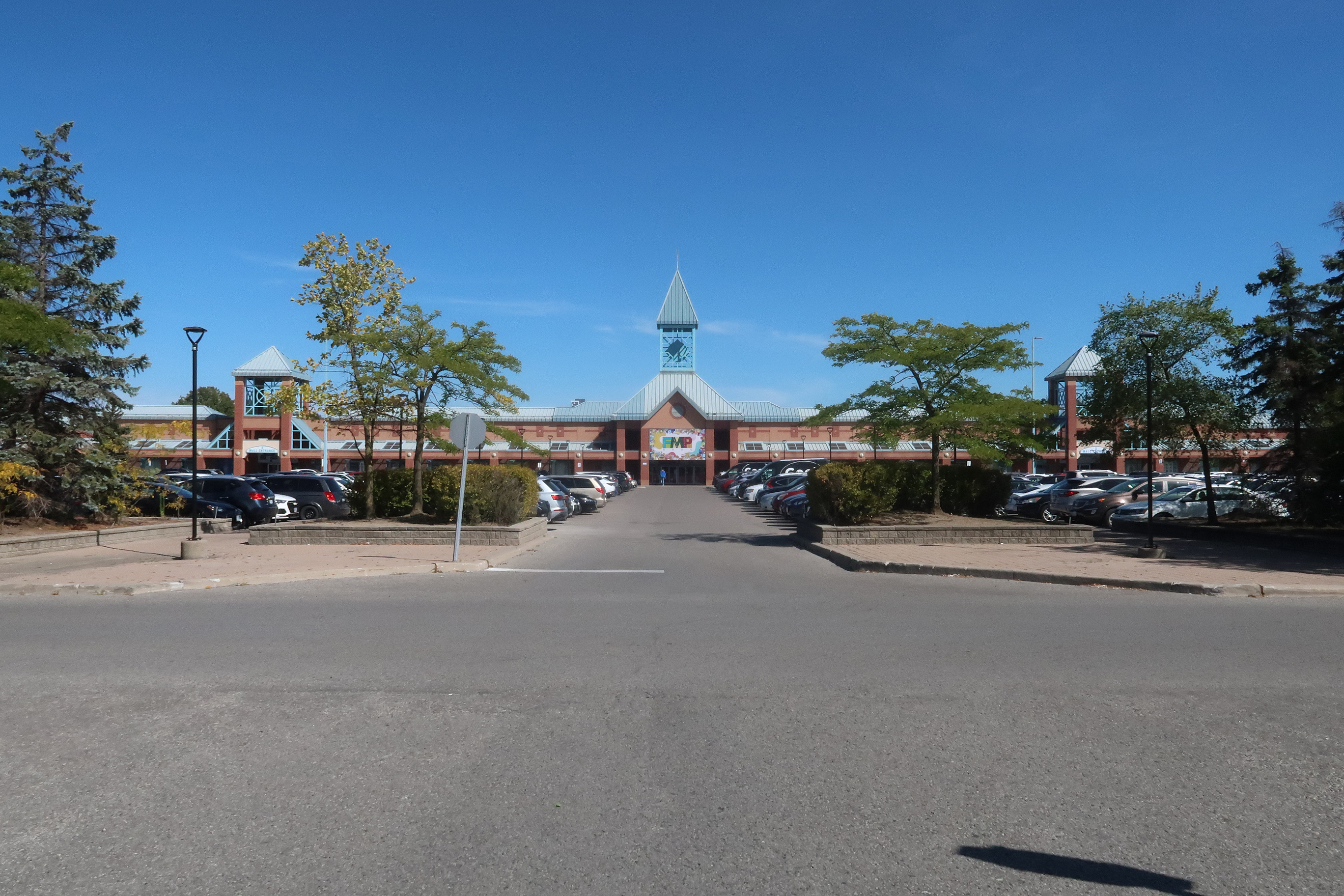
- Entrance into First Markham Place
- Location: Markham, Ontario, Canada
- Coordinates: 43.849159°N 79.349030°W
- Address: 3255 Highway 7
- Opened: 1998
- Num. of stores: 170+
- Num. of anchor tenants: 2
- Floors: 1
- Public transit: Route 1 Highway 7

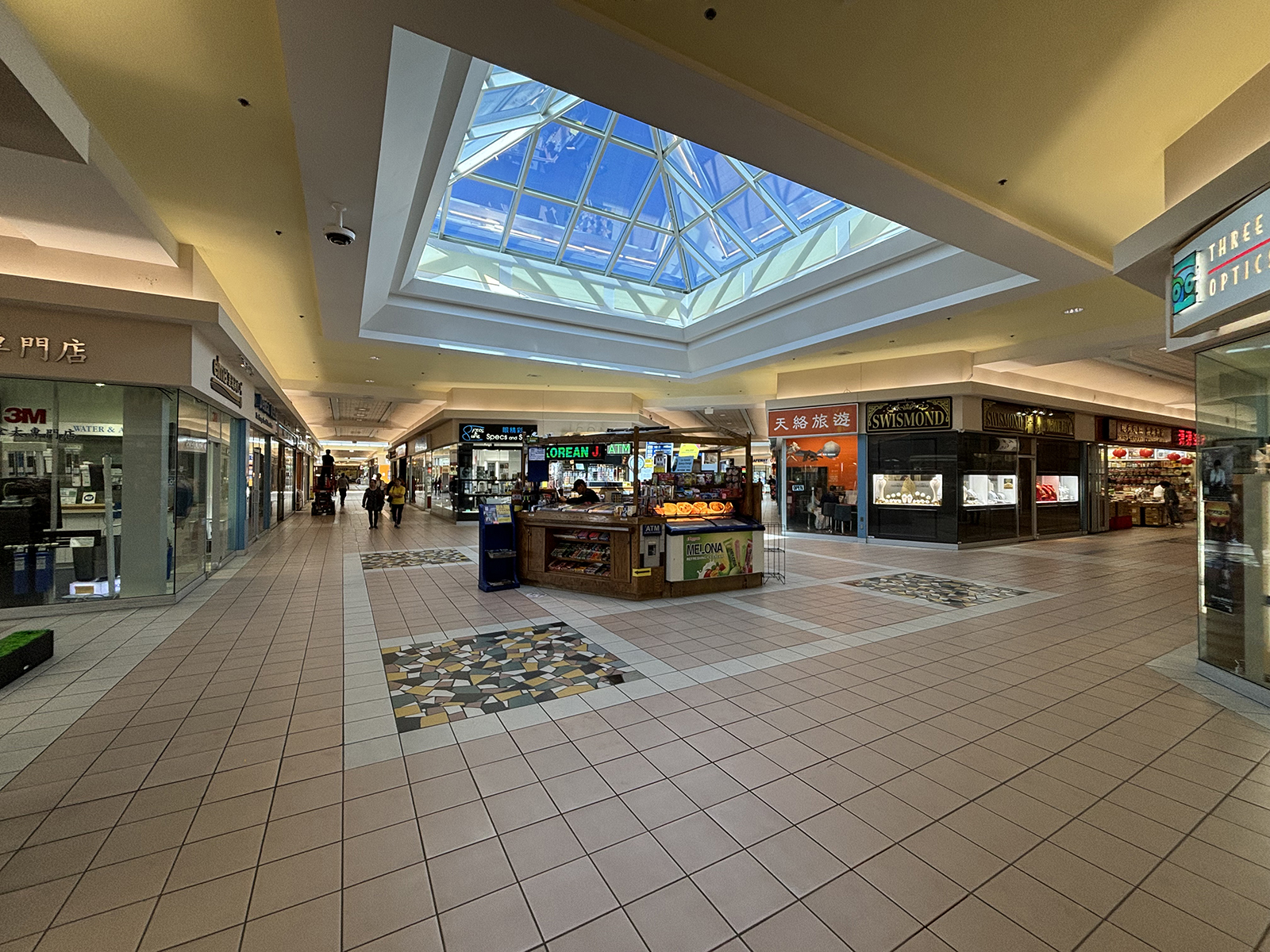
Mall interior

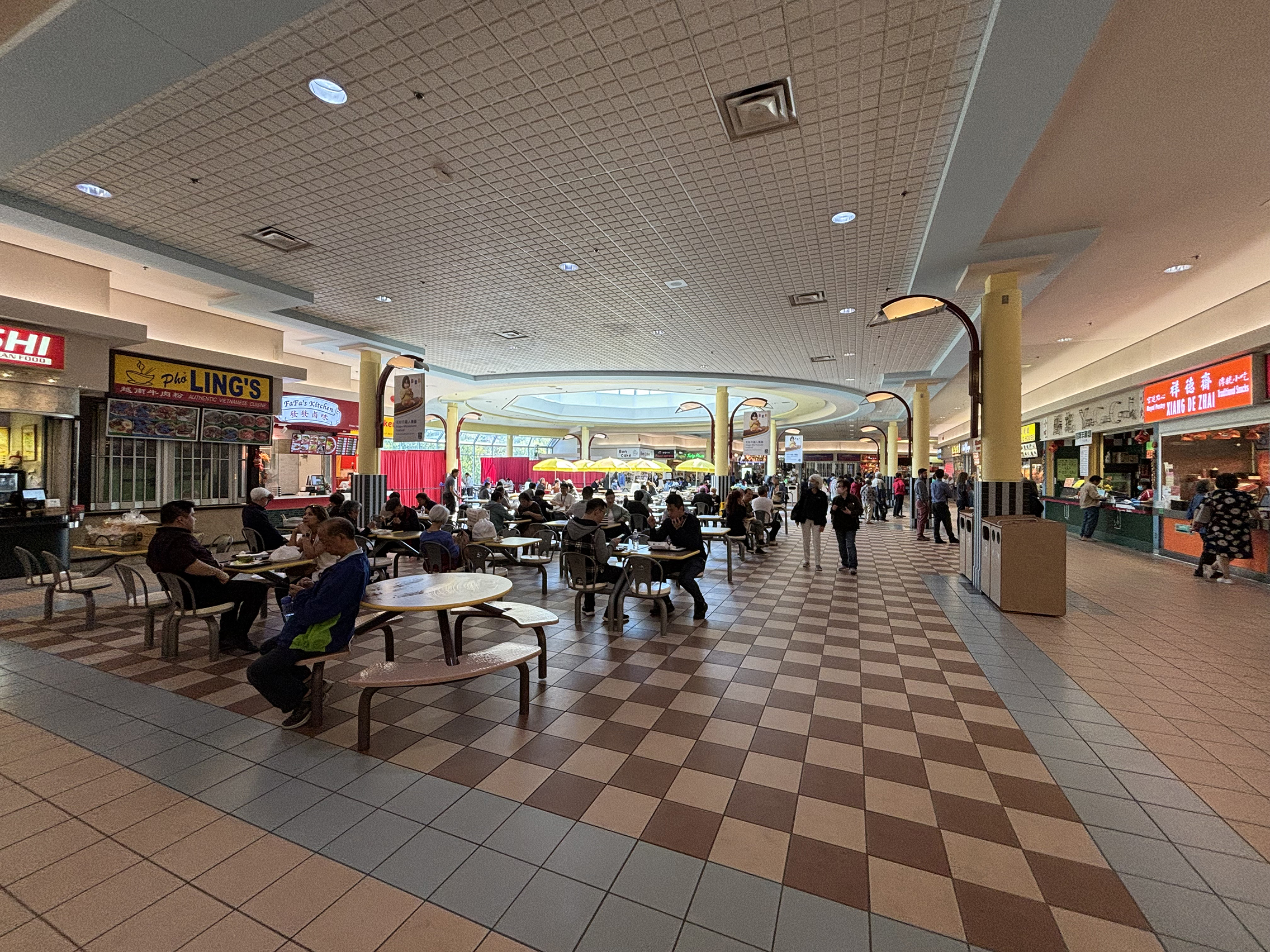
Food Court

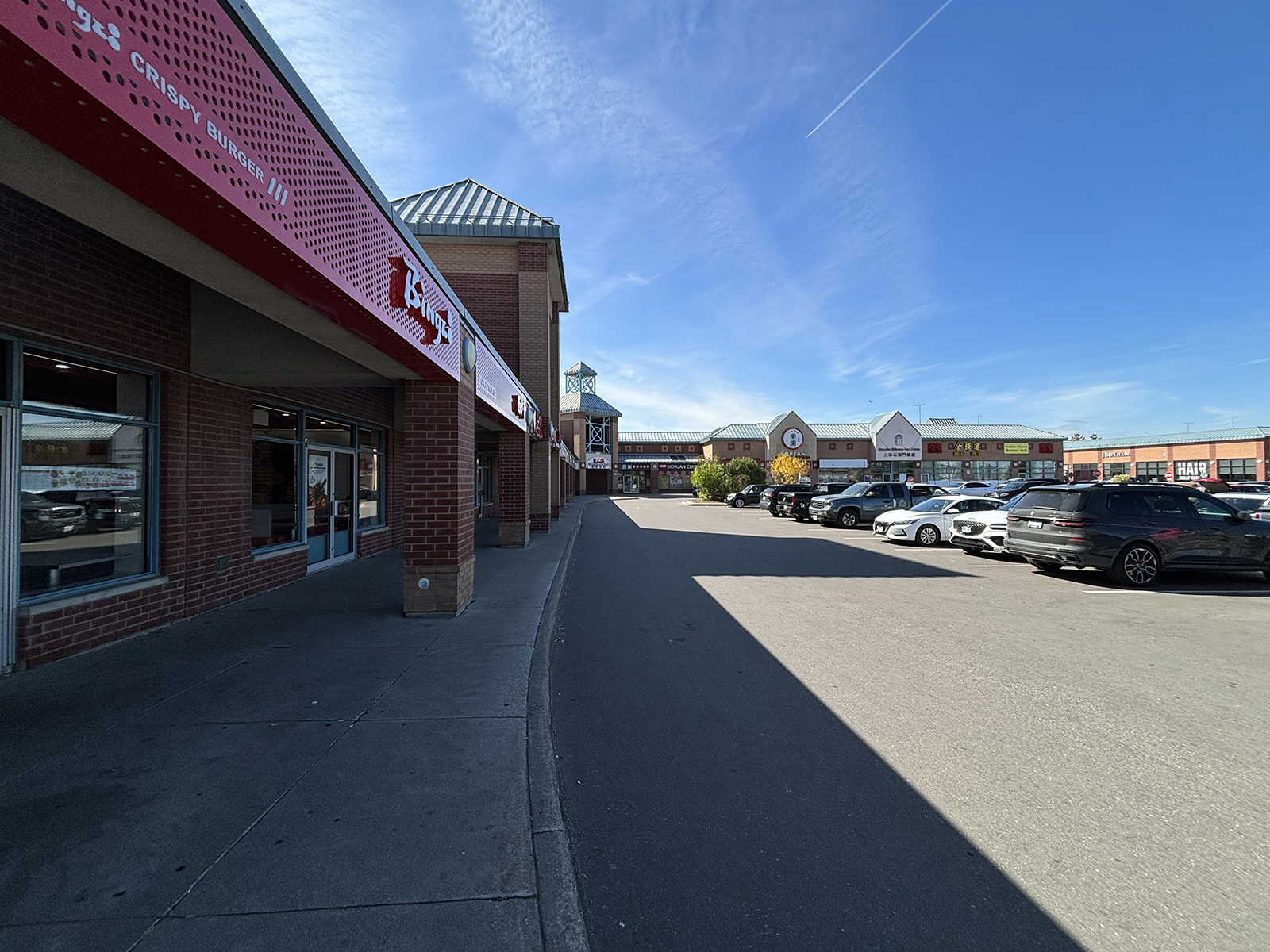
Outdoor shops

First Markham Place is an Asian shopping mall located in Markham, Ontario, Canada. It is located on the south side of Highway 7, east of Woodbine Avenue and west of Warden Avenue. The mall opened in 1998, one year after the opening of Pacific Mall, the largest Asian shopping mall in the Western world, which is also located in Markham. The mall's opening also coincided with a large influx of Chinese immigrants to Canada.

The mall currently has over 170 stores and services including the anchor tenants Oomomo, a Japanese home goods store, and FreshWay Foodmart, an Asian supermarket. There is a foodcourt with 24 vendors in the centre of the mall along with 23 sit-down restaurants outside that are attached to the mall.

== History ==
The mall once had a 68,000 square feet (6,300 m^{2}) Cineplex Odeon movie theatre until it moved in 2015 to the new Cineplex Cinemas and VIP in Downtown Markham. The space remained empty for nearly four years due to the difficulty of levelling the floors after the theatre left. There was a 9 feet (2.7 m) difference between the front and the rear area. The space is now occupied by Go Place, an Asian pool and spa complex. The complex contains seven pools and has a focus on water therapy.

The mall also had a 52,300 square feet (4,860 m^{2}) Home Outfitters, a defunct Canadian home decor chain. It closed in fall 2018. The space is now occupied by FreshWay Supermarket since fall 2020.

In 2020, due to the COVID-19 pandemic, the Government of Ontario implemented a state of emergency which ordered the mall to shut down. For a brief period, despite the mall being closed, customers were allowed into the mall to access the food court. However, tables and chairs were off limits to customers, therefore food had to be consumed elsewhere. Soon after, mall management prohibited customers from entering the mall to go to the food court while continuing to allow vendors to prepare food inside the mall. To serve customers, vendors had to move outside near the entrances. Due to the restrictions, vendors suffered greater difficulty running their businesses because of less customers, lack of protection from poor weather conditions, and difficulty with advertising without proper signage.

== Transportation access ==
First Markham Place is located on Highway 7 in Markham. Along the Highway 7 corridor, the mall is served by Viva Purple at Montgomery station on the Highway 7 Rapidway, along with York Region Transit Route 1 Highway 7. Street entrances are located along Highway 7 (eastbound traffic only), Fairburn Drive, and Rodick Road.

== See also ==
- Chinese Canadians in the Greater Toronto Area
- List of shopping malls in Canada
