= Jan-U-Wine =

Chinese canned food manufacturer from 1930s to 1980s

- Product type: Canned and prepackaged American Chinese food ingredients
- Country: United States

Jan-U-Wine was the first canned American Chinese food business in Los Angeles. The proprietor was Peter S. Hyun, a Korean born in 1903. Hyun's ambition was to become the “Henry Ford of Chinese foods”, with chop suey and chow mein as familiar menu items on American tables as is pork and beans.

== Early history ==
In the 1930s, Jan-U-Wine operated as the Oriental Food Products Company. Peter Hyun claimed Oriental Food Products company was the largest Oriental food caterer and distributor in the country, serving over 200,000 persons every month. In addition to providing catering services for banquets and social functions from 35 to 1,000 persons, it also supplied stores and hotels in Los Angeles.

A 1935 visitor to the company's food factory called it an "impressive operation." Describing crates of imported mushrooms, tables of fresh meats and chickens, and a machine that made noodle nests. Chicken turnover was made from tanks of creamy chicken gravy that became what customers see wrapped in cellophane on the grocer's shelf.

== Products ==
The Oriental Food Products Company provided delivery service of quart, half-gallon, gallon or any amount of chop suey to chow mein, with fortune cookies and crisp noodles to southwest residents in Los Angeles, as well as complete service at its 4100 South Broadway location. The company was open every weekday until midnight and 1:30am on Sundays and holidays.

By the 1930s, they started producing canned Chinese foods under the name Jan-U-Wine. The trademark for Jan-U-Wine was filed on June 27, 1935.

=== Bean sprouts ===
Peter S. Hyun introduced the first mung beans to California in 1936, importing them from China and using agricultural facilities of the Irvine Ranch to develop the American strain. It used a four-day process for growing bean sprouts in huge vats of water. There were only a few of them on the West coast, and they all operated under tight security as a top trade secret. By 1971, the plant turned out 100 tons of bean sprouts every four days. Jan-U-Wine Foods Corp. was the largest user of bean sprouts west of Chicago. La Choy operates the world's largest hydroponic garden for growing bean sprouts, and the process is a carefully guarded secret.

=== Canned goods ===
Jan-U-Wine eventually became one of the country's largest manufacturers of oriental-style foods. They completed a new million dollar plant in the City of Commerce in the 1950s. By then, their offering expanded to include fancy bean sprouts, Chinese soup, chicken chop suey gravy, brown gravy sauce, water chestnuts, bamboo shoots, soy sauce, chow mein noodles, chinaroni, cooked rice, fancy chop suey vegetables, chicken fried rice, fortune cakes, chicken sub kum, chicken chow mein, beef chop suey, mushroom chow mein, and the Triple-pac Mandarin Banquets that included mixed vegetables in the bottom can, chicken gravy in the middle can and crispy noodles in the top can.

=== Recipe books ===
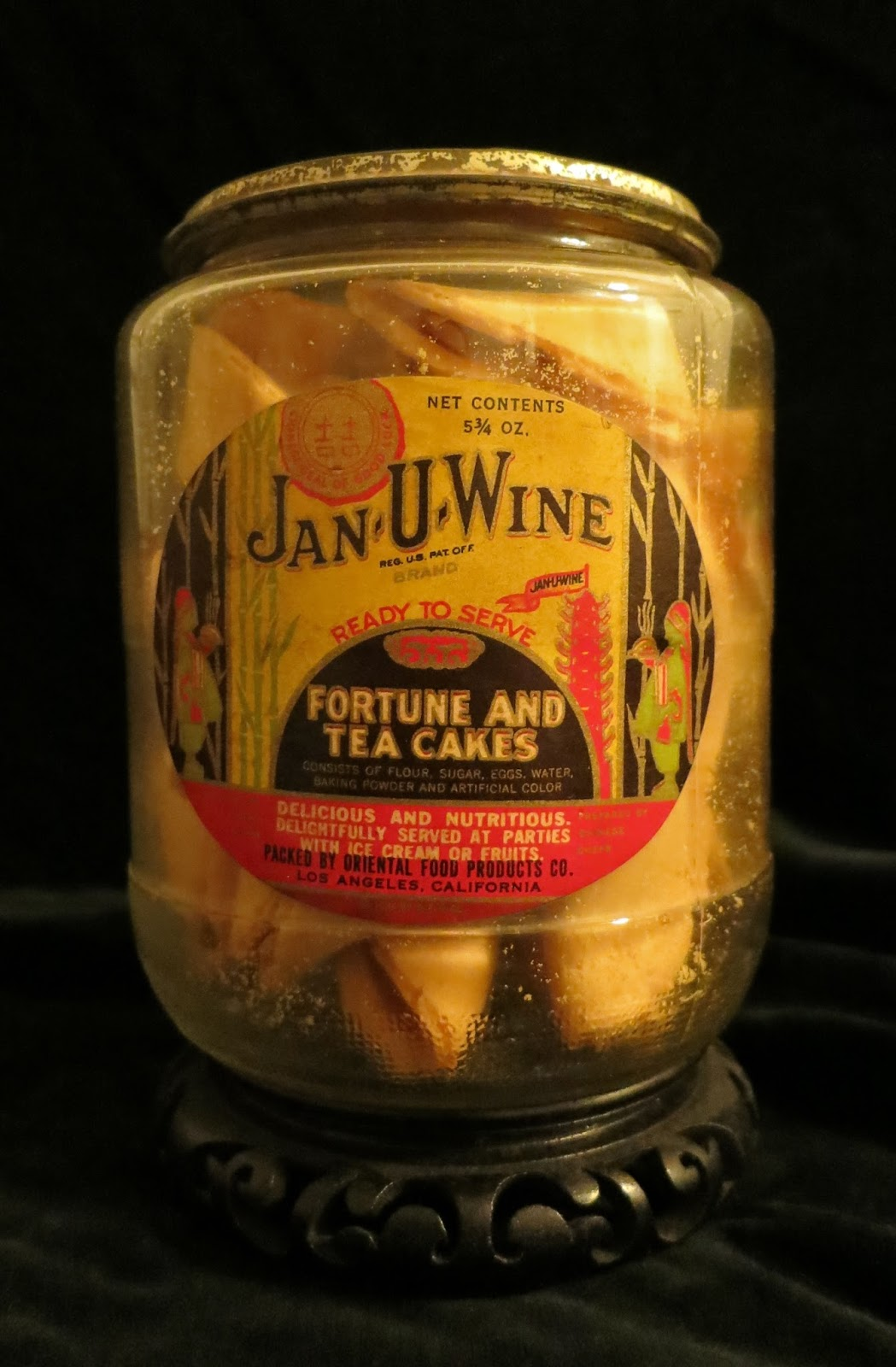
Jan-U-Wine Fortune and Tea Cakes

In 1960, Jan-U-Wine began distributing complimentary recipe books. This booklet featured 24 pages of Chinese-American recipes ranging from appetizers, salads, main dishes, vegetables, to desserts. The recipe book proudly proclaimed that Jan-U-Wine offered the most comprehensive line of Chinese foods in the world, all of which were included in the booklet.

=== Franchise ===
Jan-U-Wine launched a national franchising program for take-home Chinese food in 1969. The franchise stores were responsible for packaging the food prepared by the company for take-home, and the first store opened in Anaheim's Village Shopping Center. Jan-U-Wine also created a cartoon symbol for the franchised units, featuring a character named “Jan-U-Wine Charlie,” played by actor Victor Sen Yung, who had appeared in the Charlie Chan films and played a chef on the western series Bonanza.

By the 1950s, canned Chinese food was one of the most popular “international foods” sold in grocery stores. While Jan-U-Wine enjoyed success on the West Coast, Chun King emerged as a major competitor nationally. By the late 1950s and early 1960s, Chun King had become the leading brand of canned Chinese food, controlling 80% of the market. According to the then assistant manager of the Grocery Division of La Choy, Gordon E. Swaney, Jan-U-Wine and Chun King initially had easy pickings on the West Coast, so La Choy quickly expanded with the goal of expanding principally in the East.

Jaisohn Hyan, the youngest son, took over as president from his father Peter S. Hyun when he died in 1971. Jaisohn Huan died in 1983. A public auction notice in 1985 for canned food processing facility equipment formerly of Jan-U-Wine Foods, Inc. indicates the company went under around the time shortly after Hyan's death.

== See also ==
- Chun King
- La Choy
