= La Choy =

American brand of Asian food products

- Product type: Canned and prepackaged American Chinese food ingredients
- Current owner: ConAgra Foods
- Introduced: 1922; 104 years ago
- Website: www.lachoy.com

La Choy (stylized La Choy 東) is a brand name of canned and prepackaged American Chinese food ingredients. The brand was purchased in 1990 from Beatrice Foods by ConAgra Foods during LBO firm Kohlberg Kravis Roberts' dismantling of the company and is still currently a property of ConAgra.

== Early history ==
Advertisement for La Choy in The Boston Traveler on March 02, 1928

The company was founded in 1922 by Dr. Ilhan New, later founder of Yuhan Corporation in South Korea, and Wallace J. "Wally" Smith from the University of Michigan. The first product, canned mung bean sprouts, was originally sold in Smith's Detroit, Michigan, grocery store.

New left the company for personal reasons in 1930, and Smith was killed by lightning in 1937. Nevertheless, the company flourished. By the late 1930s, management at the firm had developed a comprehensive line of food products, including bean sprouts, soy sauce, subgum, kumquats, water chestnuts, brown sauce, bamboo shoots, and chow mein noodles.

The company capitalized on the growing fascination Americans had with East Asia, including an entirely different type of cuisine. In 1937, the company built its first manufacturing facility in Detroit, featuring 60,000 square feet (5,600 m^{2}) of production space.

To reduce overhead costs and maintain profitability during World War II, management decided to relocate the company from its facility in Detroit about 90 mi (140 km) to Archbold, Ohio, in 1942. Selling its Detroit plant to the federal government for the production of munitions, the proceeds from the sale enabled the company to start a new era in its history. In 1943, the Beatrice Creamery Co. purchased La Choy Food Products.

On June 23, 1957, three principals of the La Choy company, all from Archbold, appeared as contestants on the TV panel show What's My Line. As all three men had Irish surnames (Muldoon, McCarthy, and McDonough), they managed to stump the panel.

== Marketing and advertising ==
A popular advertising jingle from the 1970s included the slogan "LaChoy makes Chinese food swing American."

=== Muppets ===
Early in his career, Jim Henson created a series of television commercials from 1965 to 1967 featuring a Full-Bodied Muppet character called Delbert the La Choy Dragon (performed by Frank Oz and voiced by Jim Henson) which used the catchphrase "quick cooked in dragon fire" to describe the product.

Delbert was accompanied in later commercials by a timid character named Mert (performed by Jim Henson). Delbert was one of Oz's few full-bodied Muppet performances, since he did not like performing in their costumes.

== See also ==
- Mein gon (crunchy chow mein noodles)
- Chop suey
- Chow mein sandwich
