= Donburi =

Japanese meals based on a rice bowl

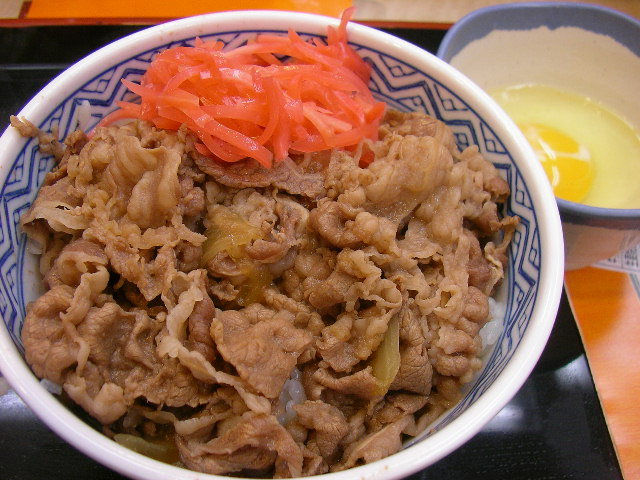
- The typical appearance of gyudon provided by Japanese chain restaurants
- Alternative names: Bowl food
- Course: Main course
- Place of origin: Japan
- Serving temperature: hot food

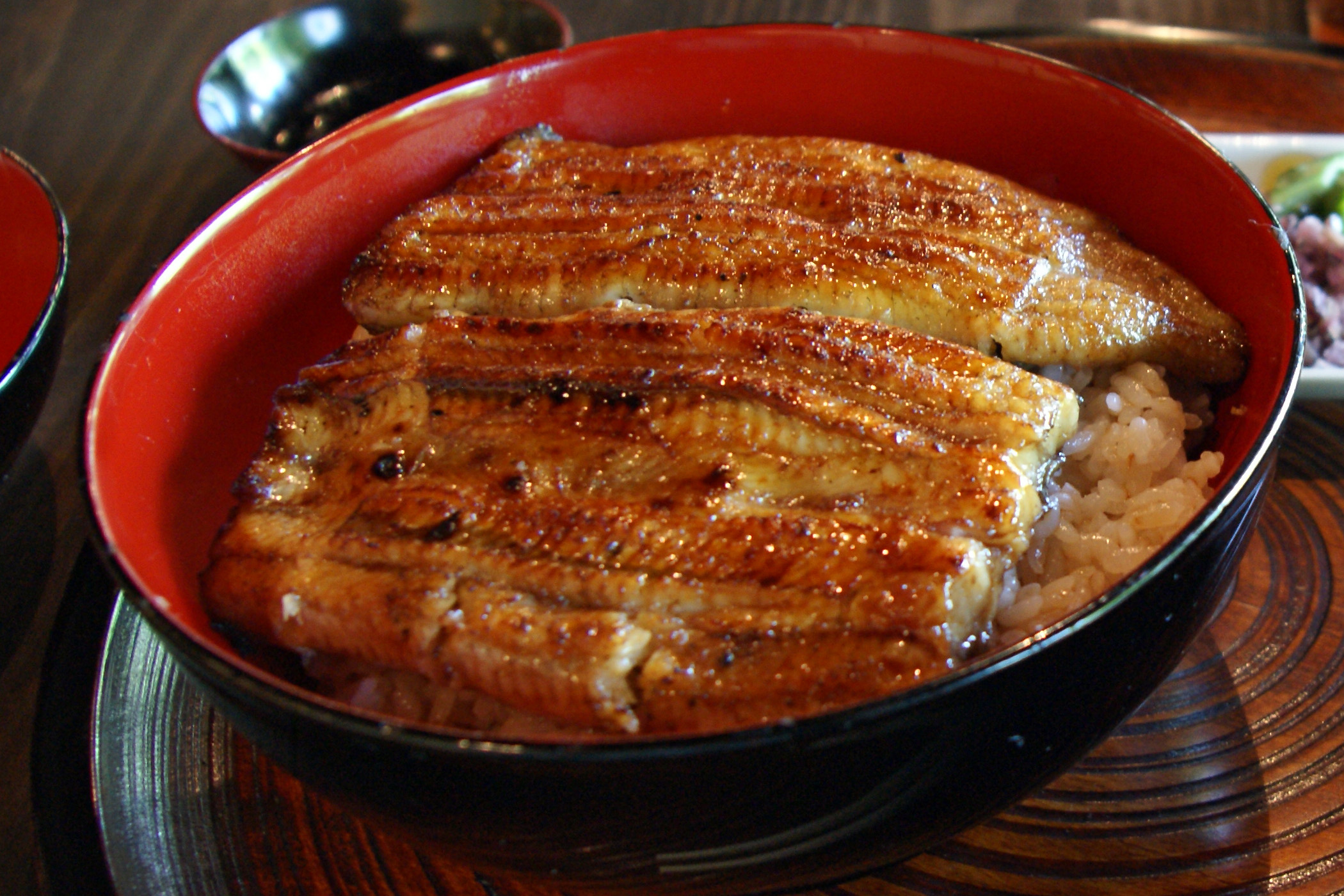
Unadon, one common donburi dish

Donburi (Note: Japanese: 丼; lit. 'bowl', sometimes spelled as domburi and abbreviated to "-don" as a suffix) (IPA: [dombɯɾi]) is a Japanese "rice-bowl dish" consisting of fish, meat, vegetables or other ingredients simmered together and served over rice. Donburi meals are usually served in oversized rice bowls which are also called donburi. If one needs to distinguish, the bowl is called donburi-bachi (丼鉢) and the food is called donburi-mono (丼物).

The simmering sauce varies according to season, ingredients, region, and taste. A typical sauce might consist of dashi (stock broth) flavored with soy sauce and mirin (rice wine). Proportions vary, but there is normally three to four times as much dashi as soy sauce and mirin. For oyakodon, Tsuji (1980) recommends dashi flavored with light soy sauce, dark soy sauce, and sugar. For gyūdon, Tsuji recommends water flavored with dark soy sauce and mirin.

Donburi can be made from almost any ingredients, including leftovers.

== Varieties ==
Traditional Japanese donburi include the following:

=== Gyūdon ===
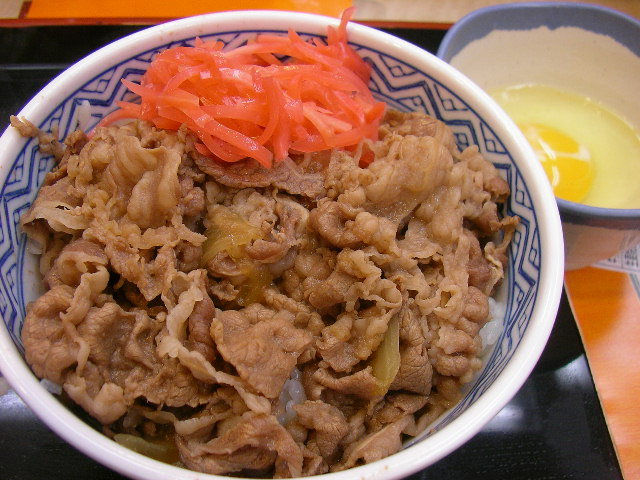
Gyūdon beef bowl

Gyūdon (牛丼; literally 'beef bowl'), is a Japanese dish consisting of a bowl of rice topped with beef and onion simmered in a mildly sweet sauce flavored with dashi (fish and seaweed stock), soy sauce and mirin (sweet rice wine). It also often includes shirataki noodles, and is sometimes topped with a raw egg or a soft poached egg (onsen tamago).

=== Butadon ===
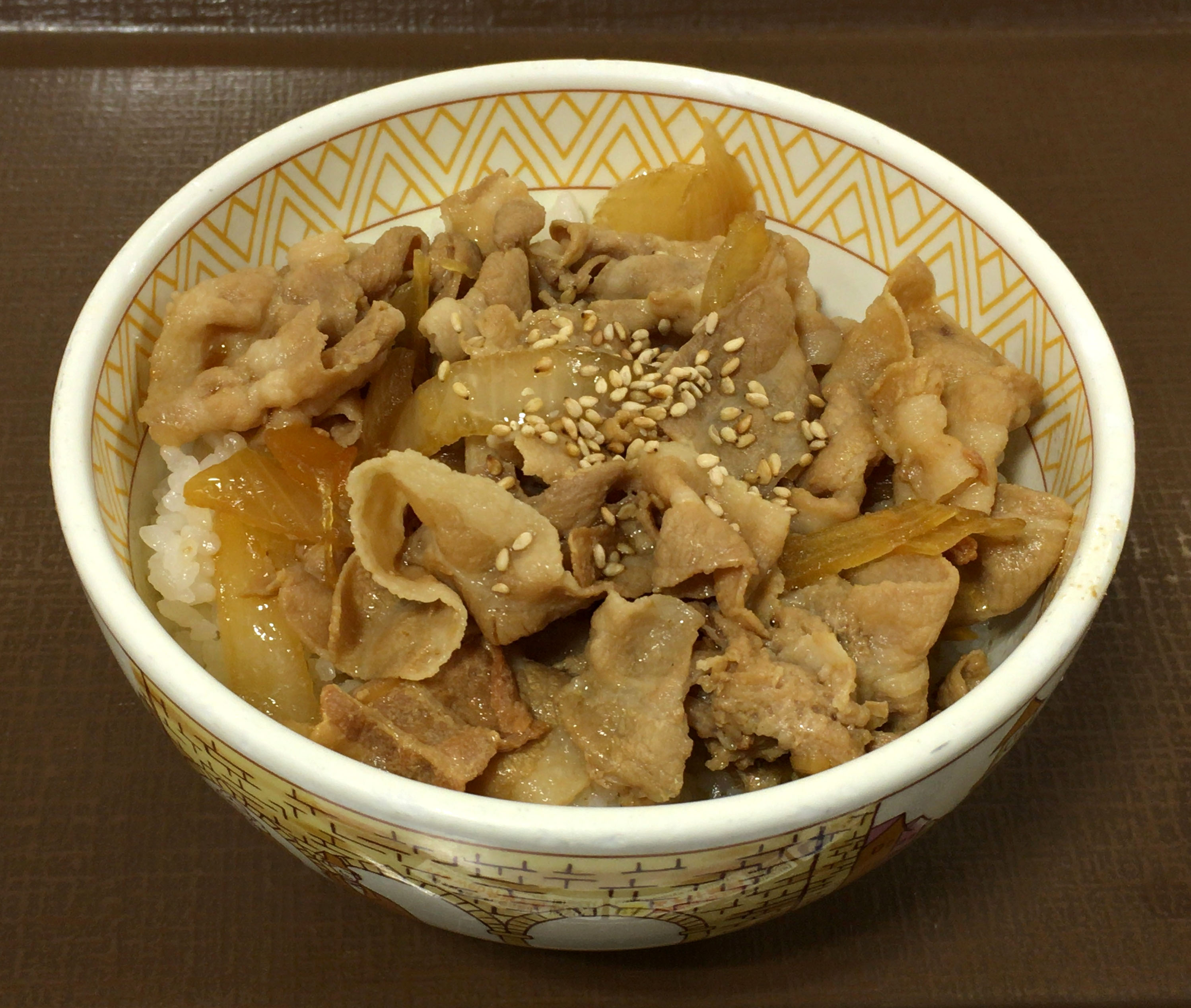
Butadon

Buta means pork. "Butadon" (豚丼) is a dish made with pork instead of beef in a mildly sweet sauce. Butadon originated in Hokkaido but is now enjoyed all over Japan.

=== Tendon ===
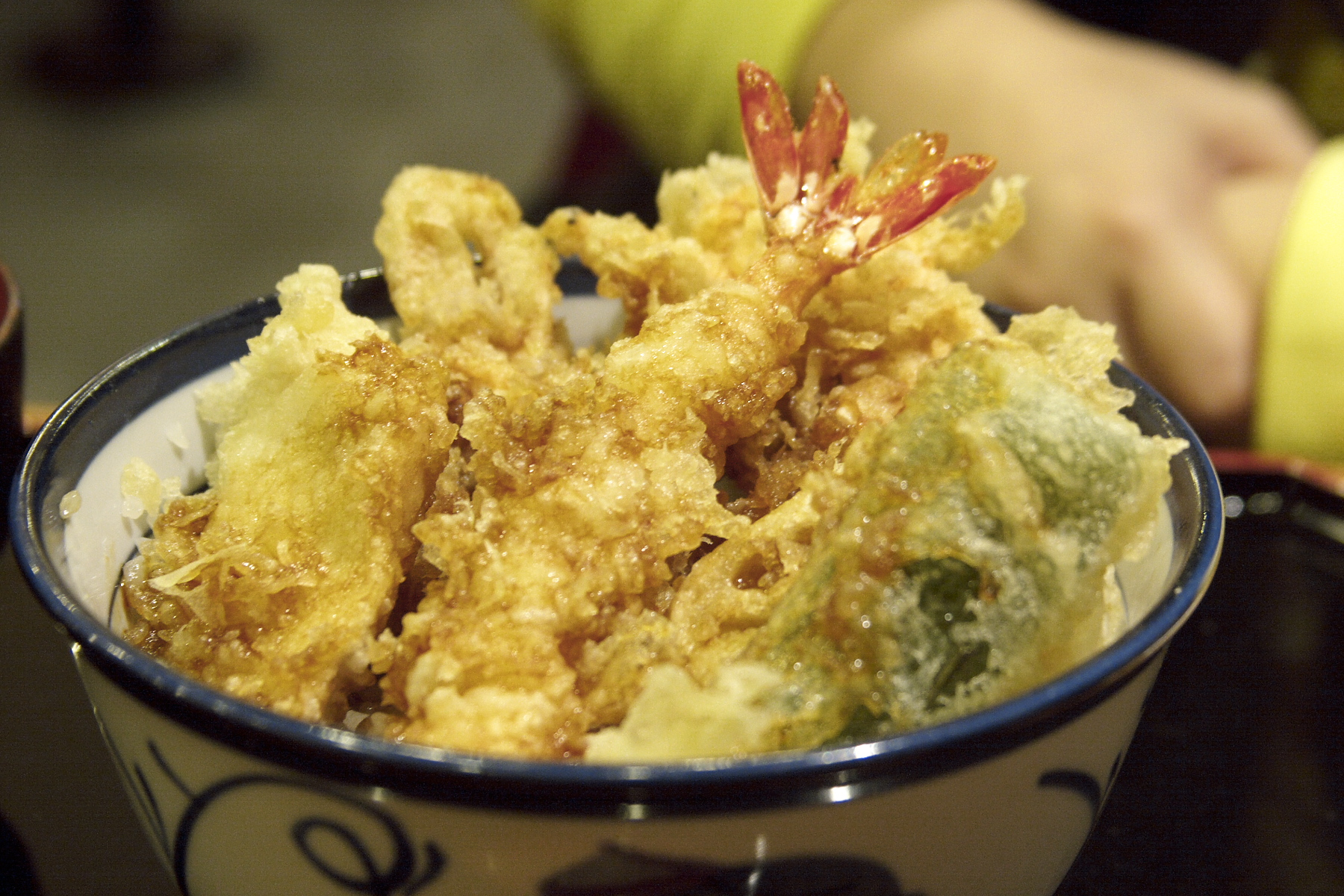
Tendon

Tendon (天丼) consists of tempura on a bowl of rice. The name "tendon" is an abbreviation of tempura (天ぷら or 天麩羅) and donburi (丼).

=== Tentamadon ===
Tentamadon (天玉丼) consists of tempura which is simmered with beaten egg and topped on rice.

=== Unadon ===
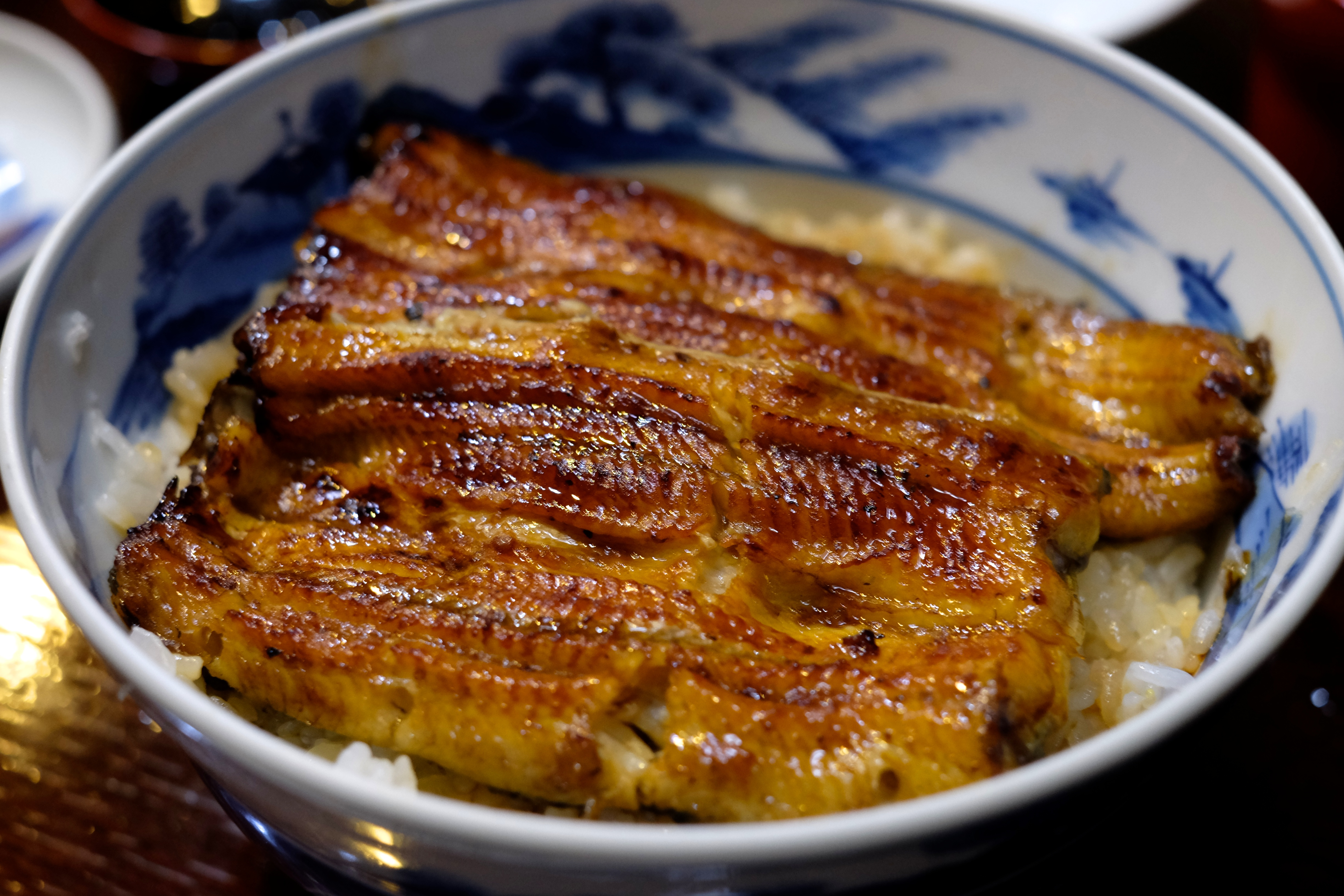
Unadon

Unadon (鰻丼; an abbreviation for unagi + donburi, "eel bowl") is a dish originating in Japan. It consists of a donburi type large bowl filled with steamed white rice, and topped with fillets of eel (unagi) grilled in a style known as kabayaki, similar to teriyaki. The fillets are glazed with a sweetened soy-based sauce, called tare and caramelized, preferably over charcoal fire. The fillets are not flayed, and the grayish skin side is placed face-down. Una-don was the first type of donburi rice dish, invented in the late Edo period, during the Bunka era (1804–1818)

=== Oyakodon ===
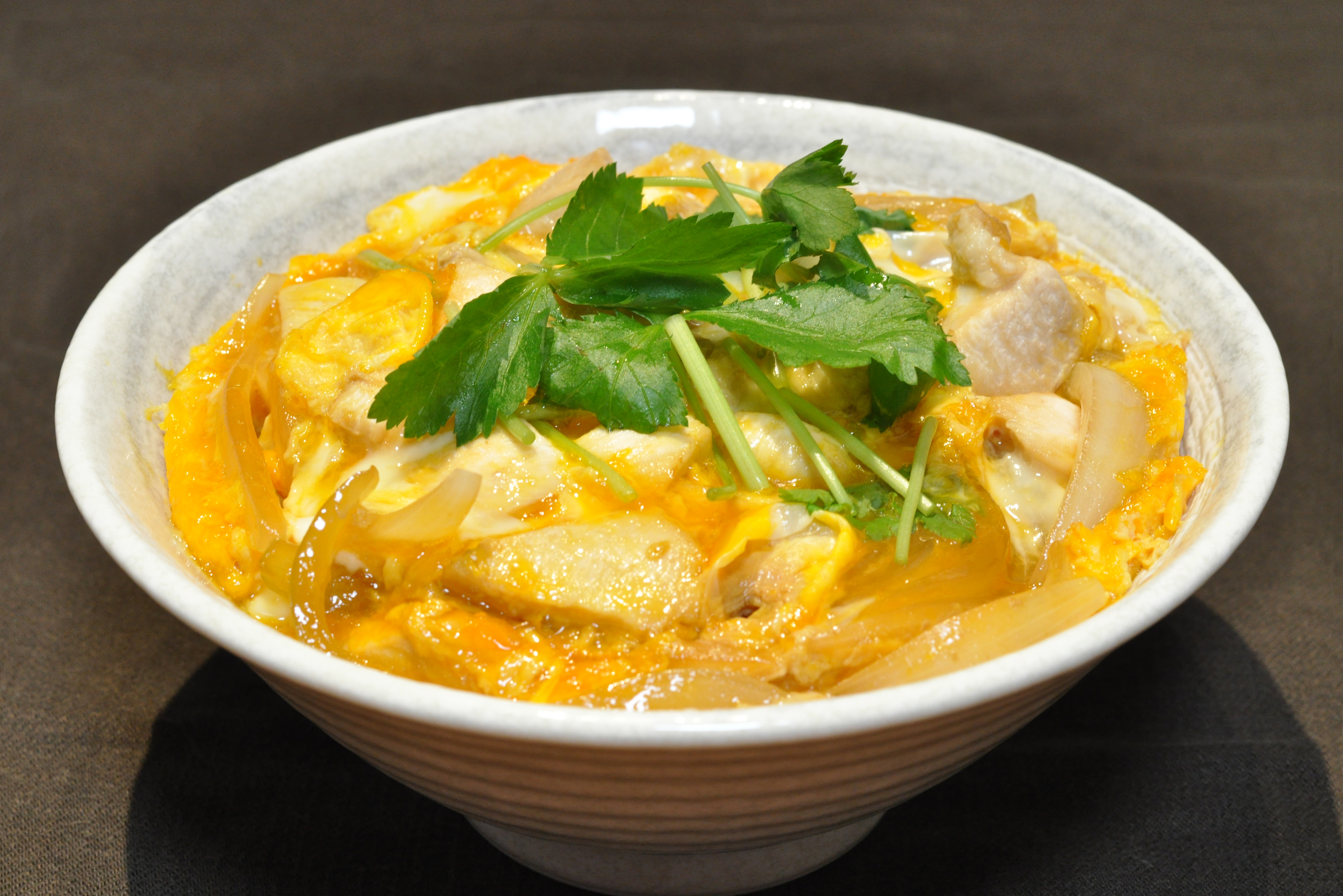
Oyakodon

Oyakodon (親子丼) consists of simmered chicken, egg, and sliced scallion served on top of a large bowl of rice. The chicken is also sometimes replaced with beef or pork in a variation referred to as tanindon (他人丼).

=== Katsudon ===
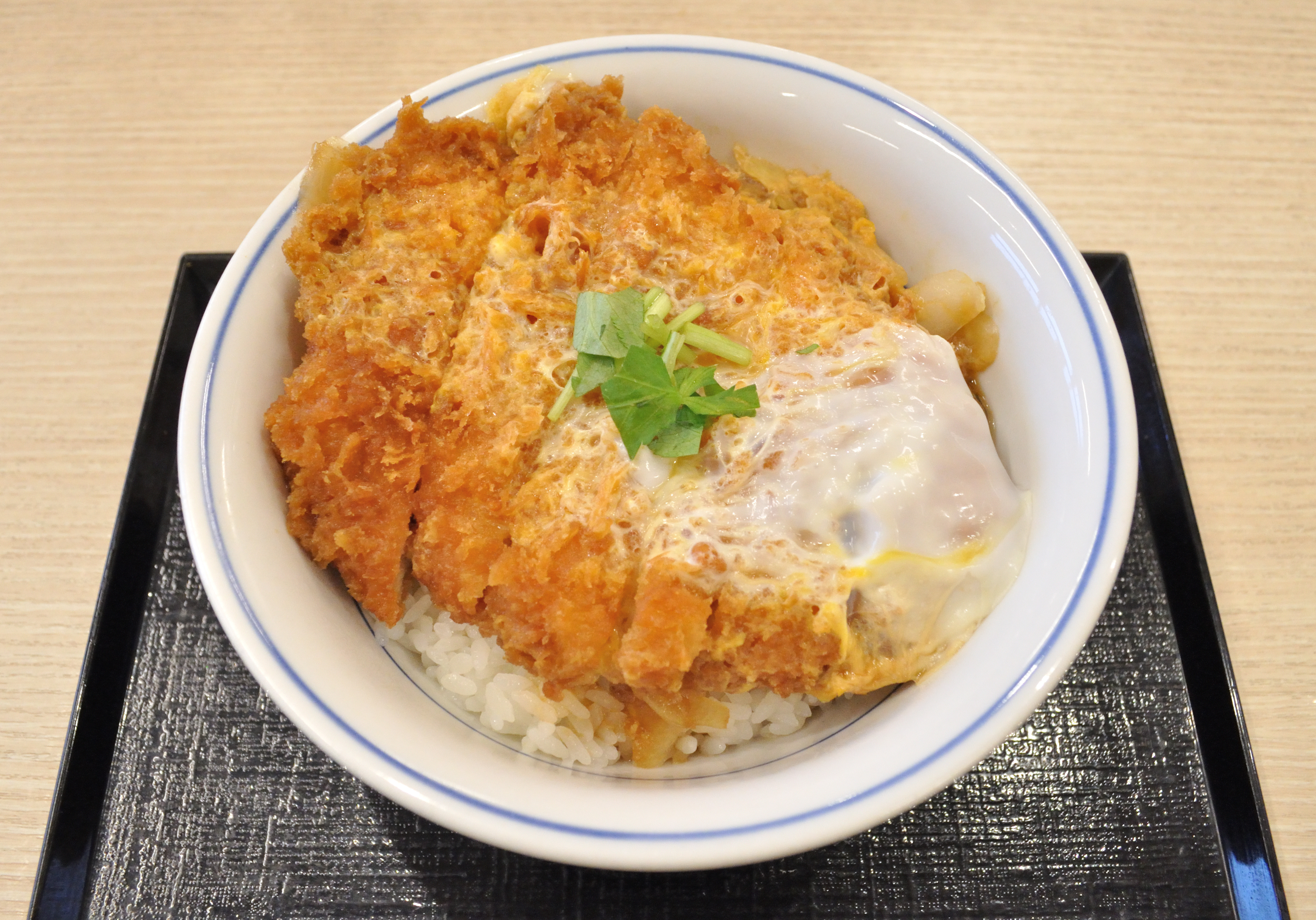
Katsudon

Katsudon (カツ丼) consists of breaded deep-fried pork cutlets (tonkatsu) and onion are simmered and binding by beaten egg, then topped on rice. There are some regional variations in Japan.

=== Tamagodon ===
Tamagodon (玉子丼) consists of a scrambled egg mixed with sweet donburi sauce on rice.

=== Kitsunedon ===
Kitsunedon (きつね丼) consists of abura-age, egg, and sliced scallion with sweet donburi sauce on rice. Kitsunedon is also called Kinugasadon in Kyoto.

=== Sōsukatsudon ===
Sōsukatsudon (ソースカツ丼) is similar to katsudon, but with sliced cabbage and sweet-salty sauce instead of egg.

=== Konohadon ===
Konohadon (木の葉丼) is similar to oyakodon, but using thin sliced kamaboko pieces instead of chicken meat. Popular in Kansai area.

=== Karēdon ===
Karēdon (カレー丼) consists of thickened curry-flavored dashi on rice. It was derived from curry udon or curry nanban (a soba dish). Sold at soba/udon restaurants.

=== Tekkadon ===
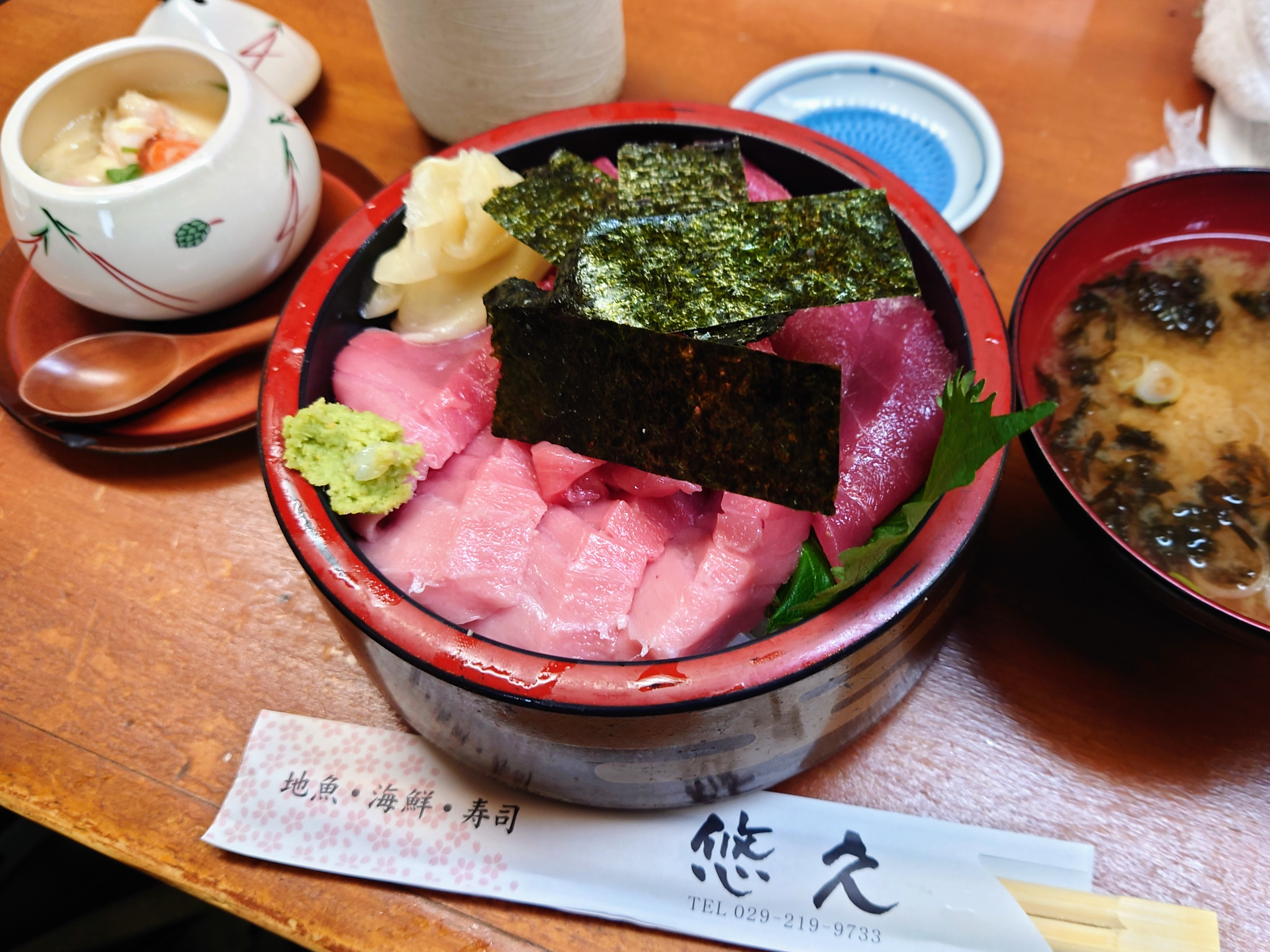
Tuna bowl served at a restaurant in Oarai, Japan

Tekkadon (鉄火丼) consists of thinly sliced raw tuna on rice. Spicy tekkadon is made with what can be a mix of spicy ingredients, a spicy orange sauce, or both (usually incorporating spring onions).

=== Hokkaidon ===
Hokkaidon (北海丼) consists of thinly sliced raw salmon over rice.

=== Negitorodon ===
Negitorodon (ネギトロ丼) consists of negitoro, a combination of diced toro (fatty tuna) and negi (spring onions), on rice.

=== Ikuradon ===
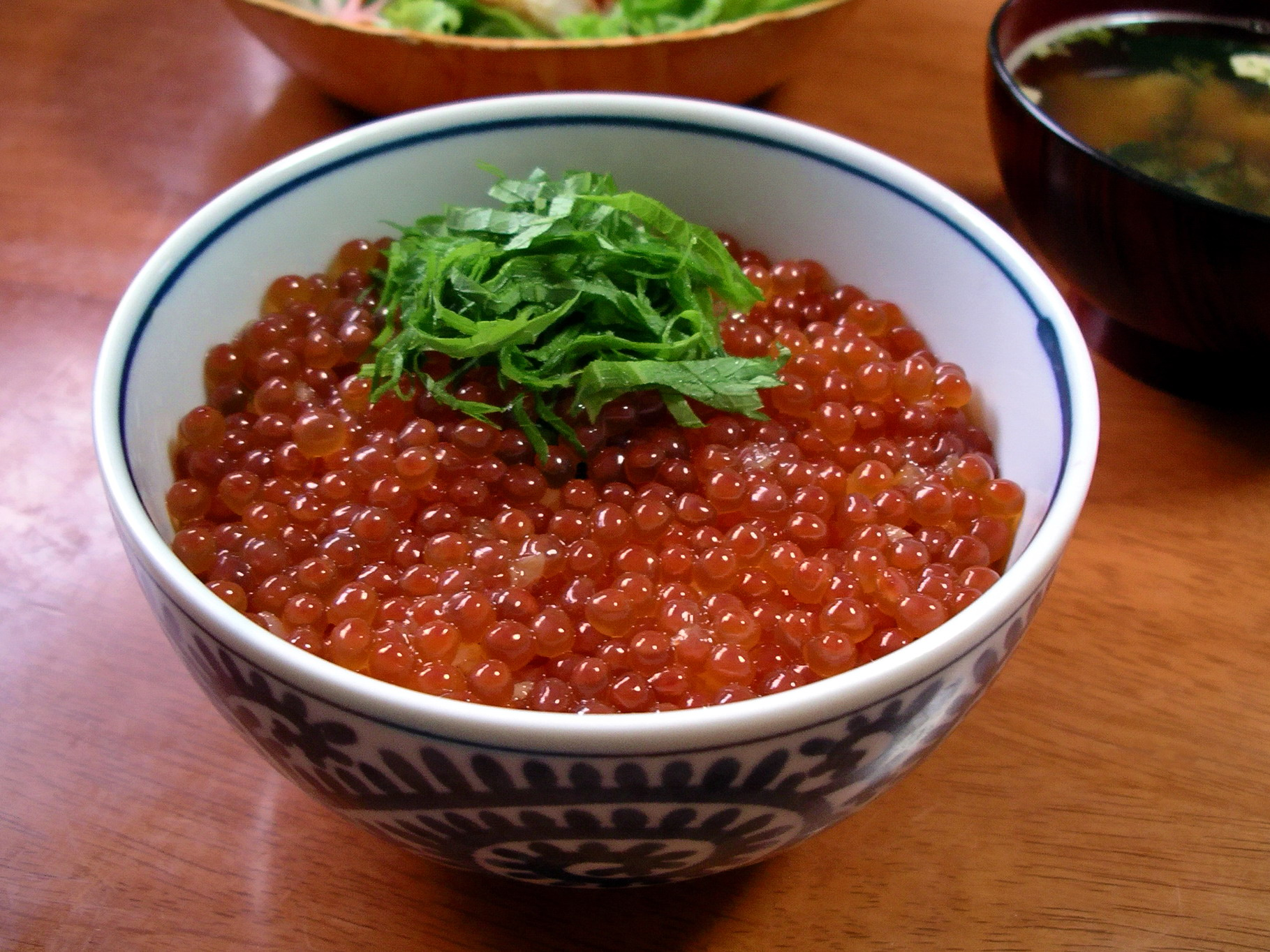
Ikura don

Ikuradon (いくら丼) is seasoned ikura (salmon roe) on rice.

=== Kaisendon ===
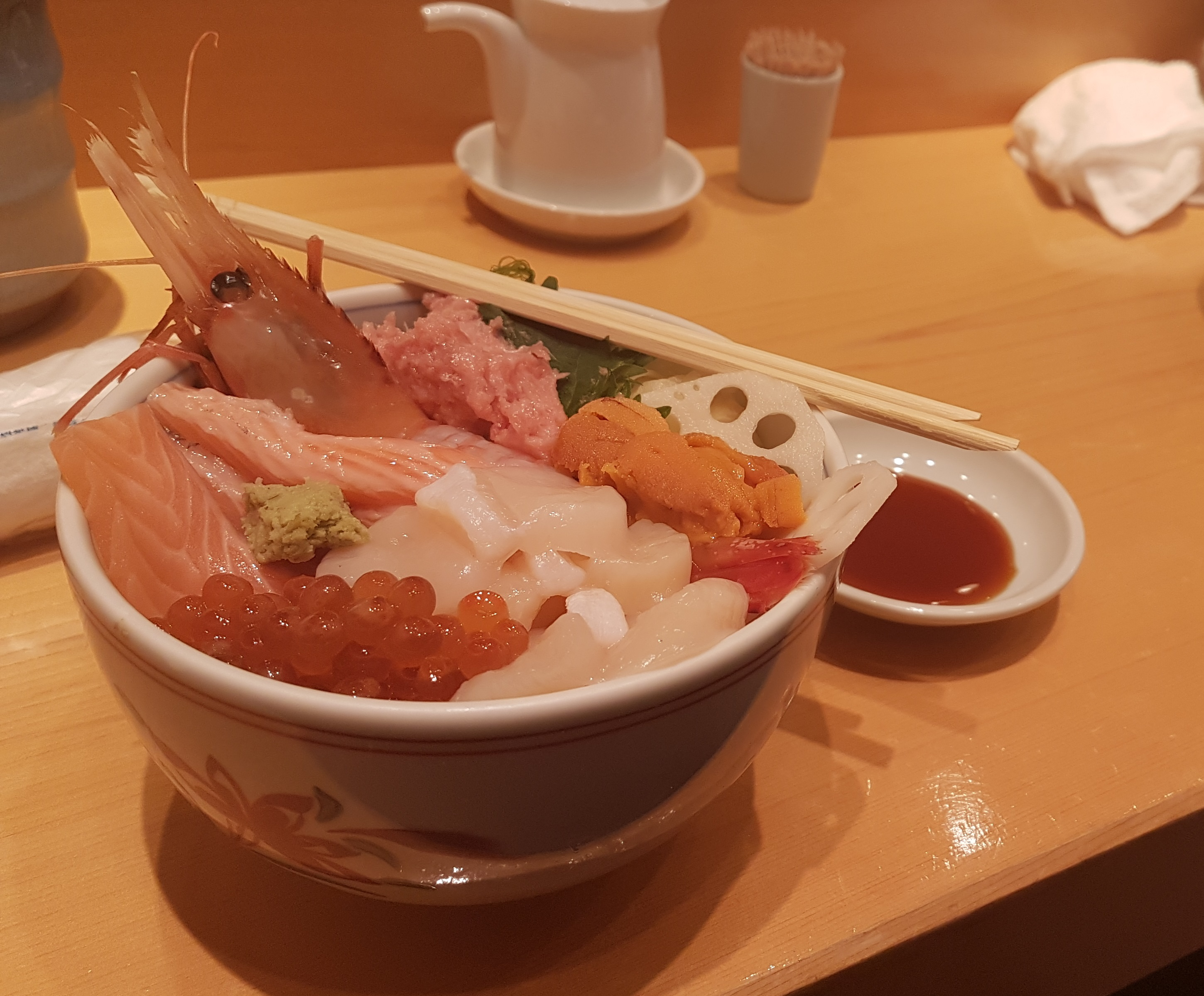
An elaborate kaisendon at Tsukiji fish market

Kaisendon (海鮮丼) consists of thinly sliced sashimi on rice. Fish roe may also be included.

=== Tenshindon or tenshin-han ===
Tenshindon or tenshin-han (天津丼 / 天津飯) is a Chinese-Japanese specialty, consisting of a crabmeat omelet on rice; this dish is named for the city of Tianjin.

=== Chūkadon ===
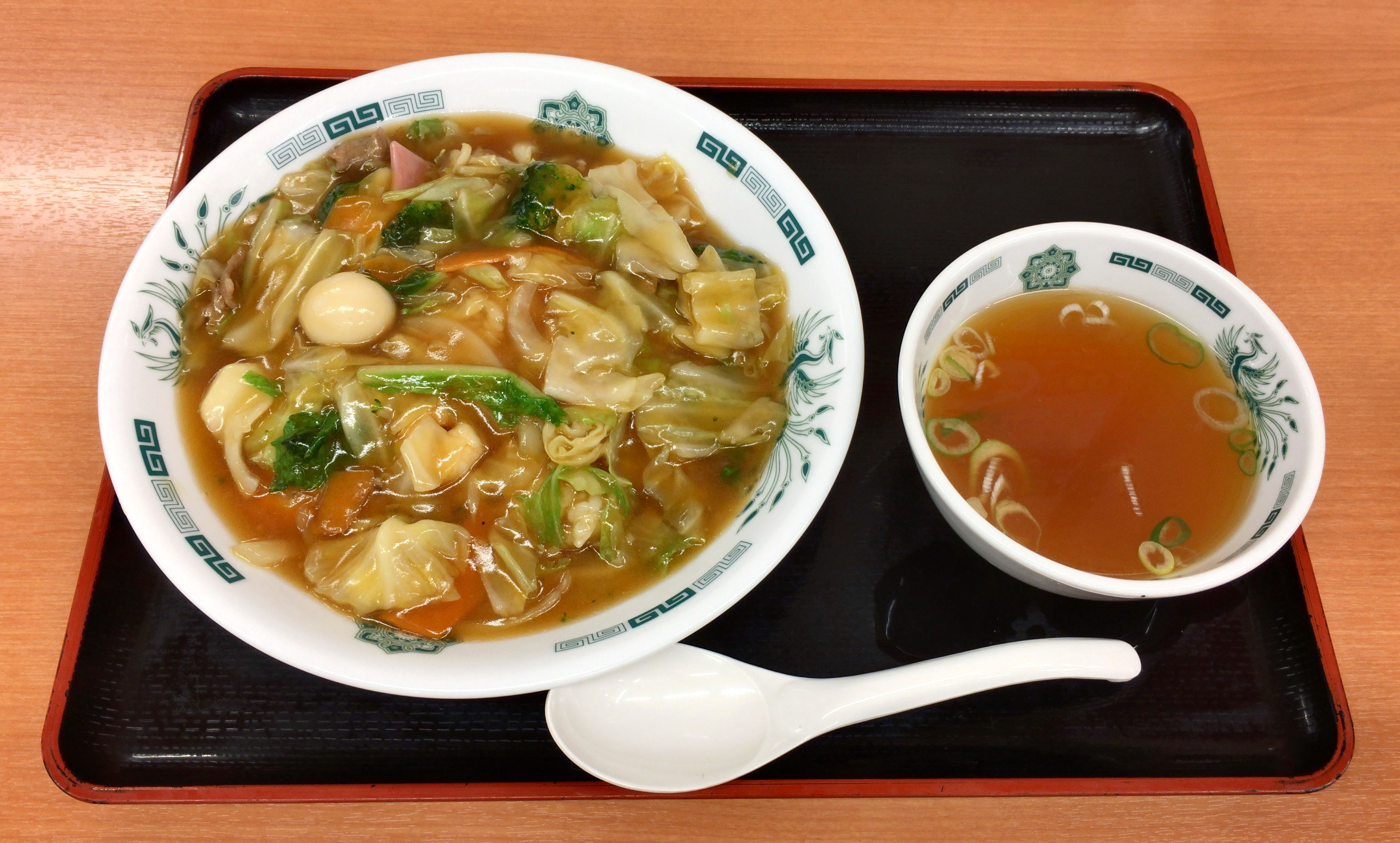
Chūkadon

Chūkadon (中華丼; literally "Chinese rice bowl") consists of a bowl of rice with stir-fried vegetables, onions, mushrooms, and thin slices of meat on top. This dish is similar to chop suey, and is sold at inexpensive Chinese restaurants in Japan.

== Gallery ==
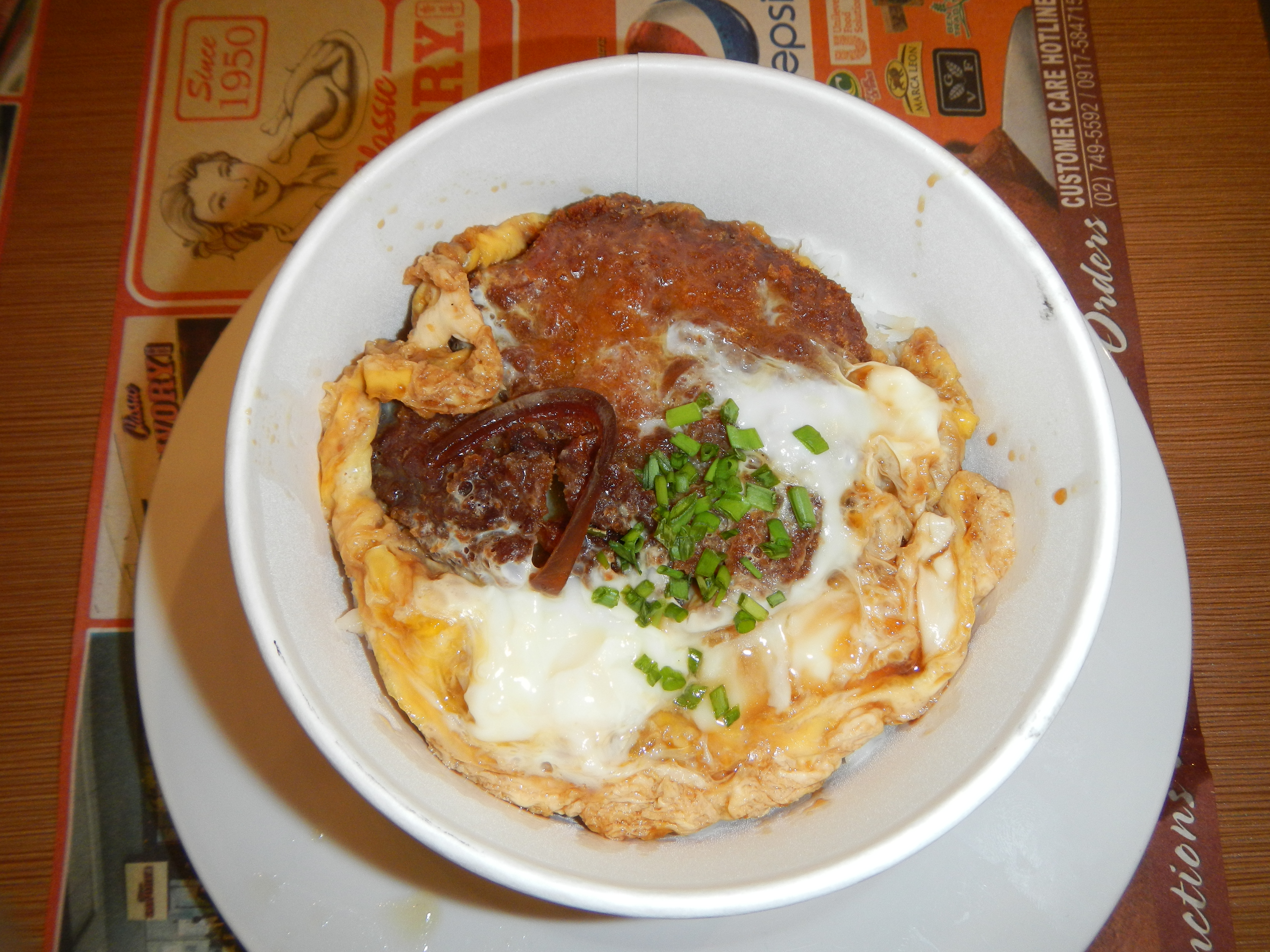
Pork sukiyakidon

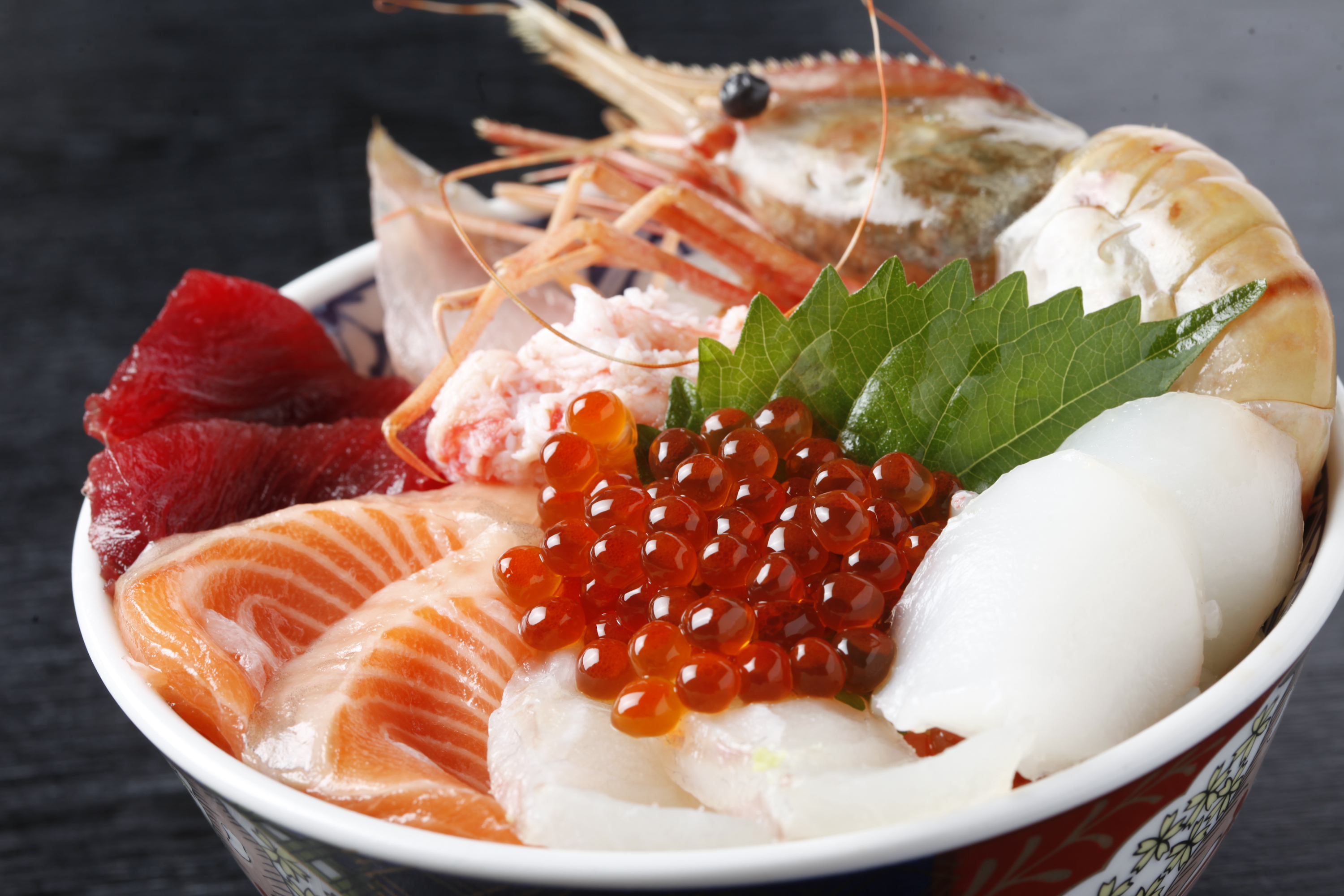
Kaisendon

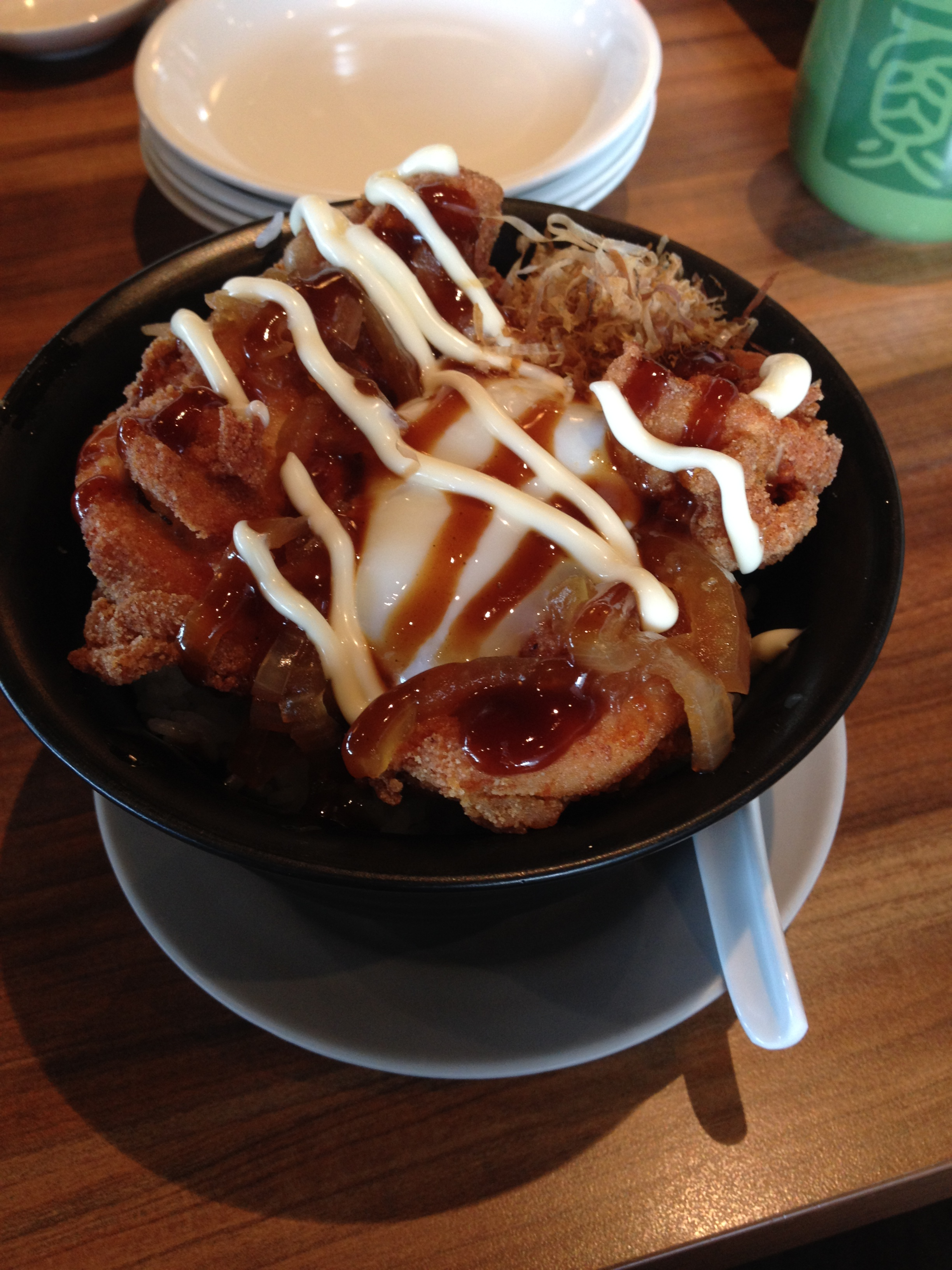
A bowl of Japanese rice topped with karaage chicken, soft-boiled egg, vegetables and topped with condiments

== See also ==
- Gaifan – similar Chinese dish
- Loco moco – similar Hawaiian dish
- Japanese cuisine
- List of Japanese dishes

== Bibliography ==
- Tsuji, Shizuo (1980). Japanese cooking: A simple art. New York: Kodansha International/USA. ISBN 0-87011-399-2.
