= Yuhan University =

University in Bucheon, South Korea

Coordinates: 37.48723°N 126.82056°E

- Hangul: 유한대학교
- Hanja: 柳韓大學校
- RR: Yuhan daehakgyo
- MR: Yuhan taehakkyo

Yuhan University is a private college in Sosa-gu, Bucheon City, Gyeonggi Province, South Korea. The current president is Kwon-Hyun Lee. It offers technical training in a variety of fields. The college's academic offerings are divided under five general divisions: Mechanical Engineering Division, Electrical and Electronic Engineering Division, Design Division, Computer and Management Division, and Social Affairs Division.

== History ==
Ground was broken for "Yuhan Technical Junior College" in late 1977, and classes began the following year. The first president was Chong Ryul Sohn. In 1979 it became Yuhan Technical College. In 1998 the current English name "Yuhan College" was adopted. The Korean name "Yuhan Daehakgyo" was adopted in 2011.

== Founding Philosophy ==
The profit derived from a business enterprise should be returned to the society which nourished the growth of the business. (The founder, Dr. Ilhan New (Yu Il-han) believed that education is one of the most important ways that fulfill the above philosophy.)

== School Motto ==
Be a freeman who dedicates himself to the peace of mankind.

== Notable alumni ==
- Sung Dong-il, actor

== See also ==
- Ilhan New
- Yuhan Corporation
- Education in South Korea
- List of universities and colleges in South Korea
