= Mein gon =

Type of noodle-shaped cracker

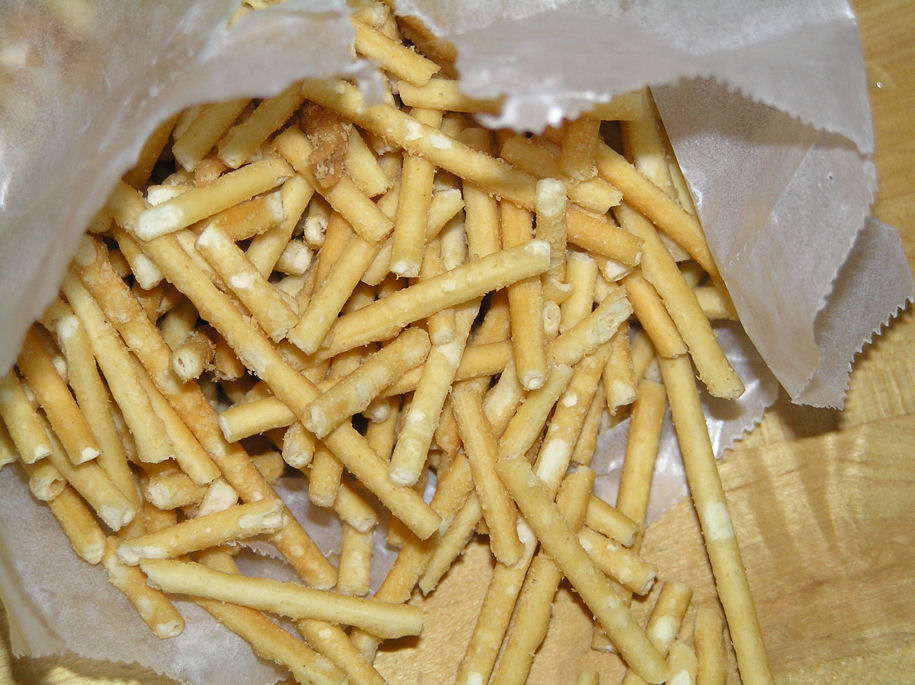
- Alternative names: Crunchy noodles
- Type: Cracker
- Place of origin: United States

Mein gon
- Traditional Chinese: 麵乾
- Simplified Chinese: 面干
Transcriptions
Standard Mandarin
- Hanyu Pinyin: miǎn gān
Yue: Cantonese
- Jyutping: min6 gon1

Mein gon (面干 miàn-gān), informally referred to as crunchy noodles or crunchy chow mein, are a type of noodle-shaped cracker (or dried biscuit) used in American Chinese cuisine.

== American Chinese cuisine ==
In American Chinese cuisine, the mein gon pieces are generally sprinkled into chicken chow mein, and then served together. Despite the informal English name referring to it as a noodle, it is not actually classified as a form of Chinese noodle.

It can also be crumbled and sprinkled onto American Chinese salad dishes, such as Chinese chicken salad, in a manner similar to croutons. Crunchy fried chow mein noodles are often served with duck sauce and Chinese hot mustard as an appetizer in American Chinese restaurants.

== See also ==
- Chinese noodle
- La Choy
