= Negitoro =

Japanese minced raw tuna

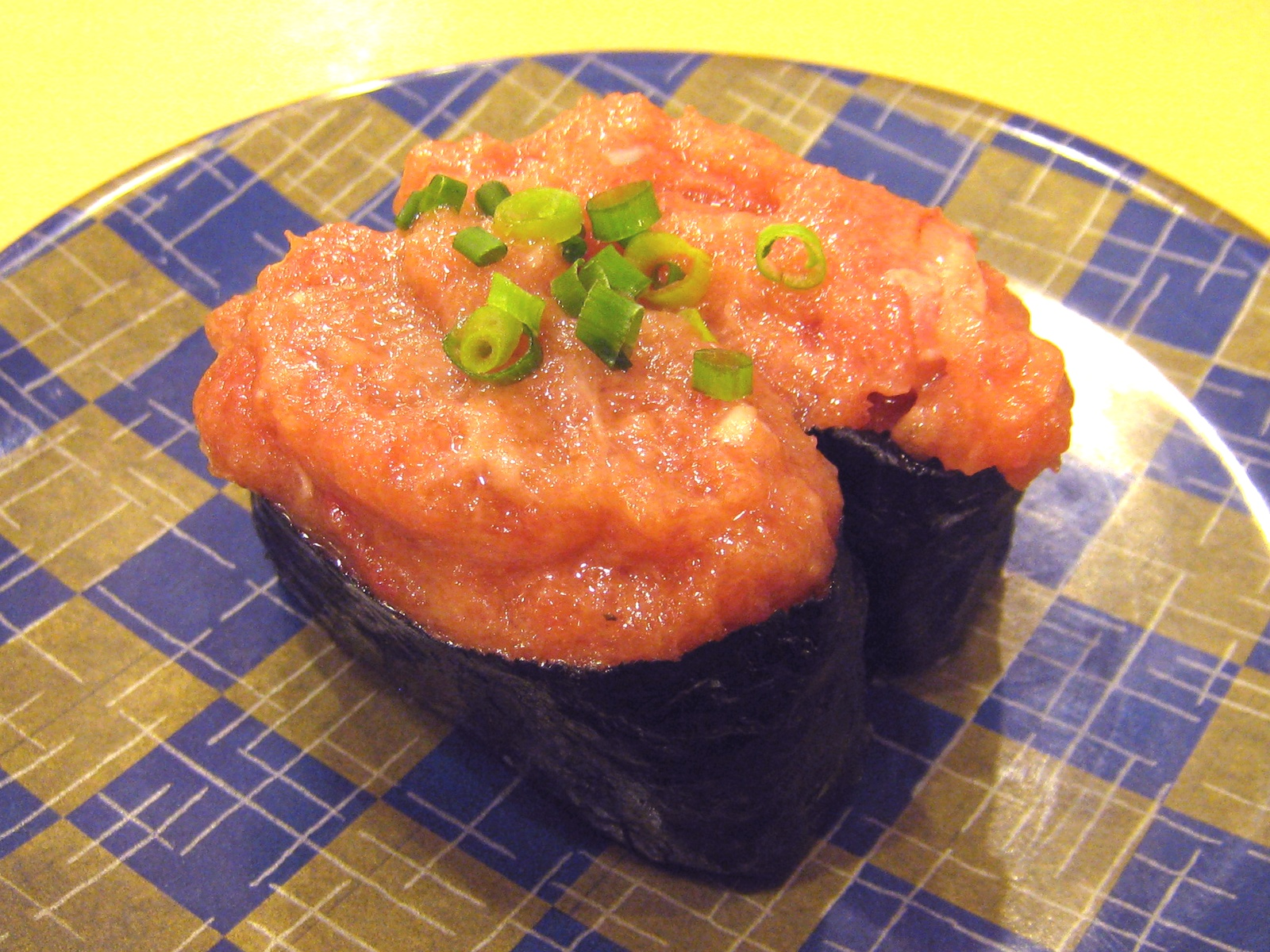
- Negitoro (raw minced tuna) on sushi, with negi
- Type: Sushi, donburi
- Place of origin: Japan
- Main ingredients: Raw tuna, negi

Negitoro (Japanese: ネギトロ) is a Japanese dish of minced raw tuna made from toro (the fatty parts of tuna), which is served with negi (green onion). It is typically served with rice, often as sushi or as rice bowl topping called negitorodon.

== Origin ==
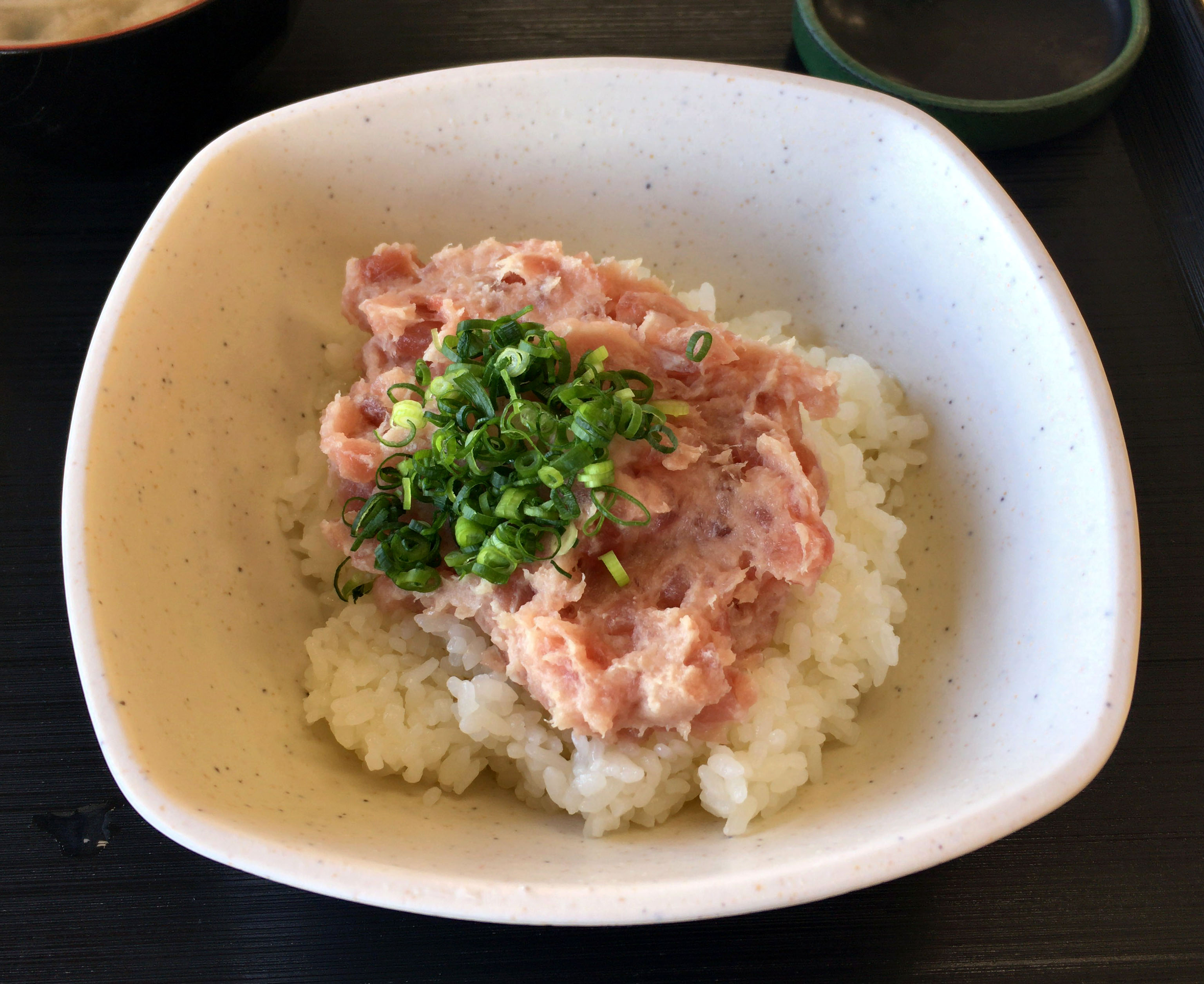
Negitoro-don

Negitoro sushi rolls may have originated in 1964, at a sushi restaurant in the Minowa neighborhood of Tokyo. Chefs at Kintaro Sushi initially prepared them for consumption at staff meals, and they were later offered to customers. After a positive reception, the main location of Kintaro (in Asakusa) added them to its menu. Another theory credits chef Hiromasa Sasaki with their invention, of the Ginza restaurant Sushi Sasaki.

== Etymology ==
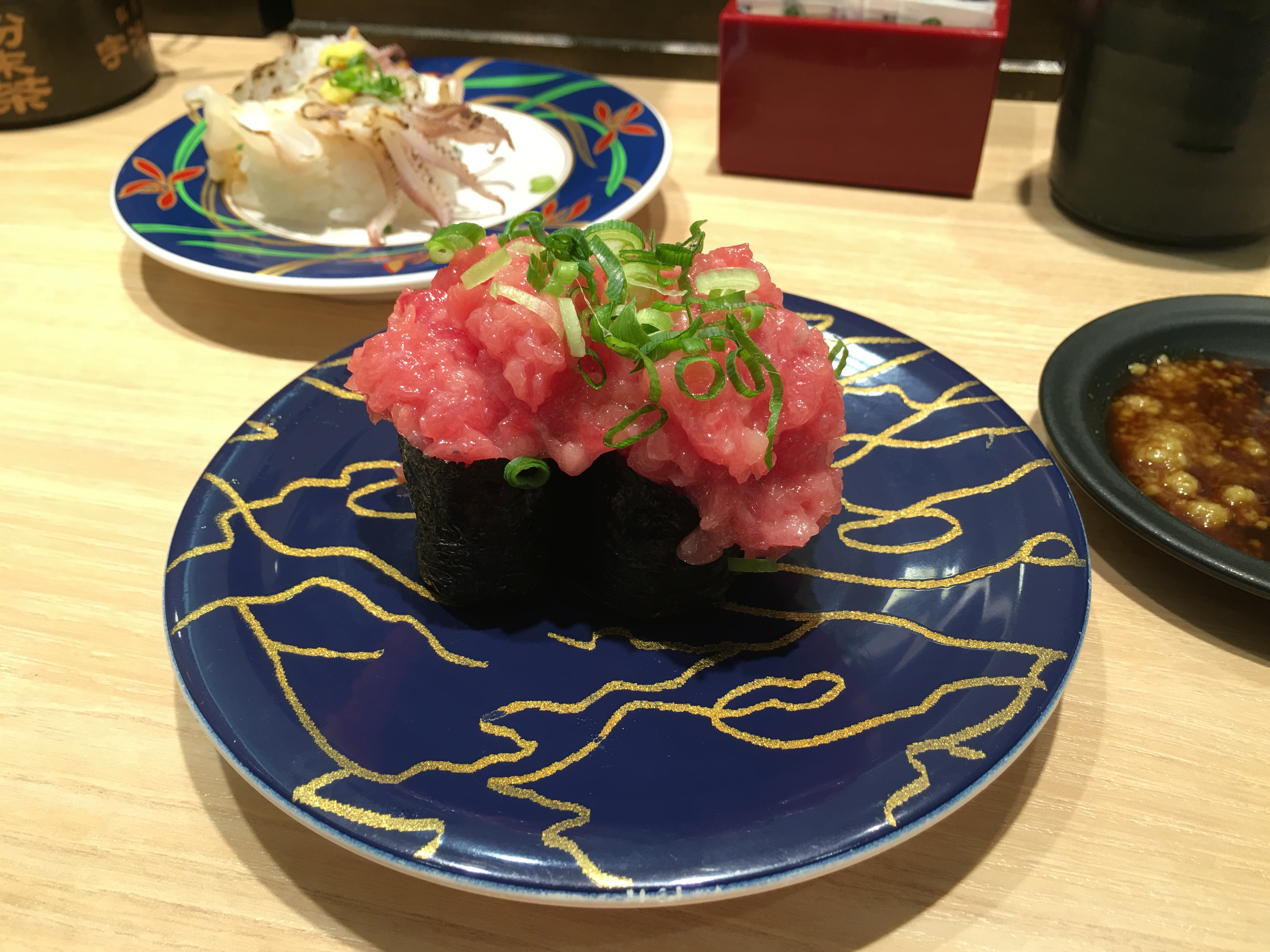
Negitoro in gunkanmaki

There are several hypotheses as to the origin of the name negitoro. The most common hypothesis is that the name is a combination of the words negi and toro, which refer to the two main ingredients.

In the 2000s, a hypothesis emerged that suggested that the name comes from negiru (Japanese: 根切る) or negitoru (Japanese: ねぎ取る) a term that refers to the removal of soil during construction projects to create space for foundations. In the context of the dish, the term is said to refer to meat being scraped. While tuna fishing groups support this hypothesis, dictionary editors question it and claim there is no verifiable usage of negitoru in this way, and thus the hypothesis cannot be sustained.

Some also hypothesize that the name may be a formation by analogy with mugitoro, another popular dish.

== Popularity ==
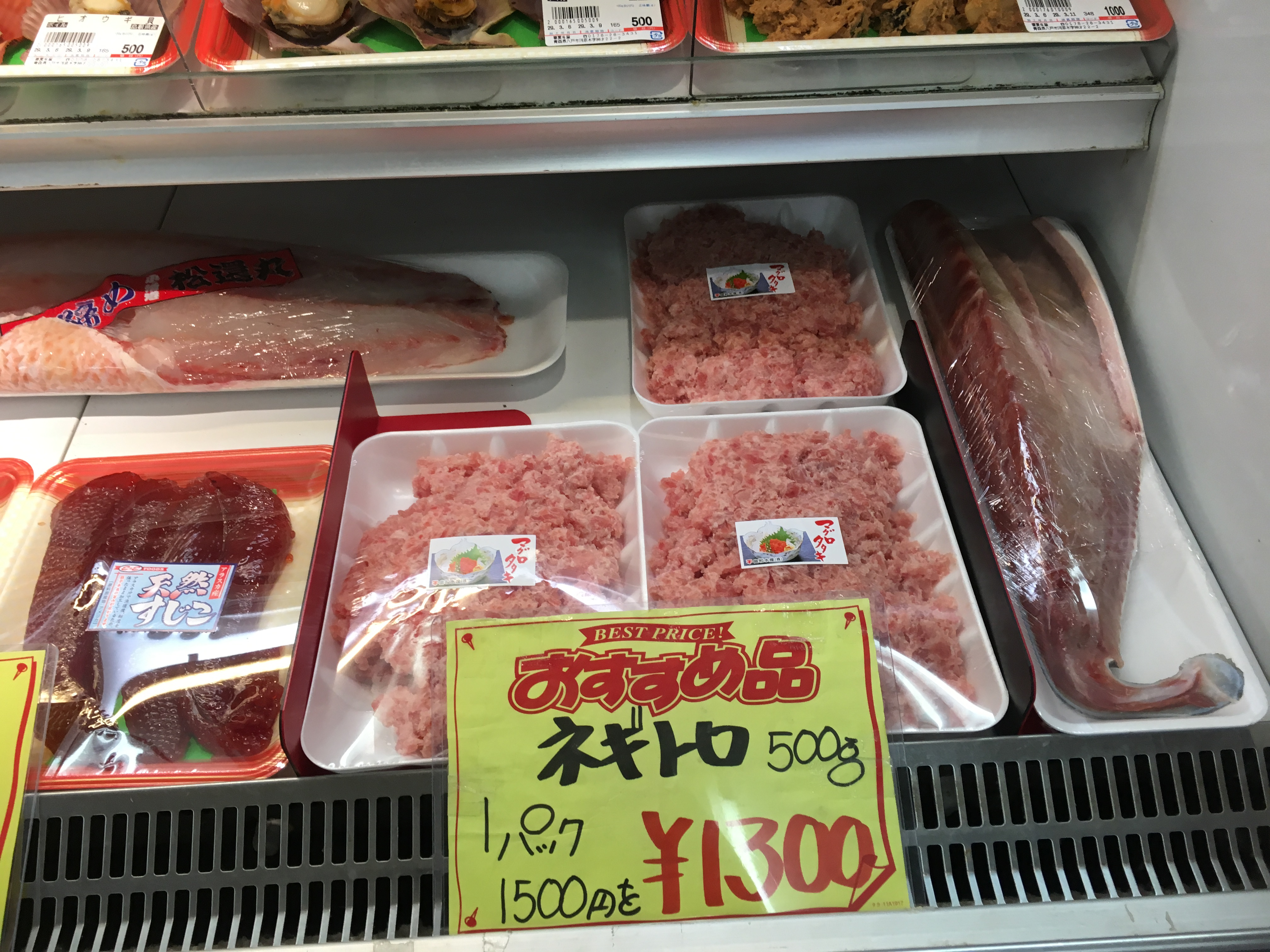
Negitoro at a supermarket

Negitoro sold to the mass market and distributed into retail channels like supermarkets is mass-produced in fish factories. They use lean meat of various fishes like yellowfin tuna, marlin, bigeye tuna, and albacore. These products often contain additives like vegetable oil, shortening, lard, antioxidants, and condiments. Dedicated fat products for the purpose of negitoro manufacturing have also been produced.

Japanese consumer groups and magazines have raised concerns about such practices being misleading and raising potential health concerns. However, there are also claims that unprocessed tuna mash is not popular.

Since the 1980s, negitoro sushi has become quite popular to serve with pungent vegetables, as many find the taste profiles of tori, green onion, and nori match well with these vegetables.

== Gallery ==
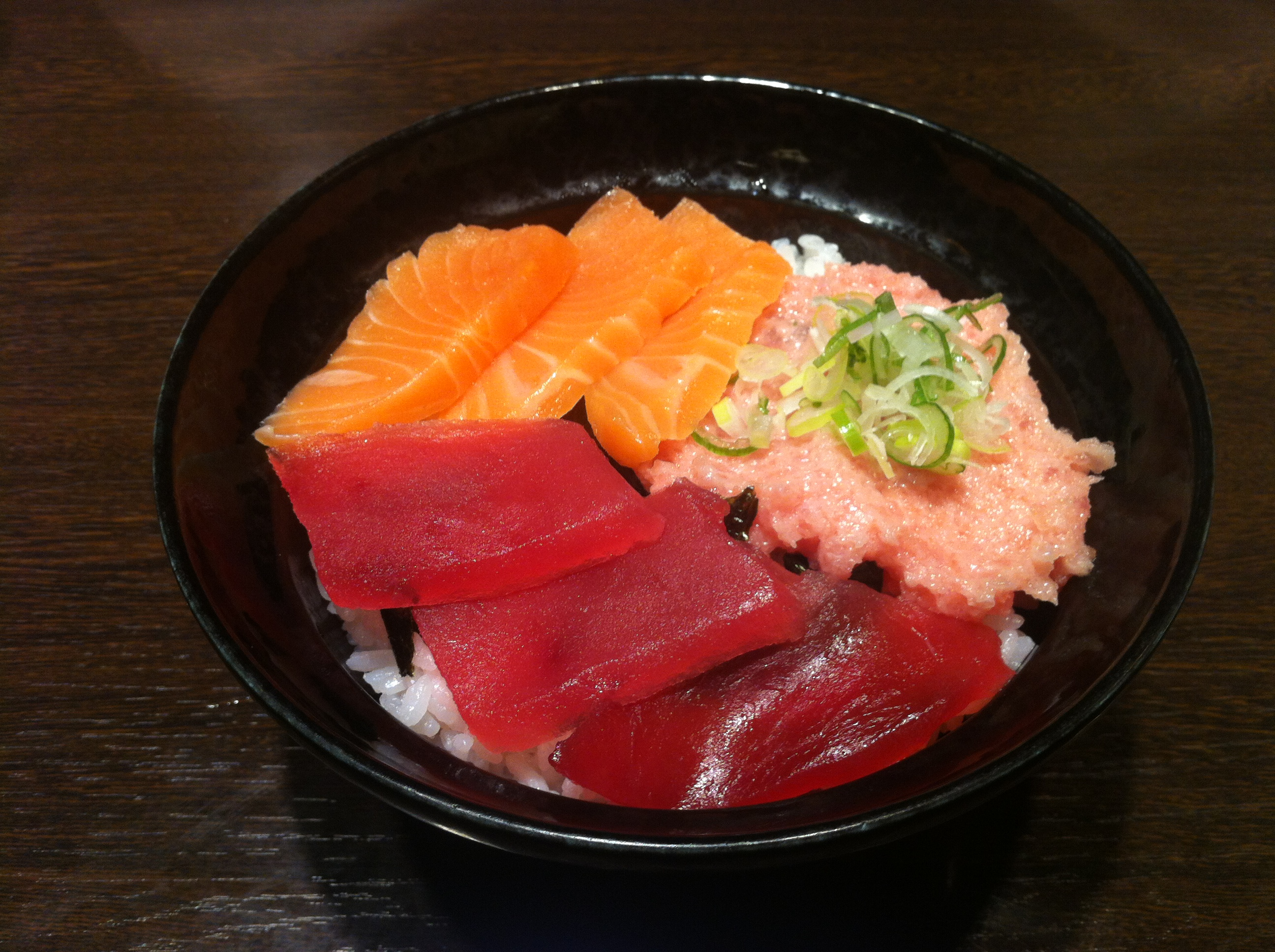
On kaisen-don

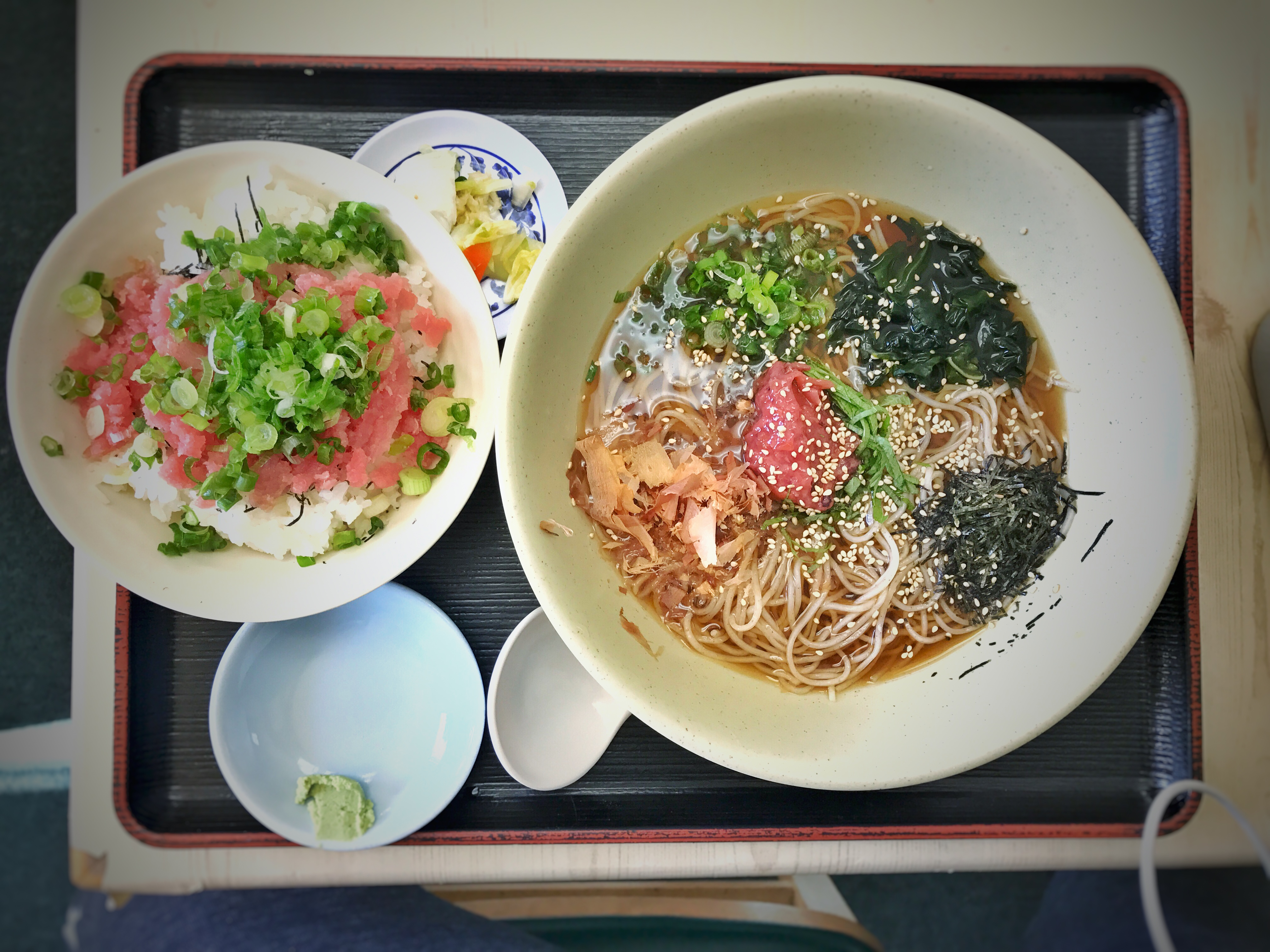
On rice and soba

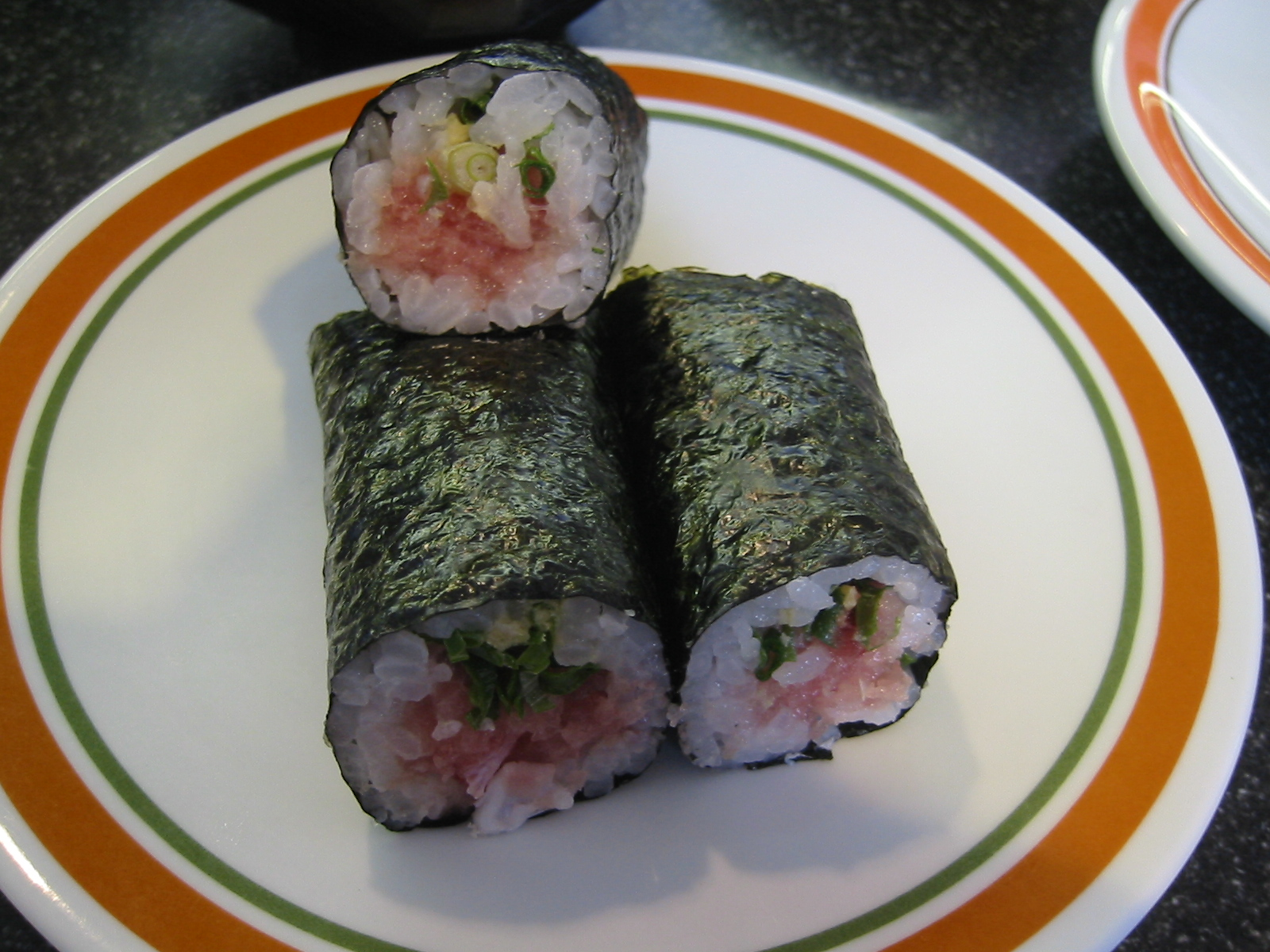
In makizushi

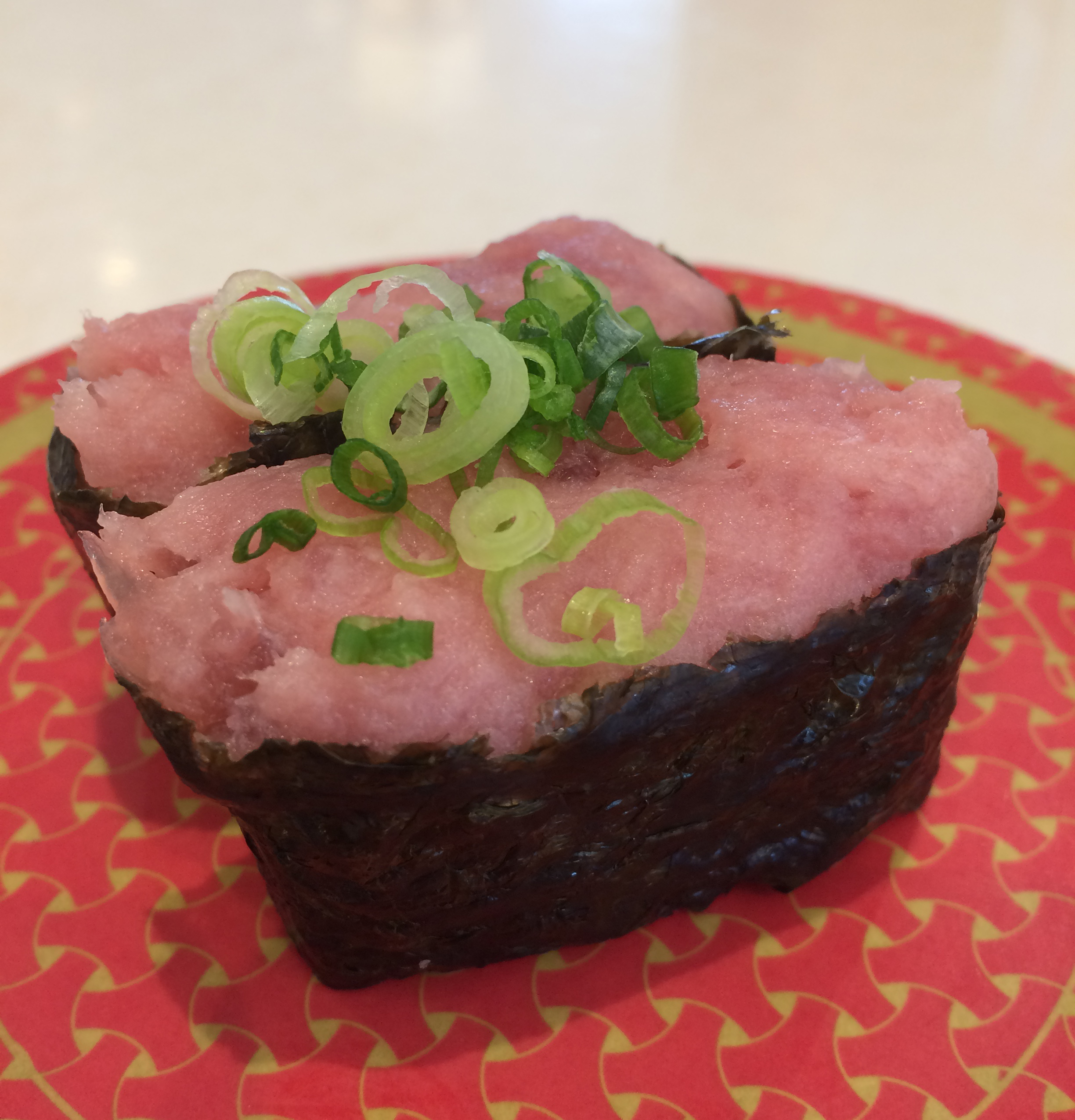
Kaiten sushi
