= Yuhan =

South Korean pharmaceutical company

Yuhan Corporation
- Native name: 주식회사 유한양행
- Company type: Public
- Traded as: KRX: 000100
- Industry: Pharmaceutical
- Founded: 1926; 100 years ago
- Founder: Ilhan New
- Headquarters: Seoul, South Korea
- Key people: Cho Wook-je (Chairman & CEO)
- Website: eng.yuhan.co.kr

- Yuhan
- Hangul: 유한양행
- Hanja: 柳韓洋行
- RR: Yuhan yanghaeng
- MR: Yuhan yanghaeng

Yuhan Corporation (Korean: 주식회사 유한양행; Hanja: 株式會社 柳韓洋行; RR: Jusik Hoesa Yuhan Yanghaeng) is a South Korean pharmaceutical and chemical company headquartered in Daebang-dong, Dongjak-gu, Seoul. It was established in 1926 by New Il-han and has been listed on the Korea Stock Exchange since 1962. Yuhan is one of the top Korean pharmaceutical companies, along with Celltrion, Samsung Biologics, GC Pharma, and Hanmi Pharmaceutical.

== Group families ==
- Yuhan-Kimberly
- Yuhan-Clorox Co., Ltd.
- Yuhan Chemical, Inc.
- Yuhan Medica Corporation
- Janssen Korea, Ltd.
- Gujarat Themis Biosyn, Ltd.(GTBL)

== Successive Chairmen ==
- Chairman
  - Yu Il-han (1951~1954/1957~1966/1969~1971)
  - Yeon Man-hui (1993~1996)
- Chief Executive Officer
  - Yu Il-han (1936~1942/1946/1948~1951/1955~1957/1966~1969)
  - Yu Myeong-han (1942~1946)
  - Gu Yeong-suk (1946~1948)
  - Yu Teu-kan (1951~1953)
  - Lee Geon-ung (1957~1961)
  - Baek Dae-hyeon (1961~1964)
  - Jo Dong-su (1964~1966)
  - Jo Gwon-sun (1969~1979)
  - BAK Chun-geo (1979~1985)
  - Hong Byeong-gyu (1985~1988)
  - Yeon Man-huiI (1988~1993)
  - Kim Tae-hun (1993~1997)
  - Kim Seon-jin (1997~2003)
  - Cha Jung-geun (2003~2009)
  - Kim Yun-seop (2009~2015)
  - Choe Sang-ghu (2009~2012)
  - Lee Jeong-hui (2015~2021)
  - Jo Uk-je (2021~ )

== Products ==
=== Yuhan Brands ===
- Pharmaceutical
- Non-Pharm/Medical Care
- Health Food
- Dental/Tooth Care
- Chemical Cosmetic
- Living Product
- Animal Pharmaceuticals

=== Other Brands ===
- Arm & Hammer

== Affiliates ==
=== Existence ===
- Yuhan Chemical
- Yuhan Medica
- Hanwha Chlorox: Manufacturer of Hanwha Lax and Hanwha Gen.
- Eucalix: Manufacturer of air fresheners, foaming soaps, and hand sanitizers.
- Immunoncia: Pharmaceutical developer.
- WiseMed: Manufacturer and seller of infusion solutions.
- AdPharma: R&D company for new and improved drugs.
- G.T.B.L: Local joint venture in India.
- YUHAN USA CORPORATION: A local subsidiary in the United States.
- yuhan yanghua hongkong limited: A local subsidiary in Hong Kong.
- YUHAN UZBEKISTAN: Local subsidiary in Uzbekistan.
- YUHAN ANZ Pty Ltd: A local subsidiary in Australia established in 2019.
- WARRANTECH: Dental implant manufacturer
- Yoohan Health Life: Formerly Yoohan Phyllia, a health supplement manufacturer.
- SB Biopharm: Manufacturer of veterinary drugs, veterinary quasi-drugs, and feed.

=== Past ===
- Yuhan Industries: Currently Yu Yu Pharmaceutical.
- Korean Motors: formerly known as Yuhan Motor Company.

== See also ==
- Yuhan University
