= Ilhan New =

South Korean businessman (1895–1971)

The Honourable Ilhan New
- Born: January 15, 1895; Pyongyang, Joseon
- Died: March 11, 1971 (aged 76); Seoul, South Korea
- Education: University of Michigan (B.Com., 1919); University of Southern California (MBA, 1941); Stanford University (J.D., 1948)

Korean name
- Hangul: 유일한
- Hanja: 柳一韓
- RR: Yu Ilhan
- MR: Yu Irhan

Ilhan New (Korean: 유일한; January 15, 1895 – March 11, 1971) was a Korean independence activist and entrepreneur. He was the founder of La Choy Food Products in the United States, and the South Korean pharmaceutical company Yuhan.

== Early life and education ==
New was born on January 15, 1895, in Pyongyang, Joseon (present-day North Korea), among nine brothers and sisters. His father, Yu Kiyŏn (유기연; 柳基淵), was originally from Yecheon, North Gyeongsang Province, but had settled in Pyongyang in order to do business. While there, Yu was baptised by American missionaries as a Christian. He came to work as a merchant that distributed Singer sewing machines in Korea.

New's father was passionate about education, and sent several of his children abroad to study. One of New's brothers went to the Russian Empire, another to China, and another to Japan. New was to study in the United States. In September 1904, New and two other Koreans (Note: Park Chang-hyŏn (박장현; 朴章鉉) and Park's nephew Park Yong-man (박용만; 朴容萬)) arrived at San Francisco by boat. He then went to live with an American family in the small farming town of Kearney, Nebraska. He lived there for seven years.

In 1909, from when he was 14 years old, he attended the Young Korean Military School (한인소년병학교) in Hastings during school vacations. The school's purpose was to train young Koreans to eventually fight to liberate Korea from Japan, which had then assumed indirect control over it and was quickly moving to formally annex it. The school was the first such training institution for the independence movement, and New was its youngest student. The school was reportedly rigorous, with students doing farmwork in the morning, doing military drills in the afternoon, and studying in the evening.

In 1911, New left Kearney (as it did not have a high school), and settled in Hastings. There, he worked a variety of part time jobs to support himself while attending school. He played on the school's football team in order to receive a sports scholarship.

During high school, his family fled to the Jiandao (Gando in Korean) region in Manchuria, in order to flee Japanese rule in Korea. His father asked for him to return to Korea and help take care of the family. New decided that by sending them money, he could better support them. He borrowed $100 from a bank and sent money to his family, then moved to work in Detroit, Michigan, until he could pay off the debt. Afterwards, he entered the University of Michigan in 1916, when he was 20 years old. He studied commerce there, and sold Eastern medicine products to Chinese students to support himself. After the outbreak of the 1919 March First Movement protests in Korea, New attended the April 14, 1919, First Korean Congress in Philadelphia. At the meeting, he chaired a committee that drafted a resolution that eventually went on to heavily inspire the Constitution of South Korea.

== Career ==
After completing his studies, he initially worked as an accountant at General Electric, which was considered a highly desirable position at the time. However, he left the company soon afterwards to found his own company.

In 1922, New founded La Choy Foods (라초이식품주식회사). Inspired by his experience selling products to Chinese Americans, New focused the business on the sale of mung bean sprouts (숙주나물), a common ingredient in East Asian cuisine. The business grew rapidly thanks to the Chinese American population, and he amassed hundreds of thousands of dollars in savings by 1926.

=== Yuhan Corporation ===
In 1925, New went to China on a business trip and to purchase bean sprouts. During this trip, he visited Korea, and was reportedly appalled at health conditions on the peninsula. He soon decided to close his successful business in the United States and relocate to Korea, in order to improve economic conditions there.

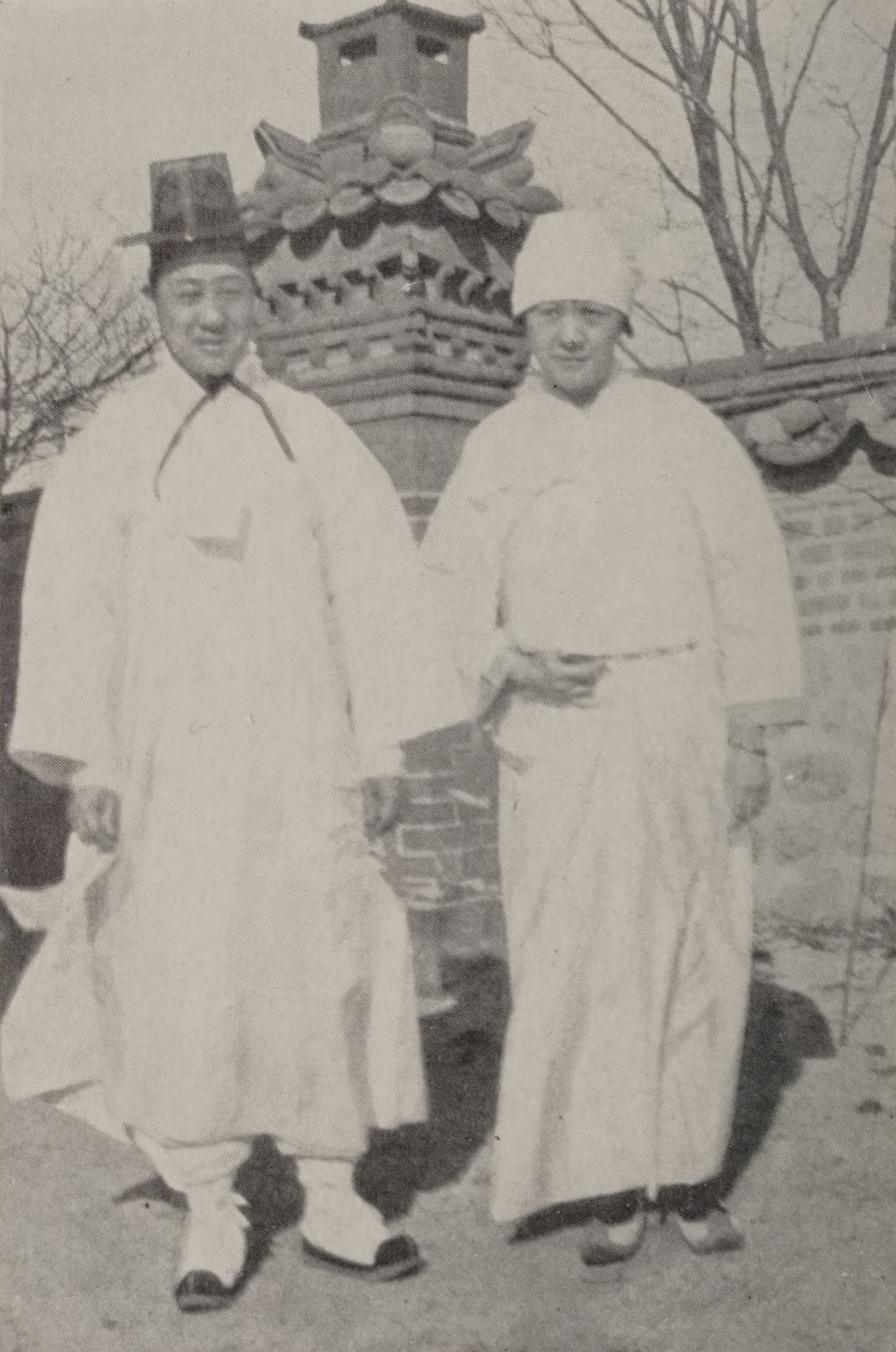
New and his wife, Mary Woo New, in Korea. They are wearing traditional Korean white clothing.

In October 1926, New returned to Korea with $500,000 in savings. That December, he established the pharmaceutical company Yuhan Corporation. New chose to enter the industry specifically to improve healthcare in Korea. He imported various medications from the United States and sold them to local hospitals.

The company achieved a number of historic firsts. It was the first Korean pharmaceutical company to be traded on a stock exchange, the first joint-stock Korean pharmaceutical company, and the first company in East Asia to sell the pharmaceutical prontosil. The business rapidly grew, and came to operate across much of East Asia, including Manchuria, China, and Vietnam. He reportedly focused on quality of life for his employees, and built them dormitories, facilities for child care, and swimming pools.

New also worked as a professor at Yunhee College (a predecessor to Yonsei University).

=== World War II ===
In April 1938, New left on an extended business trip across Europe and the United States. However, in 1939 World War II began. Making matters worse, the Japanese launched a surprise attack on Pearl Harbor in December 1941, which caused America to enter the Pacific War. Amidst these conflicts, New found himself unable to return to Korea. Meanwhile in Korea, the Japanese strictly regulated Yuhan Corporation, as they saw New as an American influence.

In 1941, he graduated with a Master of Business Administration degree from the University of California.

New actively participated in the Korean independence movement while in the United States. He participated in various Korean American support organizations for the Korean Provisional Government (KPG). He was recruited by the American Office of Strategic Services (OSS) as an advisor. In 1943, he authored a booklet entitled "Korea and the Pacific War" which was based on a report he prepared for the Office of Strategic Services (OSS). He also founded several schools. From January 1945, he secretly worked on Project NAPKO, a secret plan to send Koreans to infiltrate Korea and destabilize Japanese rule. New, then around 50 years old, trained for the mission and was made commander of a unit. However, it never came to pass, with the surprise of the atomic bombings of Hiroshima and Nagasaki and the surrender of Japan in August 1945.

=== Return to Korea ===
With the surrender of Japan, Korea was liberated. New returned to Korea in July 1946, and resumed management over the Yuhan Corporation. He was also made the first chairman of the Korea Chamber of Commerce and Industry. New enrolled in Stanford Law School in 1948, and graduated in 1953. During the 1950–1953 Korean War, the company was relatively unscathed.

New continued to work on various charitable causes. In 1953, he established the Korea Technical High School, and paid for both tuition and living expenses for the students.

== Later life and death ==
He worked at the company until his retirement in 1969. Unlike with other chaebol (South Korean family-owned conglomerates) of the time, New chose a successor who was not related to him by blood. However, two of the company's presidents were his siblings.

New died at the age of 76. In his will, he ordered most of his wealth be put into a public foundation called the Korean Society and Education Aid Trust Fund (한국사회 및 교육원조신탁기금; later renamed to the Yuhan Foundation). New's daughter Jae-Ra similarly donated most of her wealth to the foundation when she died in 1991.

== Legacy and honors ==
New received an honorary doctorate degree from Yonsei University in 1965. In 1970, he received the Order of Civil Merit (2nd class), and then the Order of Civil Merit (1st class) in 1971. He was posthumously awarded the Order of Merit for National Foundation by the government of South Korea in 1995.

== Personal life ==
By 1918, New was dating an ethnic Chinese woman, Hu Meili (Chinese: 胡美利; Korean: 호미리; RR: Ho Miri). They married in 1925. In 1928, he published an English-language autobiography entitled When I Was a Boy in Korea.
