= Subgum =

Chinese dishes with multiple ingredients

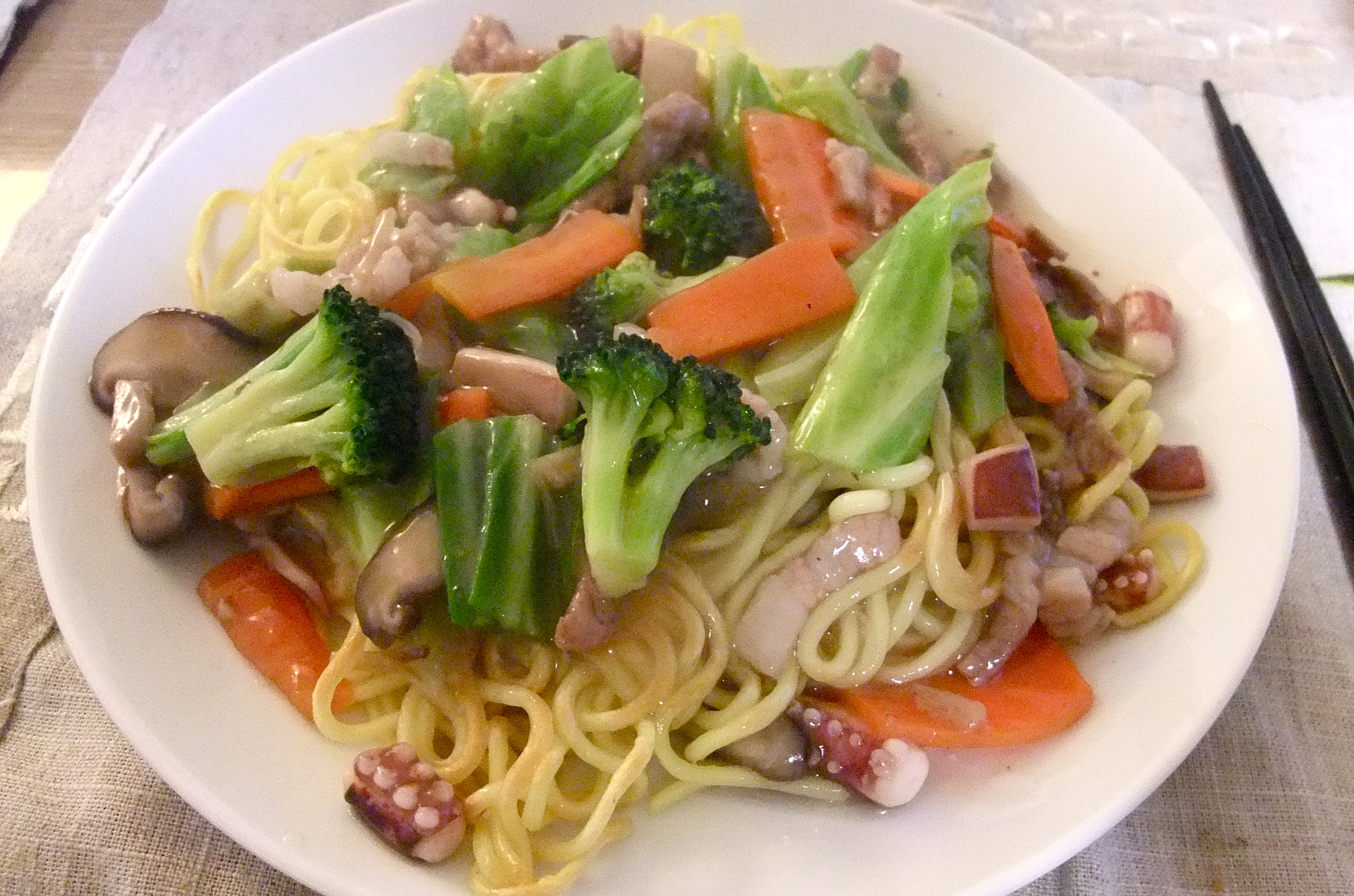
- Subgum chow mein
- Alternative names: shí jǐn
- Place of origin: Chinese
- Main ingredients: meats, seafood, vegetables

Subgum or sub gum (simplified Chinese: 什锦; traditional Chinese: 什錦; pinyin: shí jǐn; Jyutping: sap^{6} gam^{2}; lit. 'assorted brocades', metaphorically "numerous and varied") is a type of Chinese dish in which one or more meats or seafood are mixed with vegetables and sometimes also noodles, rice, or soup. It originates in Cantonese cuisine and is a common dish on the menus of Chinese restaurants in North America.

== In the United States ==
The earliest known mention of subgum is in 1902 in a list of Chinese dishes in the Chicago Daily Tribune. An early indirect mention of sub-gum is in 1906; in 1909, there is a more explicit reference to sub gum deang at a Chicago restaurant and in 1913, to sub gum gai suey at a New York City restaurant.

== See also ==
- American Chinese cuisine
- Chop suey
- Champon
