= Chop suey =

Dish in overseas Chinese cuisine

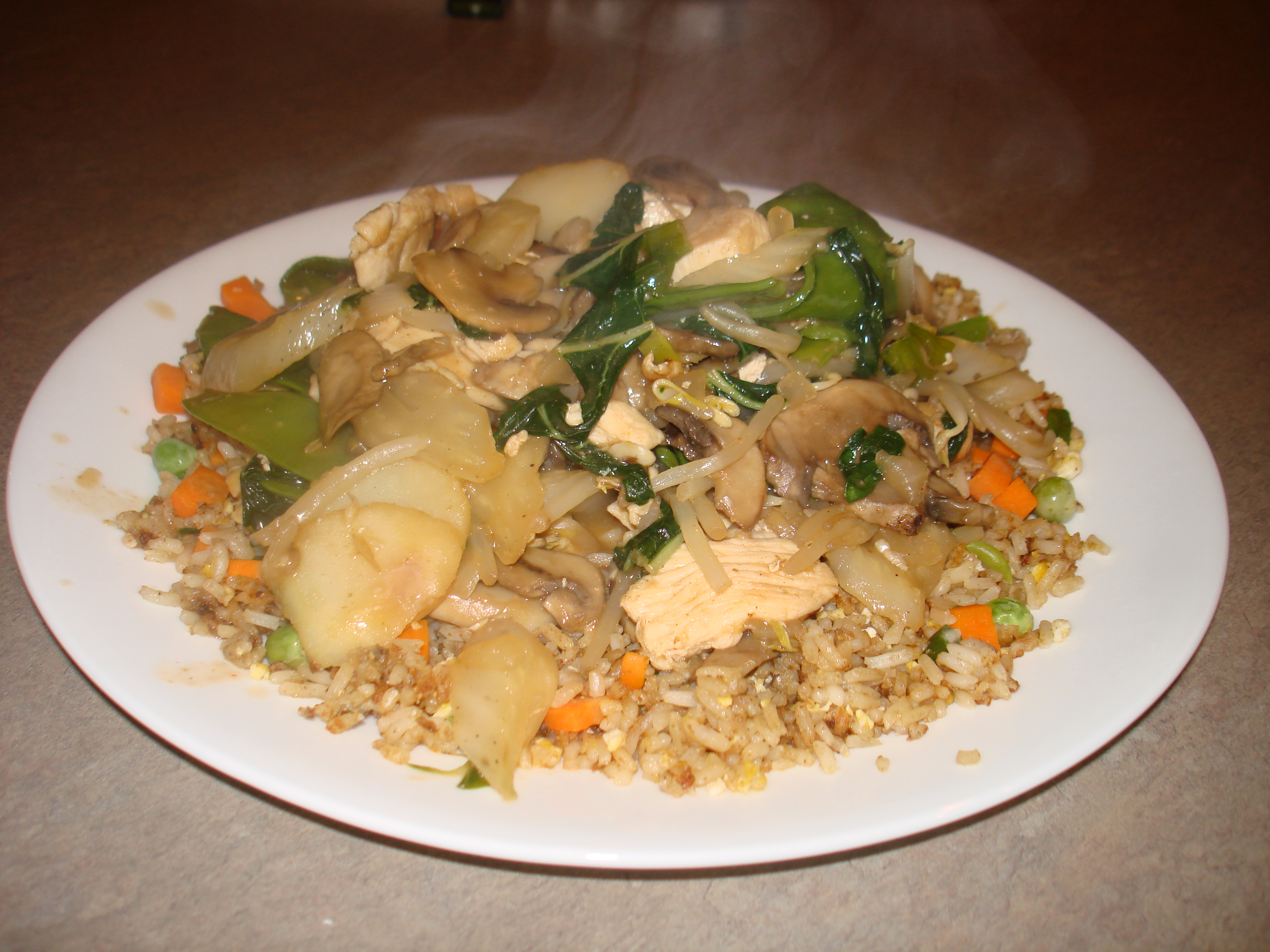
- Cab coi fan
- Traditional Chinese: 雜碎
- Simplified Chinese: 杂碎
- Hanyu Pinyin: zá suì
- Jyutping: zaap6 seoi3
- Literal meaning: (probably): odds and ends; assorted pieces/mixed and broken
Transcriptions
Standard Mandarin
- Hanyu Pinyin: zá suì
Hakka
- Romanization: cab sui
Yue: Cantonese
- Yale Romanization: jaahp seui
- Jyutping: zaap6 seoi3

Za cai
- Traditional Chinese: 雜菜
- Simplified Chinese: 杂菜
- Hanyu Pinyin: zá cài
Transcriptions
Standard Mandarin
- Hanyu Pinyin: zá cài
Hakka
- Romanization: cab coi
Southern Min
- Hokkien POJ: cha̍p-chhài
- Tâi-lô: tsa̍p-tshài

Chop suey (usually pronounced /ˈtʃɒpˈsuːi/) is a dish from overseas Chinese cuisine, generally consisting of meat (usually chicken, pork, beef, shrimp or fish) and eggs, cooked quickly with vegetables such as bean sprouts, cabbage, and celery, and bound in a starch-thickened sauce. It is typically served with rice, but can become the Chinese-American form of chow mein with the substitution of stir-fried noodles for rice.

Chop suey has become a prominent part of American Chinese cuisine, British Chinese cuisine, Cambodian Chinese cuisine, Canadian Chinese cuisine, Thai Chinese cuisine, Indian Chinese cuisine, Polynesian cuisine and many other cuisines around the world who have their own versions of the dish. In Chinese Indonesian cuisine it is known as cap cai (tjap tjoi) (雜菜, "mixed vegetables") and mainly consists of vegetables.

== Origins ==
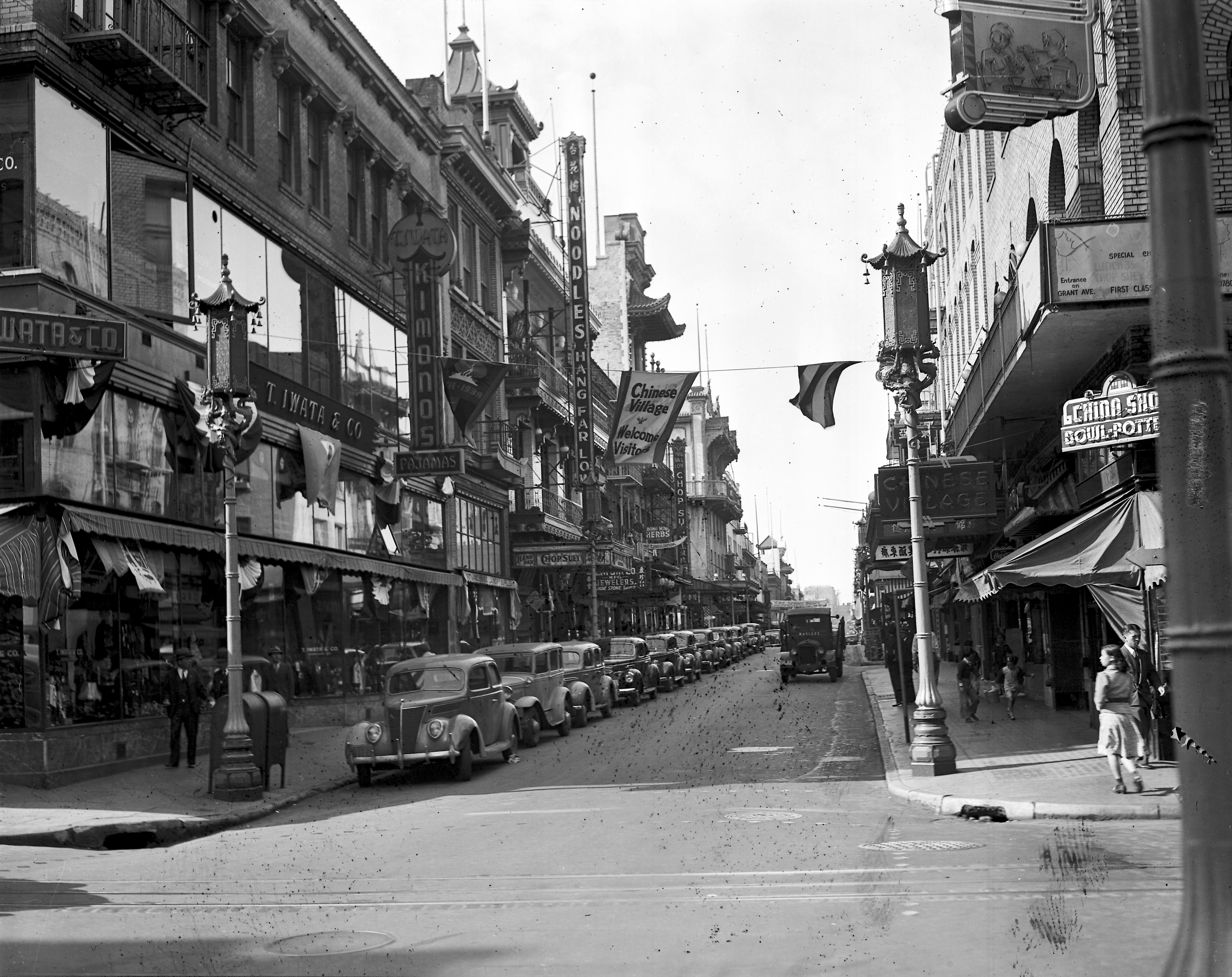
Chop suey neon signs, Grant Avenue, San Francisco, circa 1943

Chop suey is widely believed to have been developed in the U.S. by Chinese Americans. However, the anthropologist E. N. Anderson traces the dish to tsap seui (杂碎, "miscellaneous leftovers"), common in Taishan, Guangdong (Toisan) – the home of many early Chinese immigrants to the United States. Hong Kong doctor Li Shu-fan likewise reported that he knew it in Toisan in the 1890s. Charles Hayford argues that the dish was not invented per se, but rather was collectively adopted by Chinese American restaurants when the owners saw an opportunity to have a dish that Americans would like.

The long list of conflicting stories about the origin of chop suey is, in the words of food historian Alan Davidson, "a prime example of culinary mythology" and typical of popular foods.

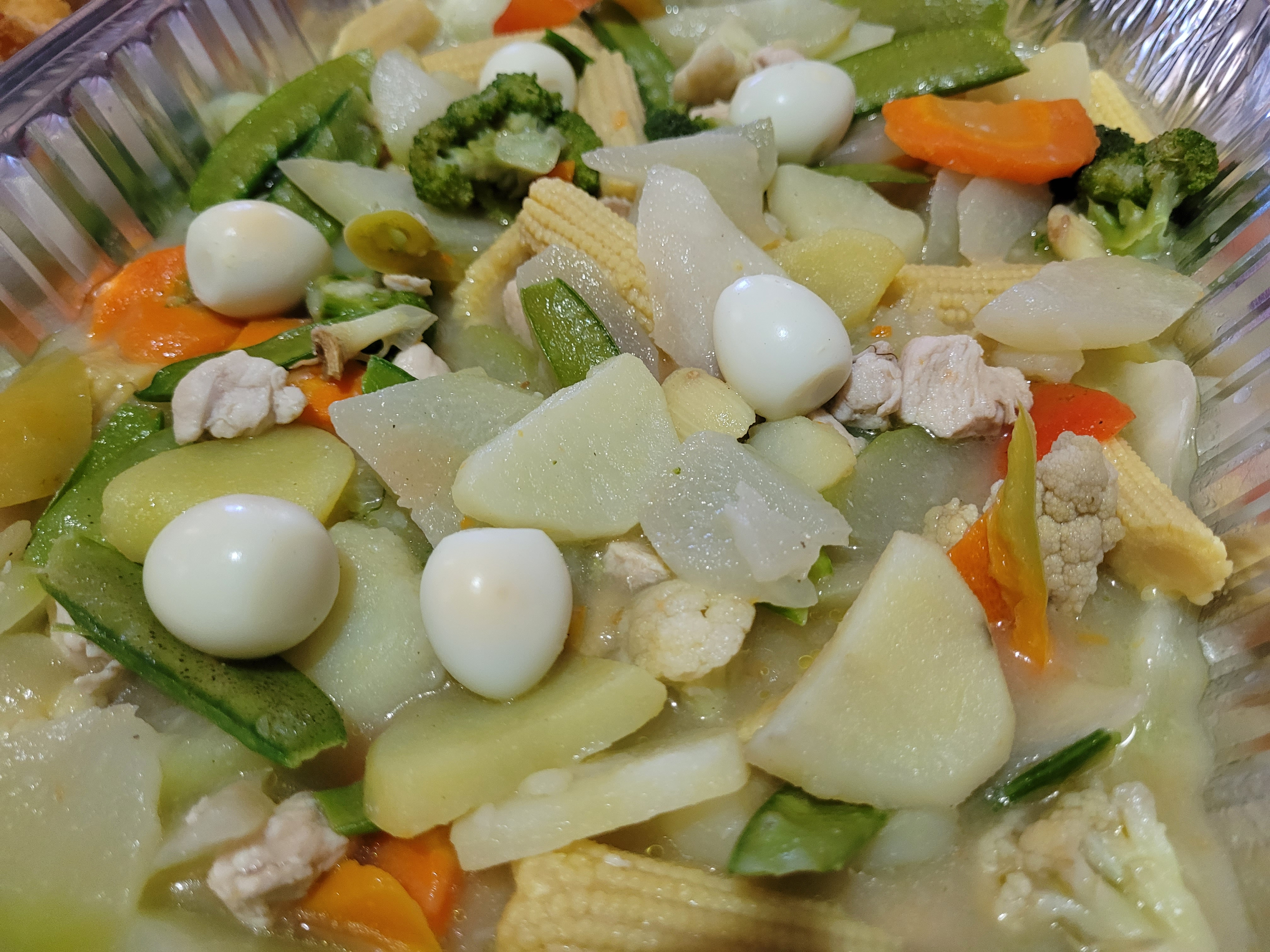
Filipino chop suey, introduced during the American colonial period of the Philippines

One account claims that it was invented by Chinese American cooks working on the transcontinental railroad in the 19th century. Another tale is that it was created during Qing dynasty premier Li Hongzhang's visit to the United States in 1896 by his chef, who tried to create a meal suitable for both Chinese and American palates. Another story is that Li wandered to a local Chinese restaurant after the hotel kitchen had closed, where the chef, embarrassed that he had nothing ready to offer, came up with the new dish using scraps of leftovers. Yet recent research by the scholar Renqiu Yu led him to conclude that "no evidence can be found in available historical records to support the story that Li Hung Chang [Li Hongzhang] ate chop suey in the United States". Li brought three Chinese chefs with him, and would not have needed to eat in local restaurants or invent new dishes in any case. Yu speculates that shrewd Chinese American restaurant owners took advantage of the publicity surrounding his visit to promote chop suey as Li's favorite.

Another myth is that, in the 1860s, a Chinese restaurant cook in San Francisco was forced to serve something to drunken miners after hours, when he had no fresh food. To avoid a beating, the cook threw leftover meat and vegetables into a wok and served it to the miners, who loved it and asked what dish it was—he replied "chopped sui". There is no good evidence for any of these stories.

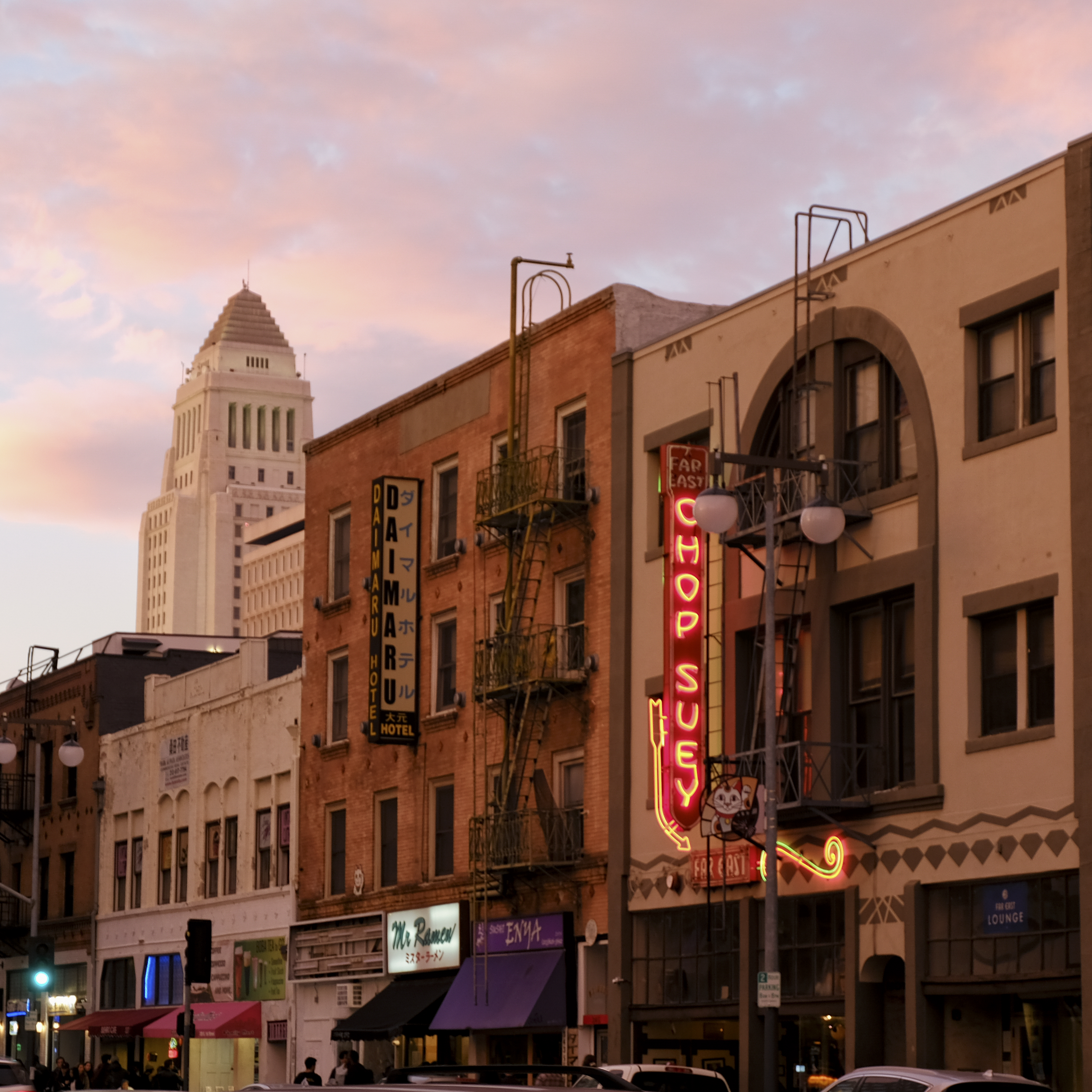
Far East Chop Suey restaurant in Little Tokyo, Los Angeles

Chop suey appears in an 1884 article in the Brooklyn Eagle, by Wong Chin Foo, "Chinese Cooking", in which he says it "may be justly termed the national dish of China". An 1885 article in the Brooklyn Union referred to "chop-sui" as "a peculiar sort of hash", saying it was "made of the Lord knows what, but sliced bamboo, kidneys, celery and spices were certainly used in the composition". While admitting that "the queer mixture, provided the eater does not investigate it too carefully, can be eaten", the article added that "an every-day American would certainly not hanker after it a second time". In 1888 Wong wrote that a "staple dish for the Chinese gourmand is chow chop svey [sic], a mixture of chickens' livers and gizzards, fungi, bamboo buds, pigs' tripe, and bean sprouts stewed with spices". An 1896 newspaper report states: "Chow chop suey is a sort of stew made of chicken's livers and gizzards, calves' tripe, bean sprouts, celery and 'meu', which is a sort of Chinese first cousin to macaroni". An article in The Illustrated American on Chinese cuisine in 1897, reproduces a menu from Ma Hung Low's restaurant on Mott Street in New York's Chinatown quarter which includes the dish "Beef Chop Suey with Bean Sprouts, Water Chestnuts and Boiled Rice". The dish itself, referred to as "the standard Chinese dish of chop suey", is described as "a stew of beef, chicken, or pork, with bean sprouts, mushrooms, water-lily roots, sprouted grain and unknown flavorings". In 1898, it is described as "A Hash of Pork, with Celery, Onions, Bean Sprouts, etc."

During his travels in the United States, Liang Qichao, a Guangdong (Canton) native, wrote in 1903 that there existed in the United States a food item called chop suey which was popularly served by Chinese restaurateurs, but which local Chinese people do not eat, because the cooking technique is "really awful".

In earlier periods of Chinese history, chop suey or chap sui in Cantonese, and za sui, in Mandarin, has different meanings of cooked animal offal or entrails. The term za sui (杂碎) is listed in Chinese-English dictionaries as referring to offal, while炒杂碎 is translated as chop suey.

In 2012, Andrew Coe, who wrote Chop Suey – A Cultural History of Chinese Food in the United States, stated that in chop suey's period of peak popularity, chop suey restaurants attracted "an interesting crowd of artists and theater people and the kind of like demimonde" and that chop suey "was exotic" and "like sushi is today".

Hayford stated that the popularity of chop suey declined after a new interest in China and new immigration into the United States in the mid-20th century pushed new dishes into prominence while chop suey became perceived as inauthentic. Chop suey especially declined in popularity on the West Coast and the East Coast with new Chinese immigration and with more diverse types of food available, while it retained more prominence in the American Midwest, where there was less Chinese immigration. St. Louis, Missouri, as of 2012, continued to have a number of chop suey restaurants in low-income neighborhoods.

== See also ==
- American chop suey
- Chinatowns in the United States
- Cap cai
- Chop Suey! (song)
- Chop suey font
- Japchae
- Subgum
