= Wonton =

Type of Chinese dumpling

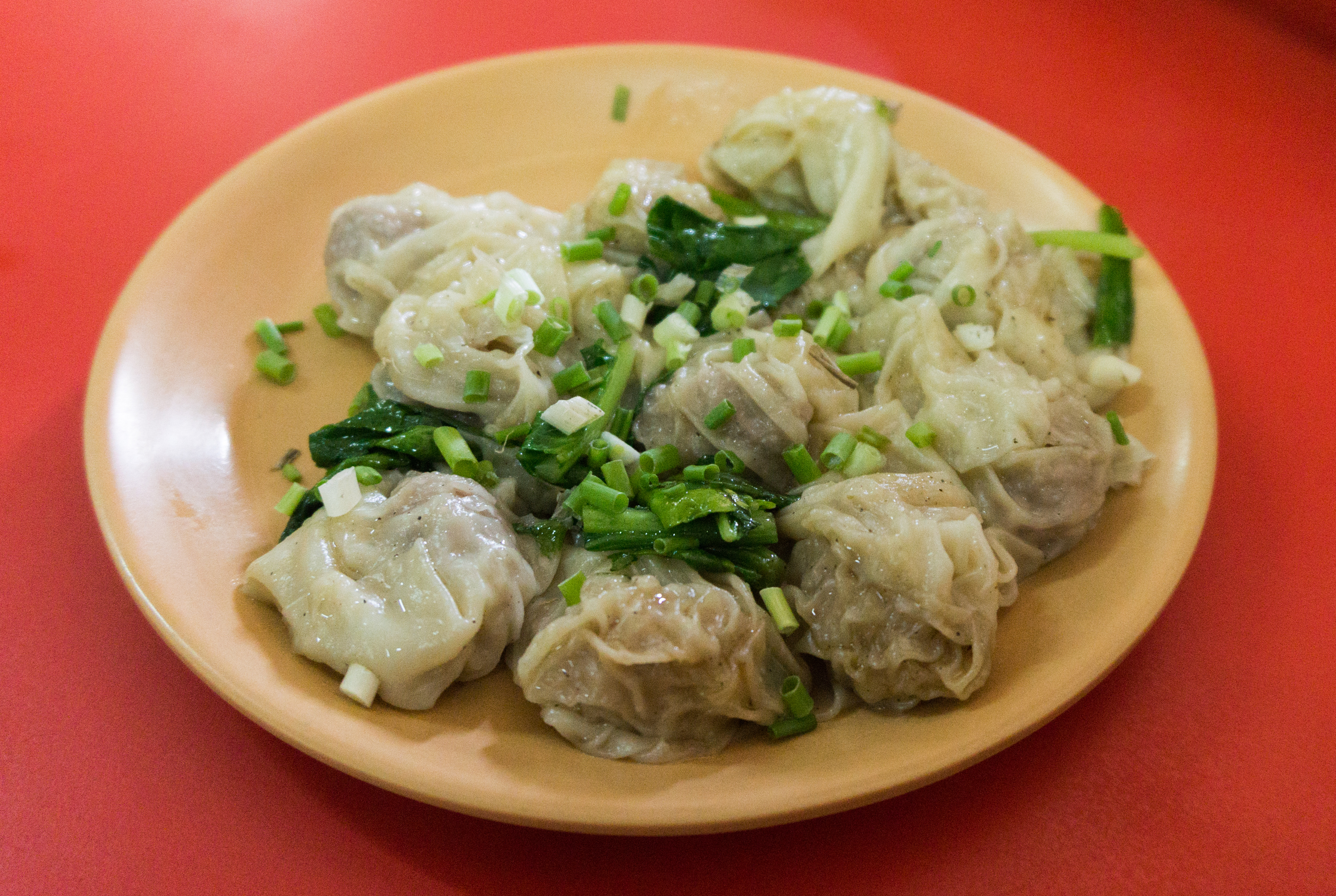
- A plate of steamed wontons
- Alternative names: Huntun, wuntun, wantan, wenden, pian-sit
- Place of origin: China
- Main ingredients: Dough, egg, pork, shrimp, chicken, spring onion
- Variations: Dumpling

Chinese name
- Traditional Chinese: 1. 餛飩; 2. 雲吞; 3. 抄手
- Simplified Chinese: 1. 馄饨; 2. 云吞; 3. 抄手
- Literal meaning: 1. food-chaos; 2. cloud swallow; 3. crossed hands
Transcriptions
Standard Mandarin
- Hanyu Pinyin: 1. húntun; 2. yúntūn
- Bopomofo: 1. ㄏㄨㄣˊ ㄊㄨㄣ˙; ㄩㄣˊ ㄊㄨㄣ˙
- Wade–Giles: 1. hun^{2}-tun^{0}; 2. yün^{2}-tun^{0}
- Tongyong Pinyin: 1. hún-tu̇n; 2. yún-tu̇n
- IPA: 1. [xwə̌n.tʰwən]; 2. [y̌n.tʰwən]
other Mandarin
- Sichuanese Pinyin: 3. cao^{1} sou^{3}
Wu
- Romanization: 1. wen den
Gan
- Romanization: 1. chin thon (Pha̍k-oa-chhi)
Yue: Cantonese
- Yale Romanization: 1. wàhn tān; 2. wàhn tān
- Jyutping: 1. wan4 tan1; 2. wan4 tan1
- IPA: [wɐn˩.tʰɐn˥]
Southern Min
- Hokkien POJ: 1. hûn-thun; 4. chheng-thng

A wonton (traditional Chinese: 餛飩; simplified Chinese: 馄饨; pinyin: húntun; Jyutping: wan4 tan1) is a type of Chinese dumpling commonly found across regional styles of Chinese cuisine. It is also spelled wantan or wuntun, a transliteration from Cantonese wan4 tan1 (雲吞/云吞), and wenden from Shanghainese hhun den (餛飩/馄饨). Even though there are many different styles of wonton served throughout China, Cantonese wontons are the most popular in the West due to the predominance of Cantonese restaurants overseas.

Wontons, which have their origins in China, have achieved significant popularity in East Asian cuisine, as well as across various Southeast Asian culinary traditions.

== Names ==
In Mandarin, they are called huntun (simplified Chinese: 馄饨; traditional Chinese: 餛飩; pinyin: húntun).

In Cantonese, 馄饨 is pronounced wantan (Jyutping: wan4 tan1; Cantonese Yale: wàhn tān), more commonly written as the homophonic simplified Chinese: 云吞; traditional Chinese: 雲吞; lit. 'cloud swallow'. One rationalization is that this because when they are cooked, the dumplings float in the broth like small clouds.

In the Hokkien language, they are called Pián-si̍t (Chinese: 扁食; pinyin: Pián-si̍t; lit. 'flat food').

== History ==
Yang Xiong from the western Han dynasty mentioned "bing wei zhi tun", which means wontons are a type of bread. The difference is that wontons have fillings inside and are eaten after being steamed or boiled.

The ancient Han Chinese thought wonton were a sealed bun, lacking "qi qiao" ('seven orifices'), so it was called "hun dun" (混沌), which means 'turbidity' or 'chaos'. Based on the Chinese method of making written characters, the radicals are changed from water to food; then, they became "hun tun" (餛飩, wonton in Cantonese). At that time, wonton had no difference from dumplings.

For centuries, the popularity and affinity of dumplings had not changed among the Han Chinese, but wontons eventually became popular in southern China and developed a distinct culinary style. From the time of the Tang dynasty, the Chinese began to differentiate the names of dumplings (jiaozi) and wontons.

== Differences from jiaozi ==
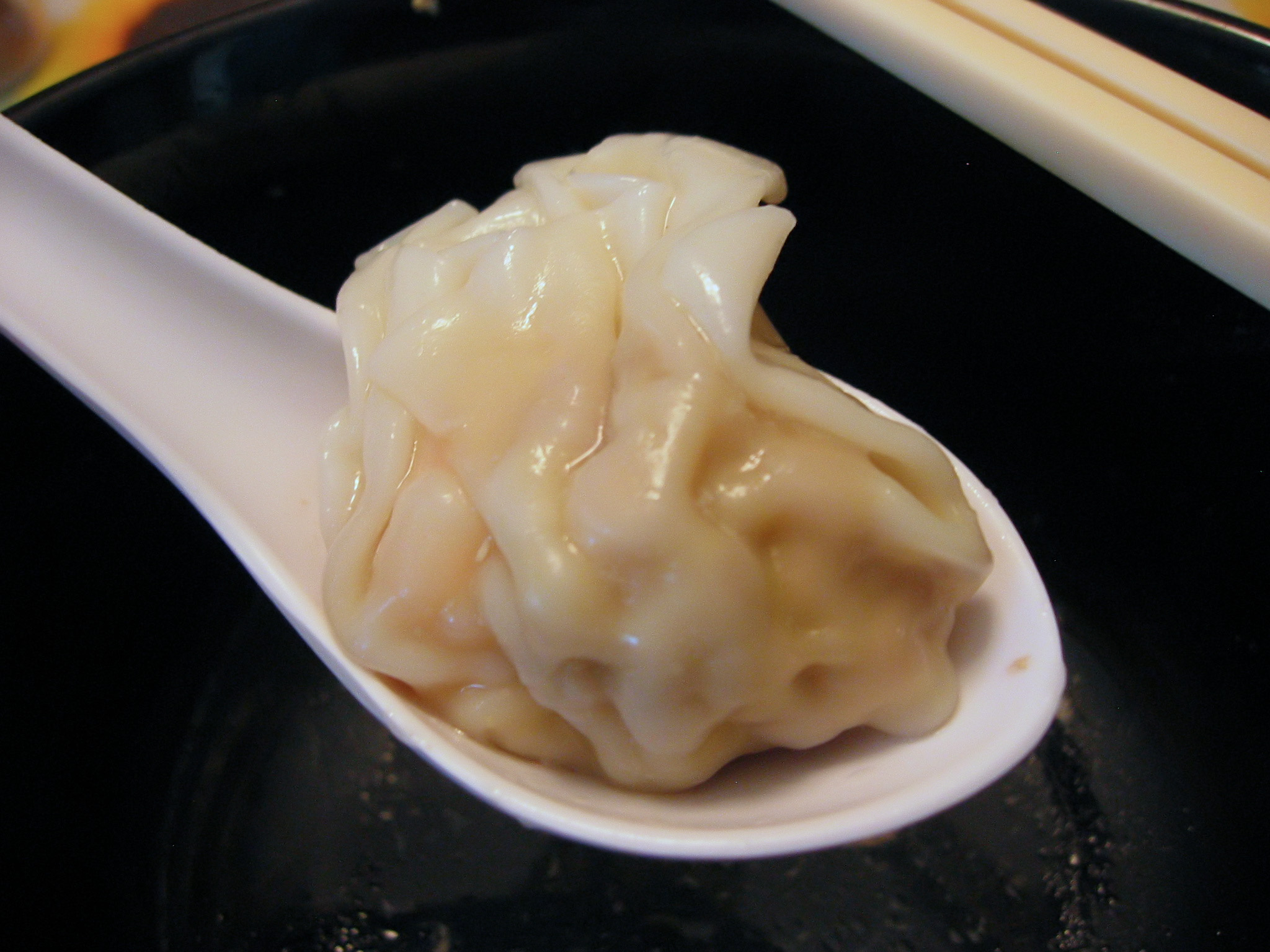
A single cooked wonton

Wontons resemble jiaozi (餃子) dumplings but usually have less filling and are wrapped in a thin 6 × 6 cm yellow square dough wrapper or an isosceles trapezoid and folded into a triangular shape resembling a Chinese gold ingot known as yuanbao (元寶). Jiaozi are wrapped in a slightly thicker circular white dough wrapper with more filling and either flat or pleated edges.

The wonton dough wrapper is sometimes referred to as a wonton skin and becomes transparent after being thoroughly boiled. It takes a shorter time to boil a wonton. The texture is also very smooth.

Wontons are traditionally served in soup, but jiaozi is usually eaten with dipping sauce.

== Preparation and filling ==
Preparing and filling wonton dumplings in Hong Kong

Wontons are made by spreading a square wrapper (a dough skin made of flour, egg, water, and salt) flat in the palm of one's hand, placing a small amount of filling in the center and sealing the wonton into the desired shape by compressing the wrapper's edges together with the fingers. Adhesion may be improved by moistening the wrapper's inner edges, dipping a fingertip into water, and running it across the dry dough to dissolve the extra flour. As part of the sealing process, the air is pressed out of the interior to avoid rupturing the wonton from internal pressure when cooked.

The most common filling is ground pork or chicken and shrimp with a small amount of flour added as a binder. The mixture is seasoned with salt, spices, and often garlic or finely chopped green onion. Factory-made, frozen varieties are sold in supermarkets. Commonly, they are handmade at the point of sale in markets or small restaurants by the proprietor while awaiting customers. In markets, they are sold by the unit without being pre-cooked.

== Shapes and cooking methods ==
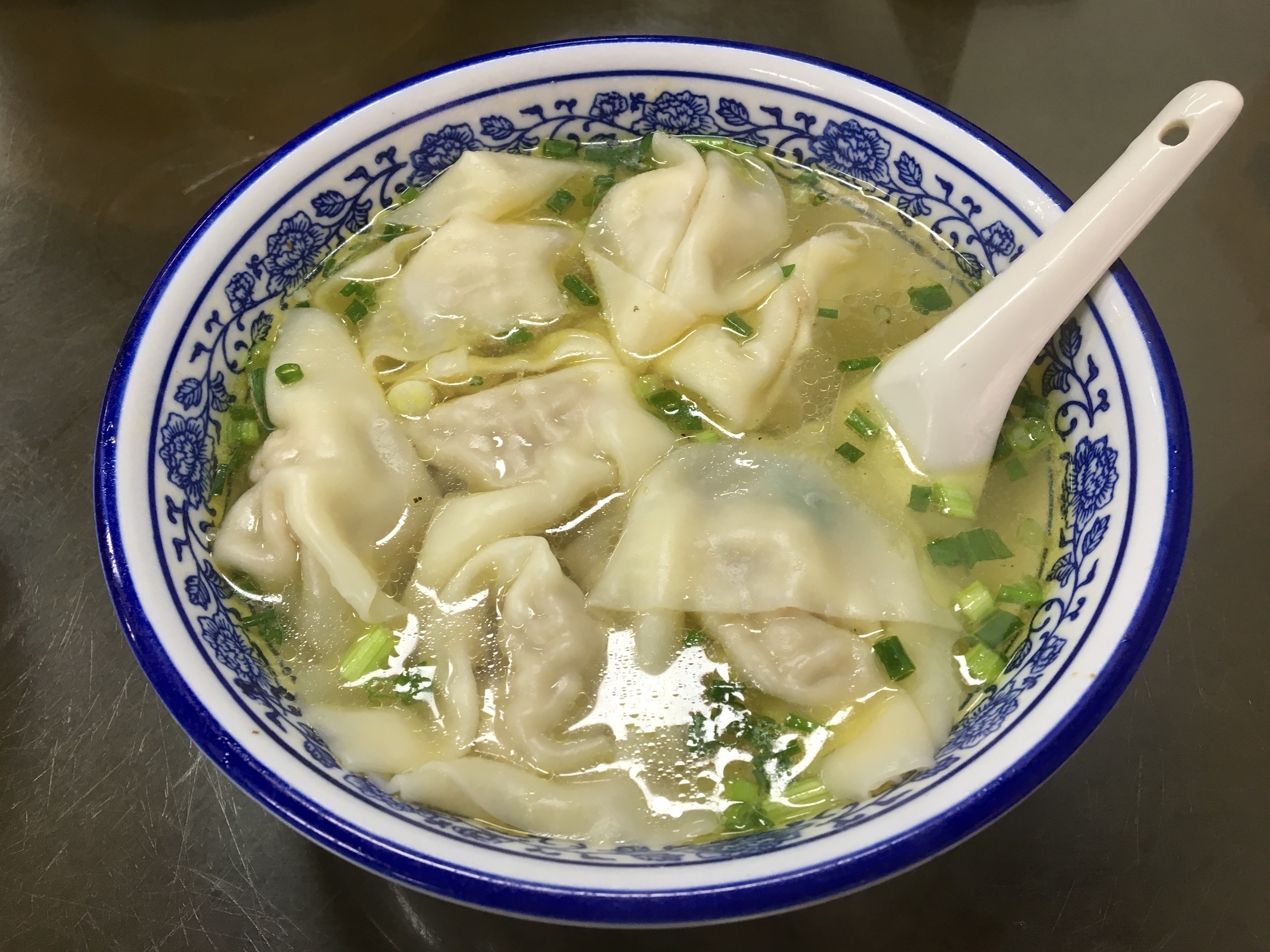
Wonton soup

Wontons are commonly boiled and served in soup or sometimes deep-fried. There are several common regional variations of shape.

The most versatile shape is a simple right triangle, made by folding the square wrapper in half by pulling together two diagonally opposite corners. Its flat profile allows it to be pan-fried like a guotie (pot sticker) in addition to being boiled or deep-fried.

A more globular wonton can be formed by folding all four corners together, resulting in a shape reminiscent of a stereotypical hobo's bindle made by tying all four corners of a cloth together.

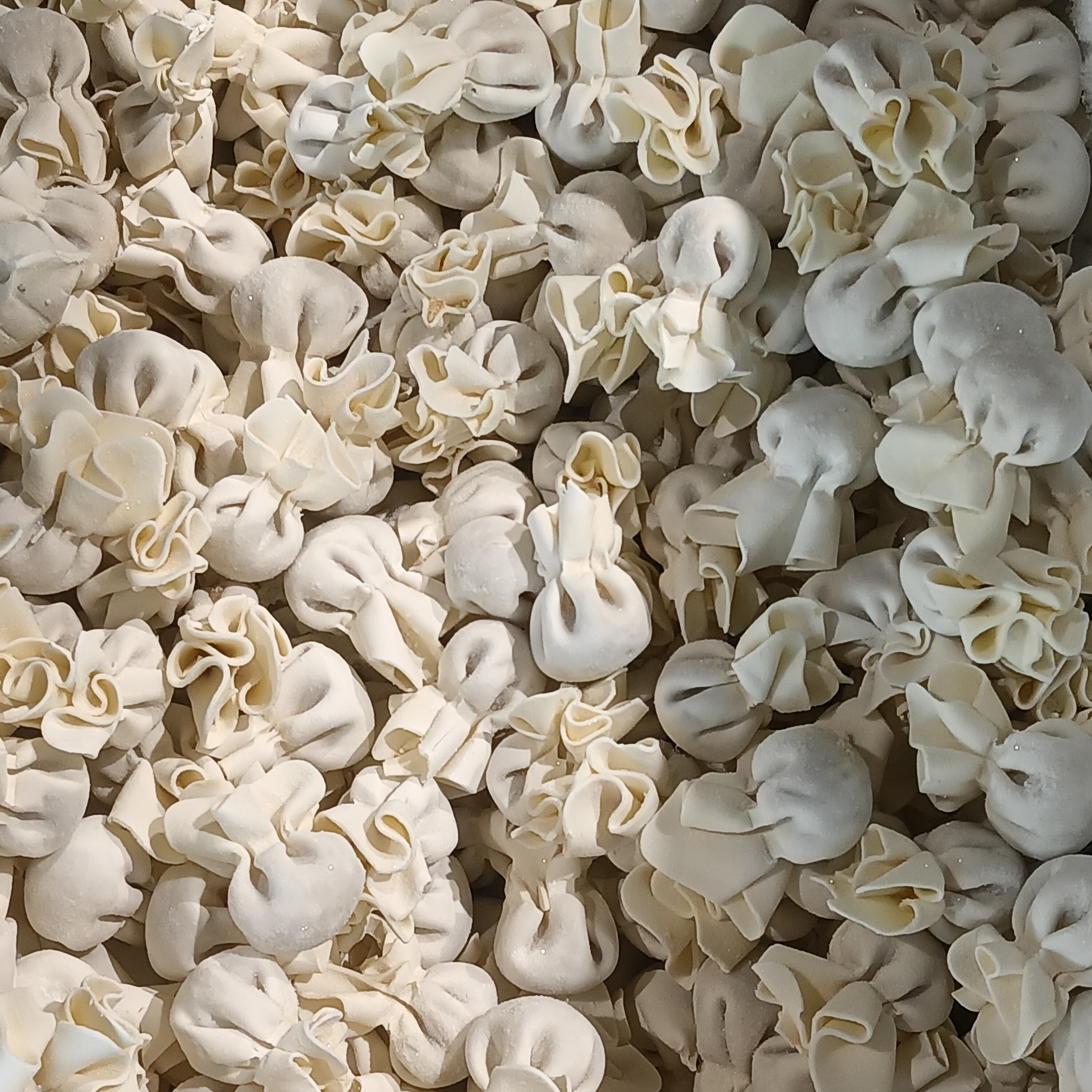
Uncooked pork wontons

A related kind of wonton is made by using the same kind of wrapper but applying only a minute amount of filling (frequently meat) and quickly closing the wrapper-holding hand, sealing the wonton into an unevenly squashed shape. These are called xiao huntun (literally "little wonton") and are invariably served in a soup, often with condiments such as pickles, ginger, sesame oil, and cilantro (coriander leaves).

== Cuisine ==
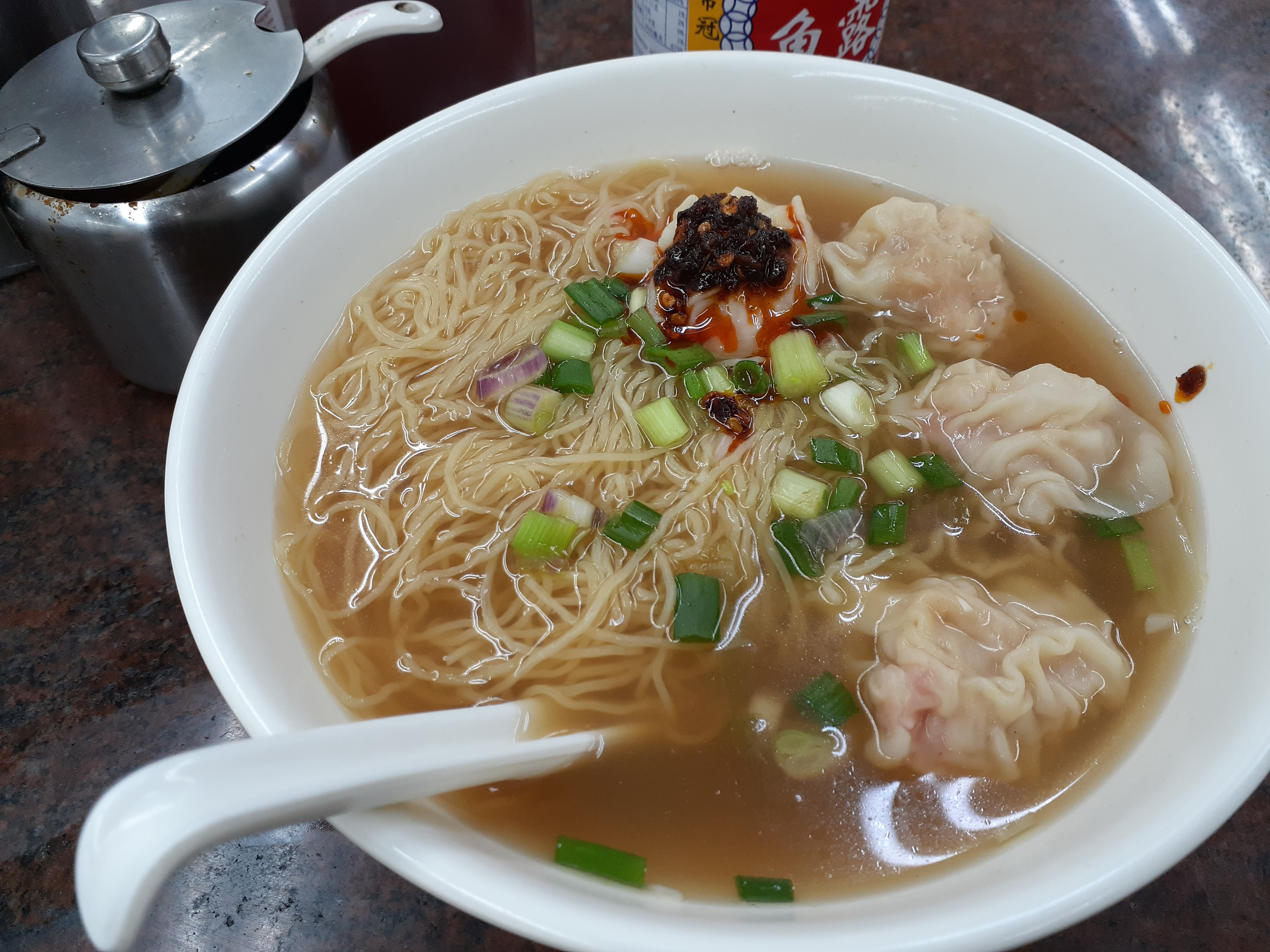
Wonton noodle soup with chili oil, from Hong Kong

Each region of China has its own variations of wonton; examples include Beijing, Sichuan, Hubei, Jiangnan, Jiangxi, Guangdong (Canton), and Fujian.

Dumplings and wontons from the 7th and 8th centuries CE were found in Turpan.

=== Cantonese cuisine ===
In Cantonese cuisine, shrimp-filled wontons within minced pork are most commonly served with thin noodles in a steaming hot soup to make wonton noodles. It may also be consumed with red vinegar. The soup is made from boiling shrimp shells, pork bones, and dried flounder to give it a distinct taste. Wontons are served in a variety of sizes, with the smallest being two wontons and noodles called sai yung.

=== Sichuan cuisine ===
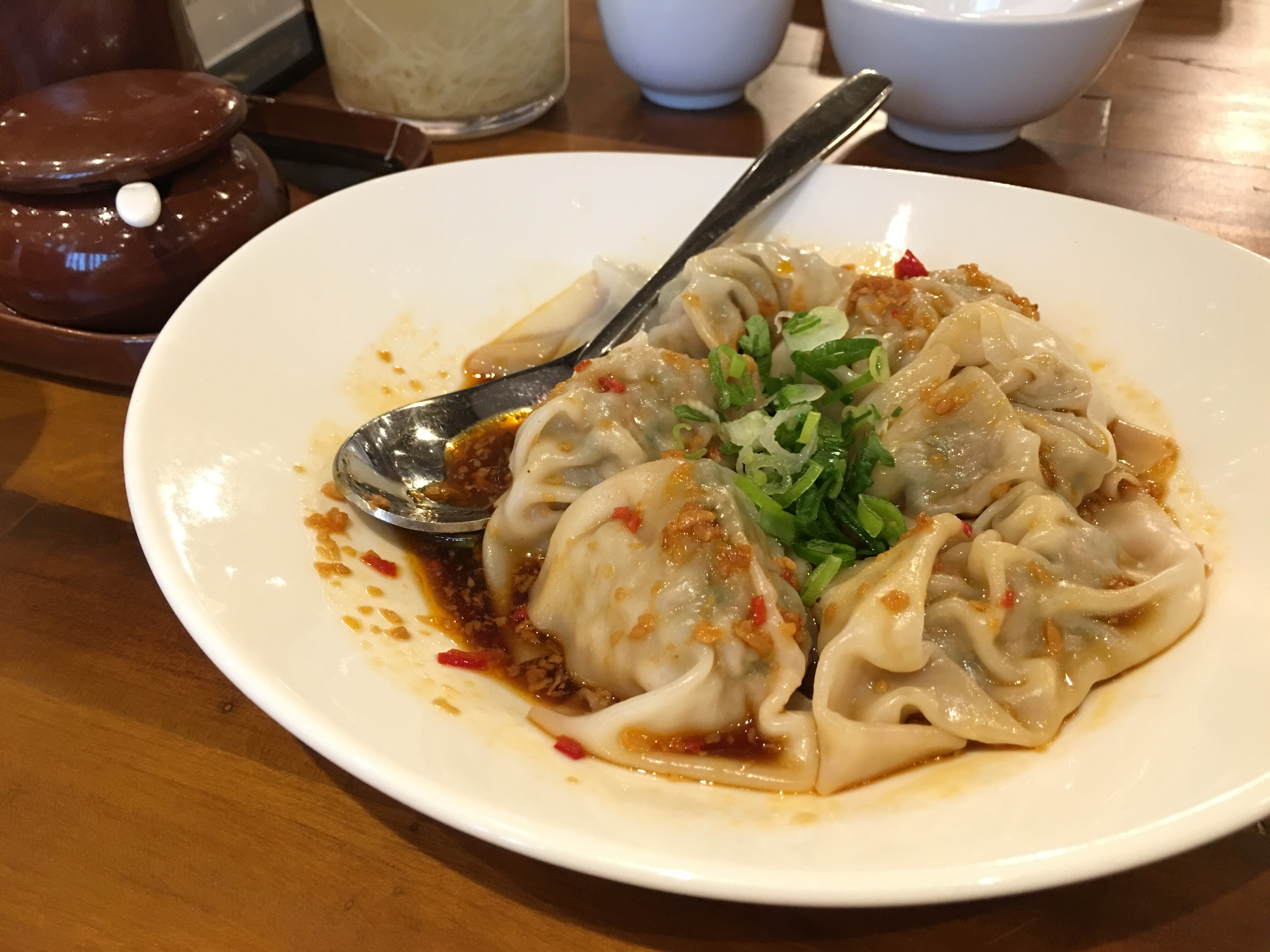
Red oil wontons (红油抄手) from Sichuan cuisine

In Sichuan, semi-pentagonal wontons are known as "folded arms" (Chinese: 抄手; pinyin: chāo shǒu) since after initially folding the wonton skin into a right triangle, each end of the hypotenuse is pressed against the middle of opposite sides, creating an impression of crossed arms/hands. These are often served in a sesame paste and chili oil sauce as a dish called "red oil wonton" (Chinese: 红油抄手; pinyin: hóng yóu chāo shǒu).

=== Yangtze River Delta cuisine ===
The Yangtze River Delta, often known as Jiangnan, Jiangzhe, or Jiangzhehu, is mainly made up of Shanghai, Jiangsu, and Zhejiang with an interconnected system of cuisine. In the Jiangzhe area, they are often called "wonton". Wontons have two types: small wontons and big wontons. Big wontons are a large ingot shape. Generally boiled, the soup will usually be matched with a thin egg omelette, seaweed, mustard greens, and shrimp.

==== Shanghai cuisine ====
In Shanghai and its surrounding Jiangnan, wonton filling is most often made with minced meat (usually pork) and shepherd's purse served in chicken soup; however, Shanghai cuisine makes a clear distinction between small wontons and large wontons.

The former are casually wrapped by closing the palm on a wrapper with a dab of pork filling as if crumpling a sheet of paper. These are popular accompaniments to breakfast or brunch fare. Use of shepherd's purse or other green vegetables is uncommon in the small type. They are similar to those used in Cantonese wonton noodles.

The "large" wontons are carefully wrapped in a shape similar to tortellini, and a single bowl can serve as lunch or a light dinner. They are available with a large variety of fillings; a popular Shanghai fast-food chain offers more than 50 varieties. One popular variety in Shanghai that originated in Suzhou is "three delicacies wonton" (sanxian huntun 三鲜馄饨), which contains pork, shrimp, and beef liver as primary ingredients. They are more similar in size to Sichuan's chaoshou.

==== Ningbo cuisine ====
Ningbo wontons come in two types: steamed wontons and wonton soup. Both are filled with pork and shrimp. These wontons became popular at many Chinese-American restaurants due to their traditional preparation.

=== Outside China ===
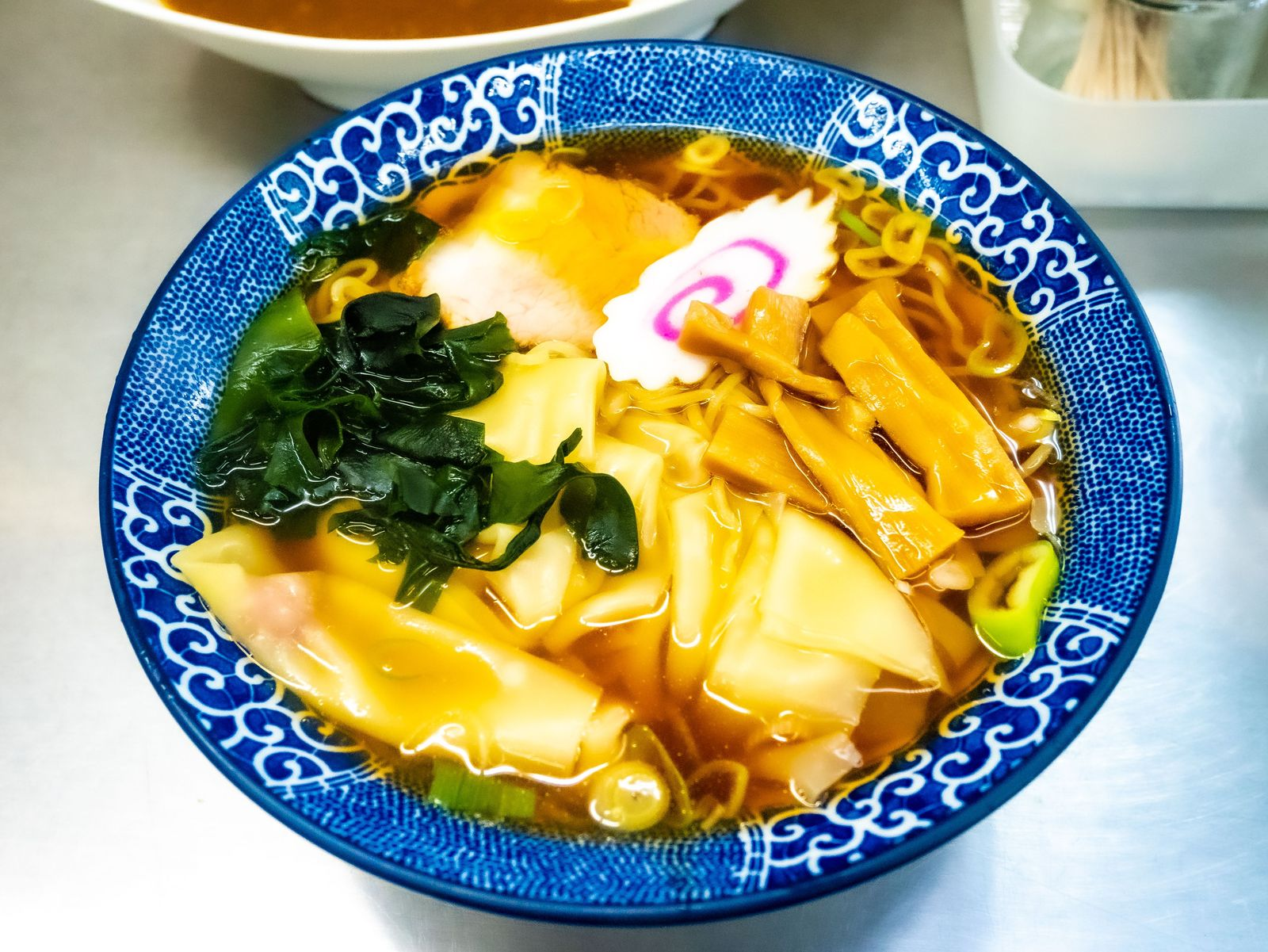
Japanese wonton ramen with menma and narutomaki

In American Chinese cuisine (and occasionally in Canada as well), wontons are served in two ways: in wonton soup (wontons in a clear broth) and as an appetizer called fried wontons. Fried wontons are served with a meat filling (usually pork) and eaten with duck sauce, plum sauce, sweet and sour sauce, or hot mustard. A version of fried wontons filled with cream cheese and crab filling is called crab rangoon. Another version of fried wontons is filled with cream cheese, green onions, soy sauce, and garlic.

Wonton strips, deep-fried strips made from wonton wrappers and served with hot mustard or other dipping sauce, are a common complimentary appetizer in American-style Chinese restaurants.

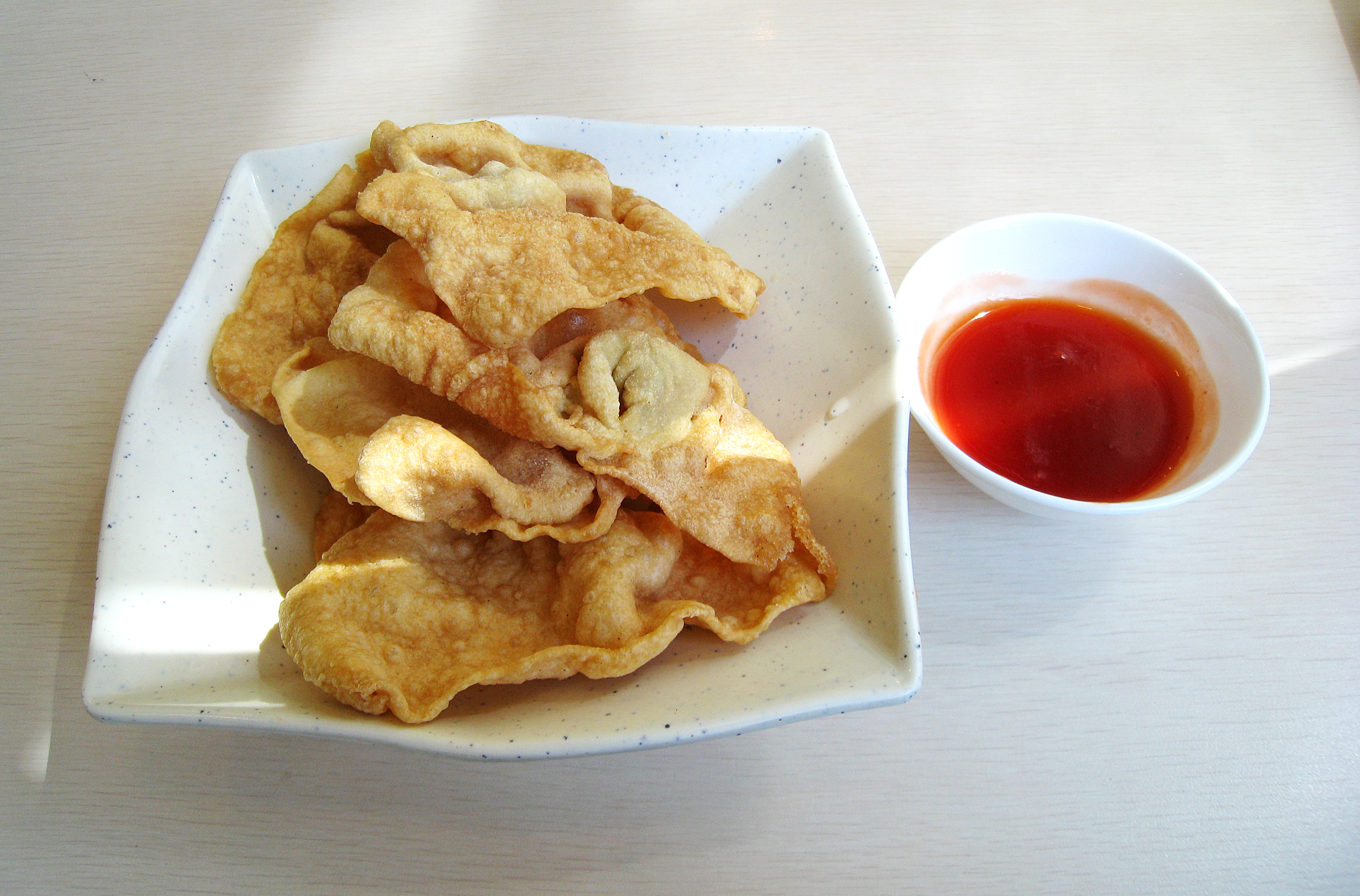
Indonesian pangsit goreng (锦卤馄饨), fried wontons with sweet and sour sauce

In the Philippines, fried wontons are often called pinseques fritos (pinsec frito in the Castilian singular). Pritong pinsek is the Cebuano and Tagalog name. It also figures in the noodle soup pancit Molo, named after the Molo district of Iloilo City. Wonton wrappers in the broth serve as the noodles in the dish.

Wonton is commonly eaten in Singapore as part of the country's hawker culture. It is commonly eaten with noodles and called dry wanton mee.

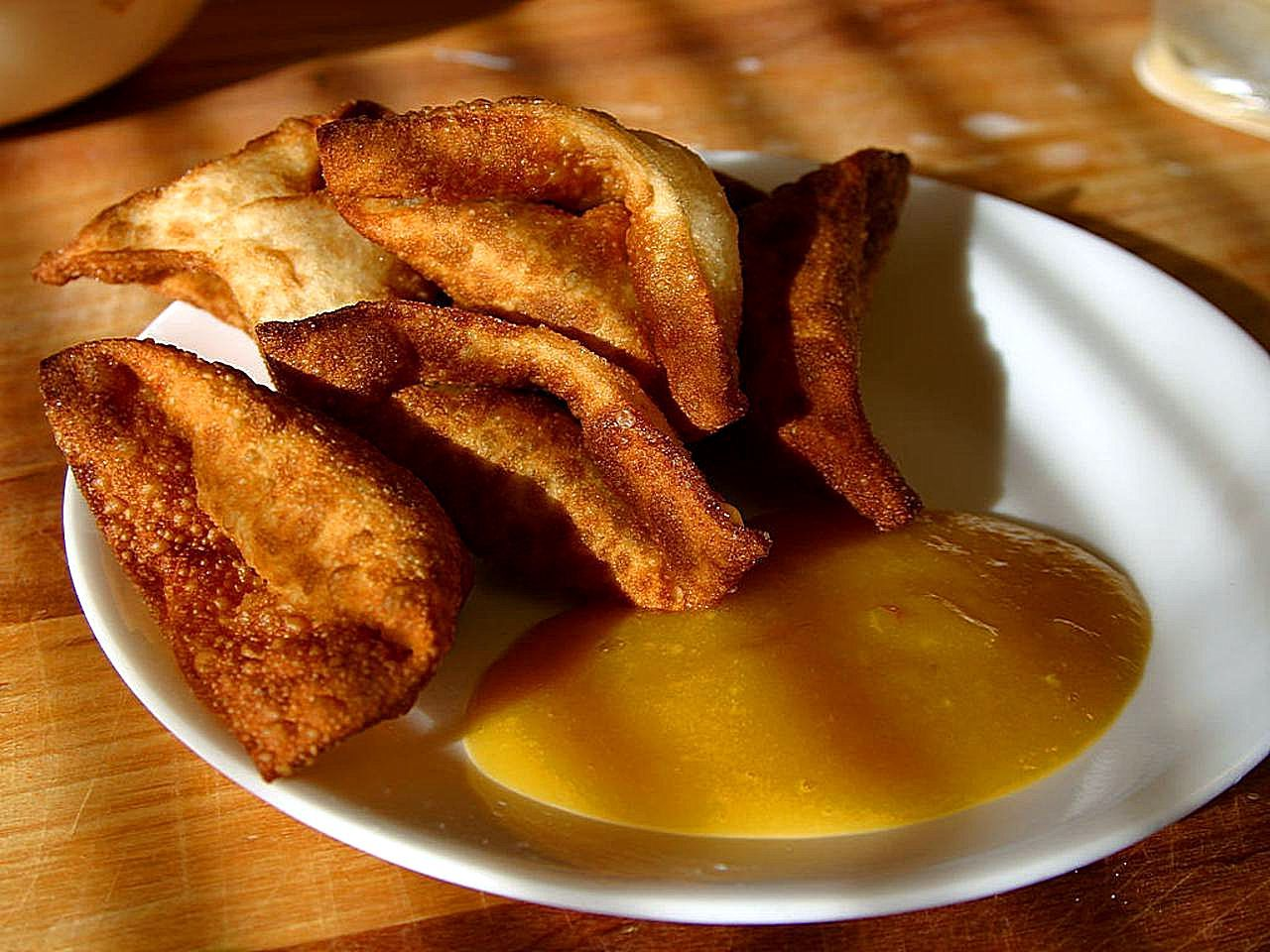
Thai fried wontons with mango sauce

In Indonesian Chinese cuisine, they are called pangsit and are served fried or in soup, usually with Chinese noodles.

In Thailand, wontons are called kiao (เกี๊ยว, pronounced [kía̯w]), from the Teochew pronunciation of 饺 (Mandarin: jiǎo; "dumpling"). Wonton soup is called kiao nam (เกี๊ยวน้ำ, [kía̯w náːm]); the soup is made with chicken stock and the wontons made with a pork filling.

In Vietnamese cuisine, they are known as hoành thánh. They are typically made with a mixture of shrimp and pork, and eaten fried or in soup.

In the Peruvian-Chinese gastronomic fusion called chifa, wontons, called wantán in Peru, can be found fried with meat filling to eat with rice or tallarín saltado, and also in wonton soup or sopa wantán.

In Eastern Europe, mainly Russia (where they are called пельмени pelmenyi) and Estonia (where they are called pelmeenid), wontons are usually filled with minced meat. They are either boiled or fried; many people eat them with vinegar and sour cream.

== Gallery ==
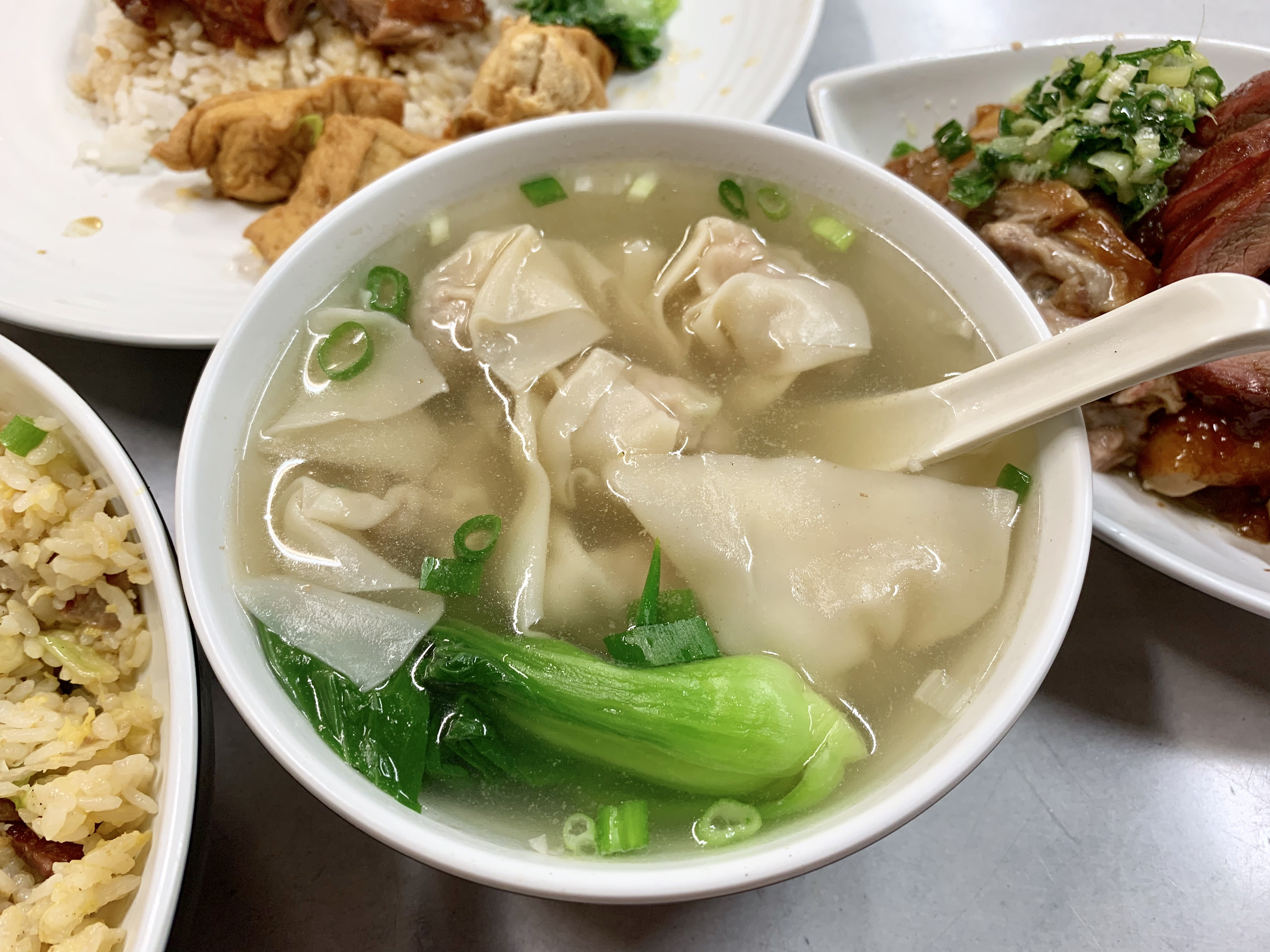
Wonton soup in Taipei

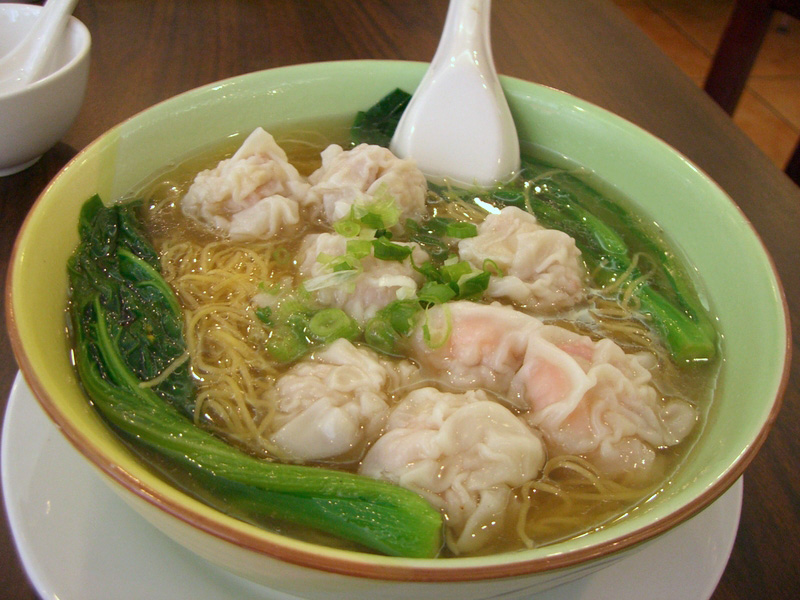
Wonton noodle soup (云吞面)

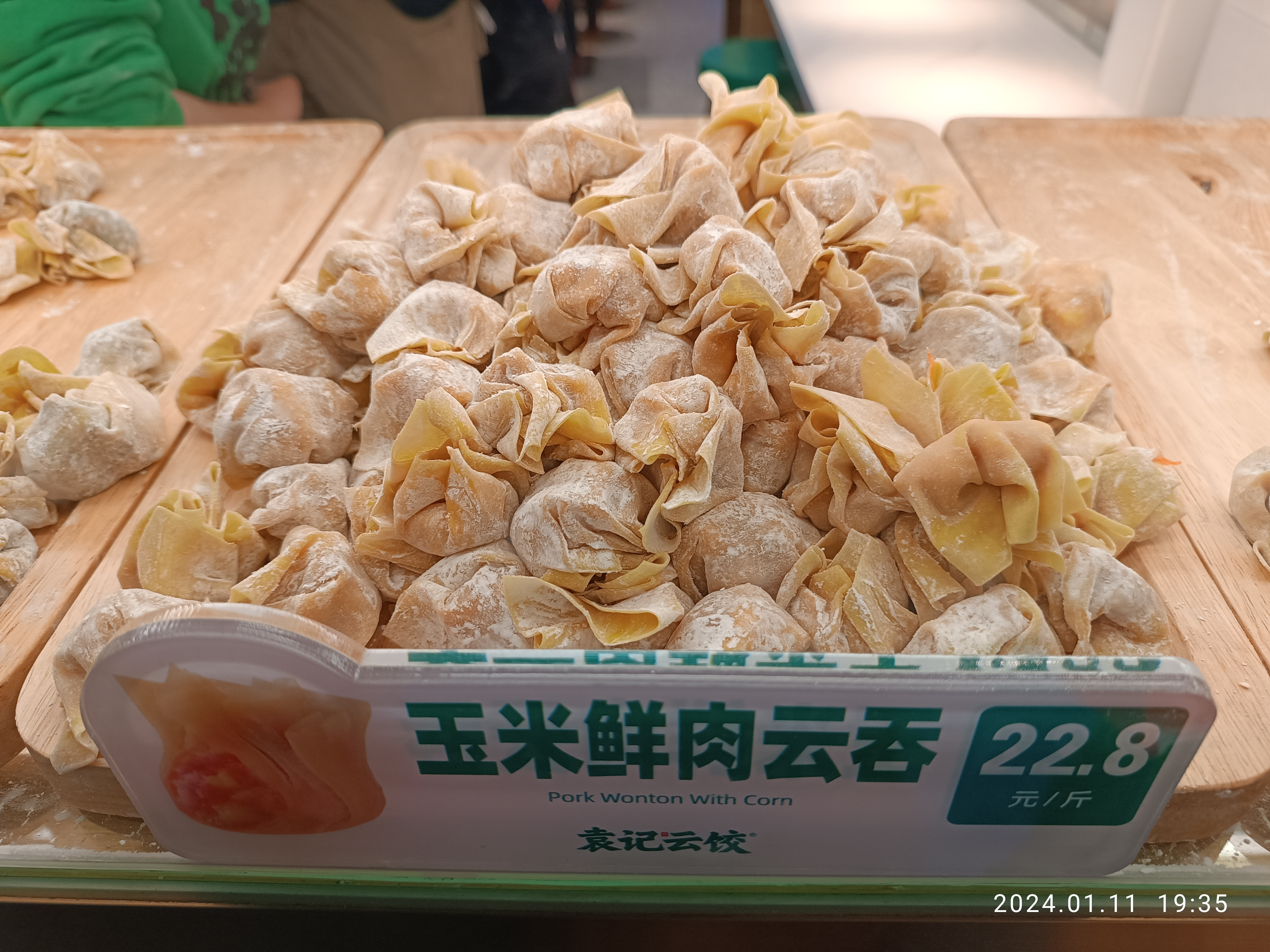
Raw wontons in Shenzhen

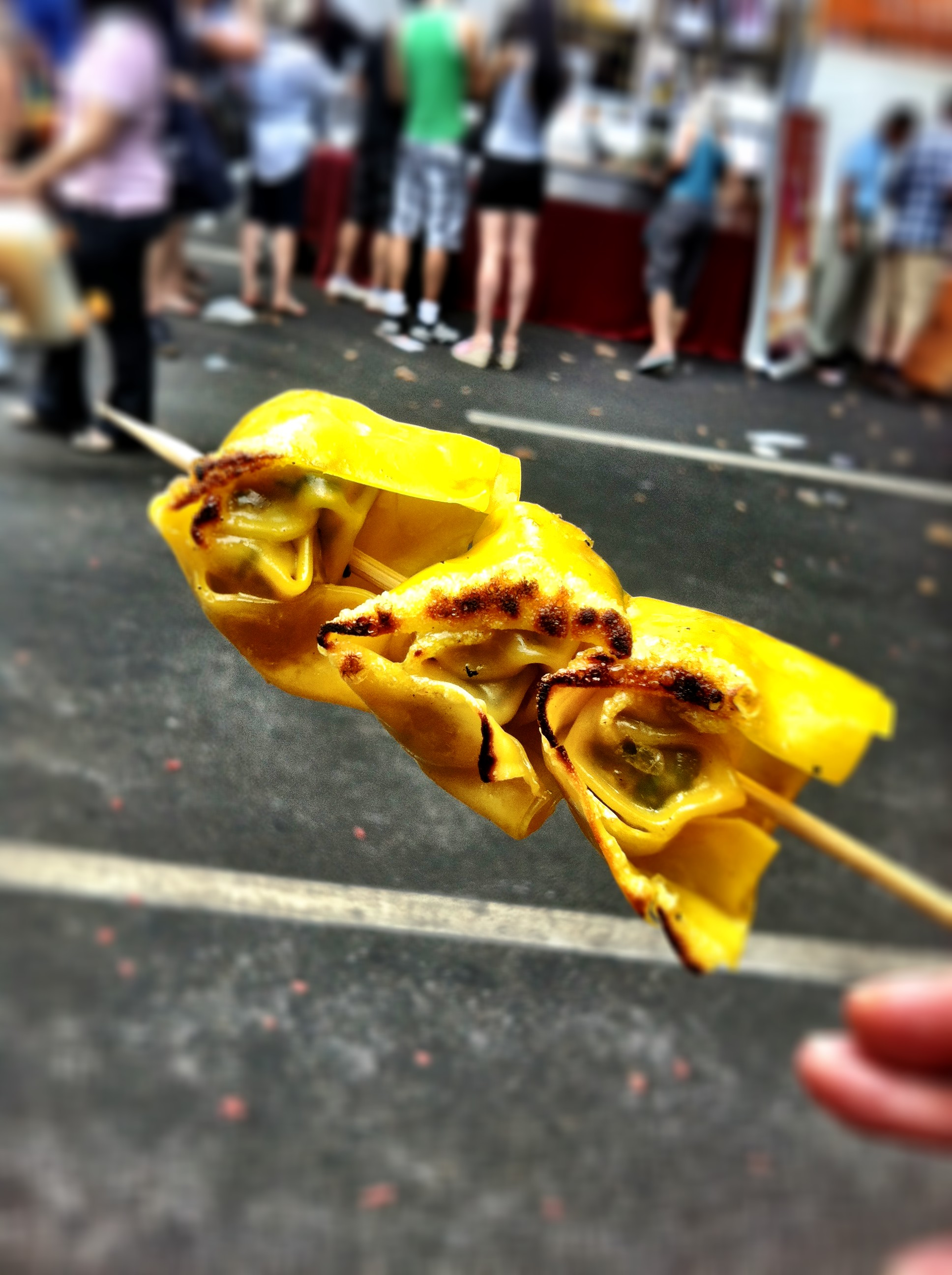
Grilled wonton

== See also ==
- Kalduny
- Kreplach
- List of Chinese dishes
- List of dumplings
- Mandu
- Manti (dumpling)
- Maultasche
- Pierogi
- Ravioli
- Suanla chaoshou
- Tortellini
- Wonton font
- Youtiao
