= The Canon of Supreme Mystery =

1993 English transition of the Chinese book Taixuanjing (2 BCE) by Michael Nylan

- Author: Yang Xiong
- Original title: 太玄 (Taixuanjing)
- Translator: Michael Nylan
- Publisher: State University of New York Press
- Publication date: 1996
- Publication place: Albany
- Pages: 680
- ISBN: 0-7914-1395-0

The Canon of Supreme Mystery is the English language translation of 太玄 (Taixuanjing), the first draft of which was completed in 2 BCE. This English translation of Yang Xiong book by Michael Nylan was published in 1997. Its publication was described as providing a major contribution to the study of development of Chinese thought during the Han dynasty.

Referring to the text as The Mystery, Michael Nylan and Nathan Sivin argue for the importance of Wang's book, being considered as essential to the orthodox search for universal pattern until the thirteenth century when his reputation was ruined, the book left unread and not even mentioned in most modern histories of Chines philosophy.
