= Fayan =

Fayan or Fa Yan may refer to:

- Fayan, a Han dynasty text by Yang Xiong
- Fayan school, one of the Five Houses of Chán Buddhism
