= Taixuanjing =

Confucian divination text (2 BCE)

Chinese name
- Traditional Chinese: 太玄經
- Simplified Chinese: 太玄经
- Hanyu Pinyin: Tàixuánjīng
- Literal meaning: "Classic of Supreme Mystery"
Transcriptions
Standard Mandarin
- Hanyu Pinyin: Tàixuánjīng
- Wade–Giles: Tʻai^{4} hsüan^{2} ching^{1}
Yue: Cantonese
- Jyutping: Taai^{3} jyun^{4} ging^{1}

Korean name
- Hangul: 태현경
Transcriptions
- Revised Romanization: Taehyeongyeong
- McCune–Reischauer: T'aehyŏn'gyŏng

Japanese name
- Hiragana: たいげんきょう
- Kyūjitai: 太玄經
- Shinjitai: 太玄経

The Taixuanjing is a divination guide composed by the Confucian writer Yang Xiong (53 BCE – 18 CE) in the decade prior to the fall of the Western Han dynasty. The first draft of this work was completed in 2 BCE; during the Jin dynasty, an otherwise unknown person named Fan Wang (范望) salvaged the text and wrote a commentary on it, from which our text survives today.

== Content ==
The Taixuanjing is a divinatory text similar to, and inspired by, the I Ching. The I Ching is based on 64 binary hexagrams—characters composed of six horizontal lines, with each line either broken or unbroken. Meanwhile, the Taixuanjing is based on 81 ternary tetragrams—characters composed of four lines, with each line either unbroken, broken once, or broken twice. Like the I Ching, it may be consulted as an oracle by casting yarrow stalks or a six-faced die to generate numbers which define the lines of the tetragram, which is then looked up in the text. A tetragram drawn without moving lines refers to the tetragram description, while a tetragram drawn with moving lines refers to the specific lines.

The monograms are:

- the unbroken line ( ⚊) for heaven (天; tiān),
- once broken line ( ⚋) for earth (地; dì),
- twice broken line ( 𝌀) for man (人; rén).

Numerically the symbols can be counted as ⚊ = 0, ⚋ = 1, 𝌀 = 2, and grouped into sets of four to count from 0 to 80. This is clearly intentional as this passage from chapter 8 of the Taixuanjing points out the principle of carrying and place value.

Chinese

推玄筭：

家 一置一，二置二，三置三。
部 一勿增，二增三，三增六。
州 一勿增，二增九，三增十八。

方 一勿增，二增二十七，三增五十四

English

Push Profound Calculation:

First Part: one sets one, two sets two, three sets three.
Second Part: one doesn't add, two adds three, three adds six.
Third Part: one doesn't add, two adds nine, three adds eighteen.

Fourth Part: one doesn't add, two adds twenty-seven, three adds fifty-four.

== Translation ==
An English translation by Michael Nylan was published in 1993.

- Nylan, Michael (1993). The Canon of Supreme Mystery: A Translation with Commentary of the T'AI HSÜAN CHING. SUNY series in Chinese philosophy and culture. Albany: State University of New York Press. ISBN 0-7914-1395-0.

== Unicode ==
Tai Xuan Jing Symbols
- Range: U+1D300..U+1D35F (96 code points)
- Plane: SMP
- Scripts: Common
- Symbol sets: Tai Xuan Jing
- Assigned: 87 code points
- Unused: 9 reserved code points

Unicode Version History
- 4.0 (2003): 87 (+87)

Unicode documentation
- Code chart ∣ Web page

In the Unicode Standard, the Tai Xuan Jing Symbols block is an extension of the I Ching symbols. Their Chinese aliases most accurately reflect their interpretation; for example, the Chinese alias of code point U+1D300 is "rén", which translates into English as man and yet the English alias is "MONOGRAM FOR EARTH".

=== Block ===
Tai Xuan Jing Symbols^{[1]}^{[2]} Official Unicode Consortium code chart (PDF)
	0	1	2	3	4	5	6	7	8	9	A	B	C	D	E	F
U+1D30x	𝌀	𝌁	𝌂	𝌃	𝌄	𝌅	𝌆	𝌇	𝌈	𝌉	𝌊	𝌋	𝌌	𝌍	𝌎	𝌏
U+1D31x	𝌐	𝌑	𝌒	𝌓	𝌔	𝌕	𝌖	𝌗	𝌘	𝌙	𝌚	𝌛	𝌜	𝌝	𝌞	𝌟
U+1D32x	𝌠	𝌡	𝌢	𝌣	𝌤	𝌥	𝌦	𝌧	𝌨	𝌩	𝌪	𝌫	𝌬	𝌭	𝌮	𝌯
U+1D33x	𝌰	𝌱	𝌲	𝌳	𝌴	𝌵	𝌶	𝌷	𝌸	𝌹	𝌺	𝌻	𝌼	𝌽	𝌾	𝌿
U+1D34x	𝍀	𝍁	𝍂	𝍃	𝍄	𝍅	𝍆	𝍇	𝍈	𝍉	𝍊	𝍋	𝍌	𝍍	𝍎	𝍏
U+1D35x	𝍐	𝍑	𝍒	𝍓	𝍔	𝍕	𝍖									
Notes 1.As of Unicode version 17.0 2.Grey areas indicate non-assigned code points

=== History ===
The following Unicode-related documents record the purpose and process of defining specific characters in the Tai Xuan Jing Symbols block:

Version	Final code points (Note: Proposed code points and characters names may differ from final code points and names)	Count	L2 ID	WG2 ID	Document
4.0	U+1D300..1D356	87	L2/02-089	N2416	Cook, Richard; Everson, Michael; Nylan, Michael (2002-02-11), Proposal to add monogram, digram, and tetragram characters to the UCS
4.0	U+1D300..1D356	87	L2/02-166R2		Moore, Lisa (2002-08-09), "Consensus 91-C4", UTC #91 Minutes, "UTC accepts the 87 tetragram and related characters for encoding at 1D300..1D356."
4.0	U+1D300..1D356	87	L2/05-267	N2998	Proposed annotations for Annex P -- reference N2988, 2005-09-15
4.0	U+1D300..1D356	87	L2/05-260	N2988 (pdf, doc)	Kawabata, Taichi (2005-09-21), Proposal to correct the Character Names for Tai Xuan Jing (U+13D00 ~ U+13D05)
4.0	U+1D300..1D356	87	L2/05-281	N2998R	Proposed annotations for Annex P -- reference N2988, 2005-09-28
4.0	U+1D300..1D356	87		N2953 (pdf, doc)	Umamaheswaran, V. S. (2006-02-16), "M47.15 (Defect in names of Tai Xuan Jing symbols)", Unconfirmed minutes of WG 2 meeting 47, Sophia Antipolis, France; 2005-09-12/15
4.0	U+1D300..1D356	87	L2/06-088		"11.4", Unconfirmed minutes of WG 2 meeting 47, 2006-02-22

== See also ==
- Bigram
- Bagua – (I Ching)
- Ternary numeral system
