= Arroz chaufa =

Peruvian-Chinese fried rice dish

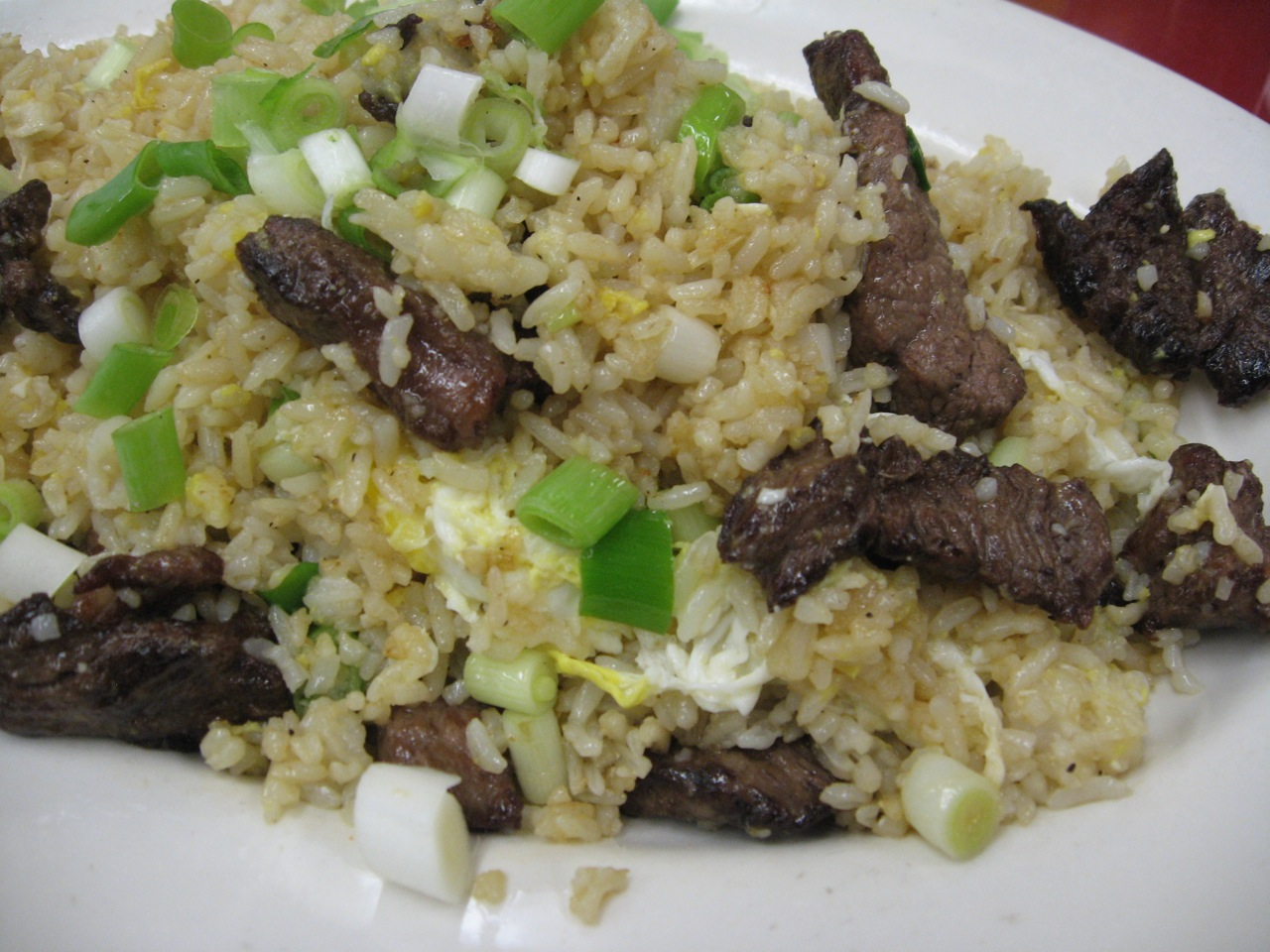
- Arroz chaufa with beef
- Alternative names: Cocina nikkei Comida china Fried rice
- Course: Main course
- Place of origin: Peru
- Associated cuisine: Chifa
- Serving temperature: Hot
- Main ingredients: Rice, egg, soy sauce, Chinese onions
- Ingredients generally used: Chilli peppers
- Variations: Pork, beef, chicken, or shrimp

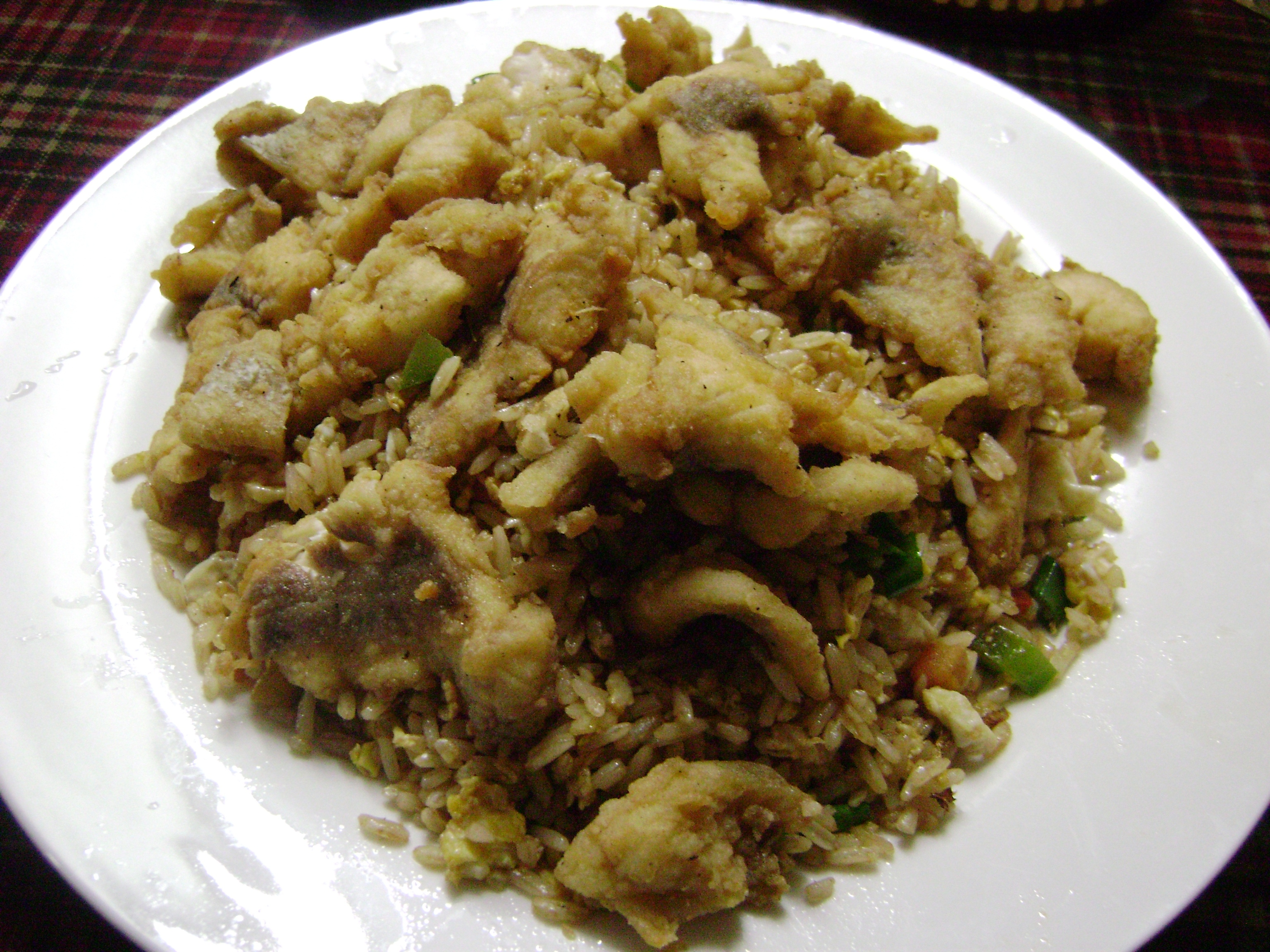
Arroz chaufa with trout

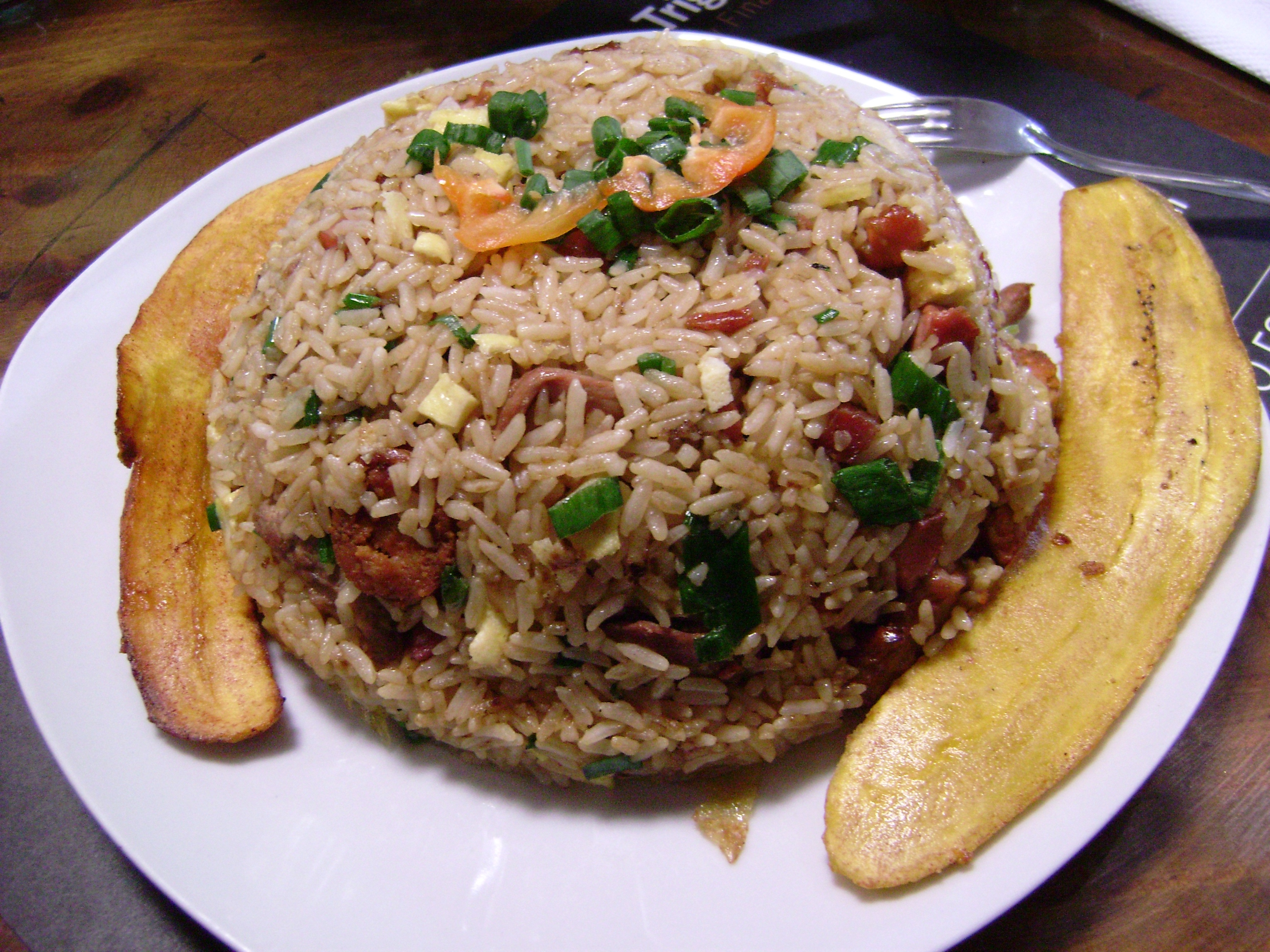
Arroz chaufa with venison, served with a side of fried plantains

Arroz chaufa, also known as chaufa, is a fried rice dish from Peru. It is part of the Chinese Peruvian cuisine, which is called chifa.

Arroz chaufa consists of a mix of fried rice with vegetables, usually including scallions, eggs, and chicken, quickly cooked at high heat, often in a wok with soy sauce and oil. It comes from the Chinese cuisine due to the influx of Chinese immigrants to Peru at the end of the 19th century.

The meats typically used are usually pork, beef, chicken, and shrimp. Dark soy sauce is preferred for use with Peruvian fried rice. A person specialized in the art of making arroz chaufa is known as a chaufero.

== Etymology ==
The word "chaufa" comes from the Chinese word "chaofan" (Traditional Chinese: 炒飯, Simplified Chinese: 炒饭, Pinyin: chǎofàn, Cantonese: Cháau Faahn), literally “(stir) fried rice".

== Variations ==
A variation of arroz chaufa is the chaufa amazónico, a fried rice made with ingredients from the Amazon region in Peru. It typically includes cecina (a salted dried meat) and maduros (sweet plantains).

Besides rice, a common ingredient in most arroz chaufa is the cebollita china (spring onion, Allium fistulosum). It is also possible to adapt the recipe with other grains, like quinoa and wheat. In some regions the rice is replaced with quinoa or pearled wheat while in others, rice is mixed with noodles.

The dish is accompanied by soy sauce and/or an ají-based cream.

Besides this, many other ingredients may be found in the dish:

- Arroz chaufa with chicken
- Arroz chaufa with beef
- Arroz chaufa with pork
- Aeropuerto ("airport"): when the dish includes tallarín saltado, another chifa dish, on the same plate.
- Arroz chaufa "wild"
- Arroz chaufa with duck
- Arroz chaufa with jerky
- Arroz chaufa with seafood
- Arroz chaufa with fish
- Arroz chaufa with alligator or lizard
- Arroz chaufa "special"
- Arroz chaufa "Taypa"

== See also ==
- List of fried rice dishes
