= Chinese Latin American cuisine =

Chinese cuisine with Latin American influences

Chinese Latin American or Chino-Latino cuisine (Spanish: Cocina China Latinoamericana), associated with Asian Latin Americans of Chinese origin, combines elements of Chinese cuisine with other Latin American influences. It is found in Chinese communities and Chinatowns across Latin America, including Peru (where it is known as chifa) and Cuba. It has spread to the United States with the migration of Asian Latin Americans, particularly the migration of Chinese Cubans to New York City.

== Cuba ==
Chinese Cuban cuisine stems from the earliest migration of Chinese migrants to Cuba in the mid-1800s. Due to a labor shortage, close to 125,000 indentured or contract Chinese laborers arrived in Cuba between 1847 and 1874. The laborers or coolies were almost exclusively male, and most worked on sugar plantations alongside enslaved Africans. Tens of thousands of Chinese who survived indenture and remained on the island during the 1870s and 1880s now had more physical, occupational, and even social mobility. They joined gangs of agricultural laborers, grew vegetables in the countryside, peddled goods, and worked as artisans or at unskilled jobs in town.

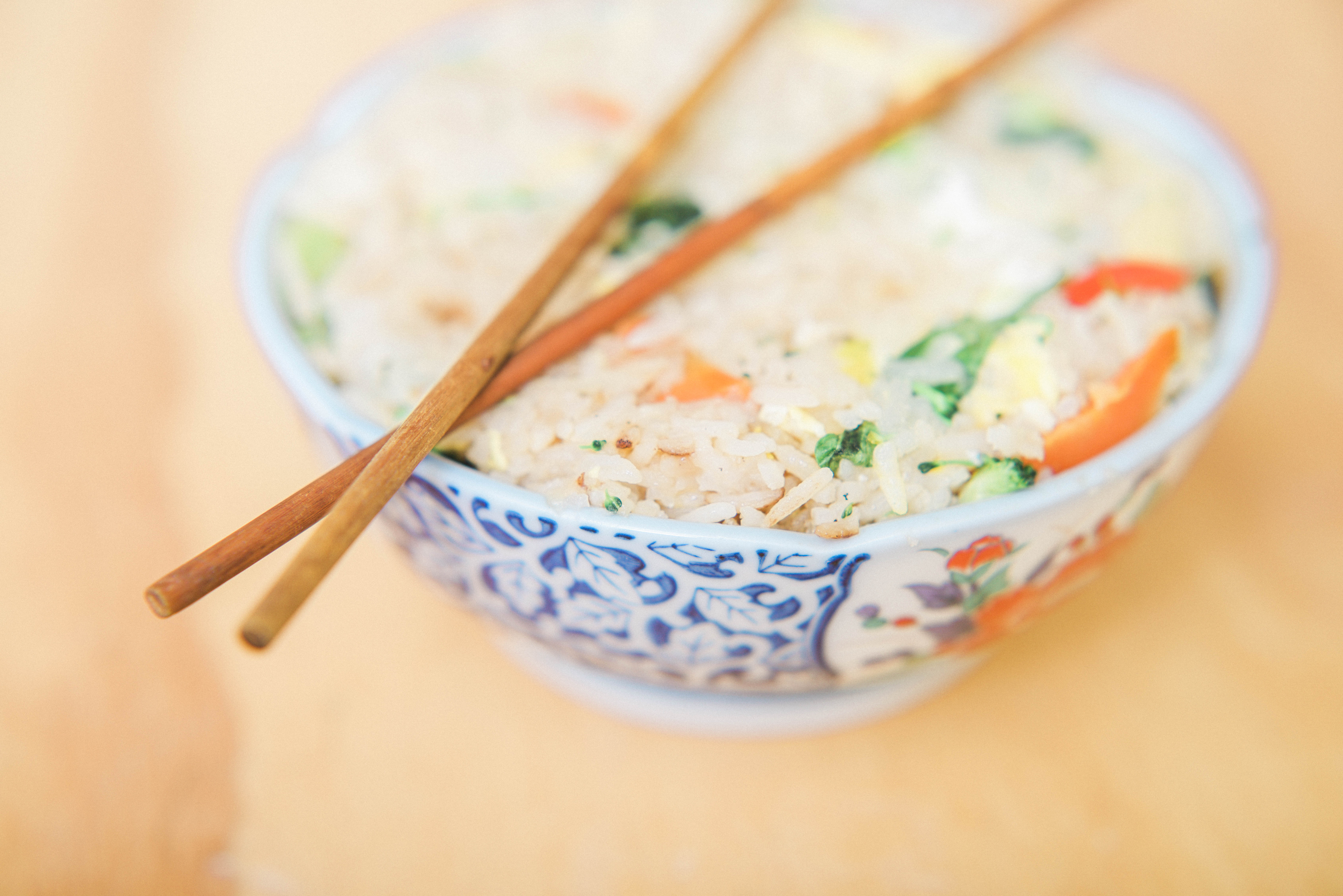
Fried rice

Core aspects of Cuban and Chinese food are similar in their use of white meats such as pork and starches such as rice. The Cuban-Chinese cuisine itself is the cultivation of the food culture of both countries within one restaurant. The Chinese aspect brings dishes such as fried rice, chow mein or shrimp with black bean sauce, while the Cuban aspect brings dishes such as ropa vieja or platanos maduros. Both have ingredients that help distinguish their dishes. In Chinese cooking vegetables such as bok choy, amaranth or broccoli play a big role in the development of popular Chinese dishes such as a stir fry. The Chinese style of cooking also relies a lot on oils, sauces and vinegars; including the most commonly known soy sauce as well as others such as rice vinegar, sesame oil and oyster sauce. The Cuban style uses spices such as garlic, cumin, oregano, bay leaf and cilantro, while also using vegetables like onions, bell peppers and tomatoes.

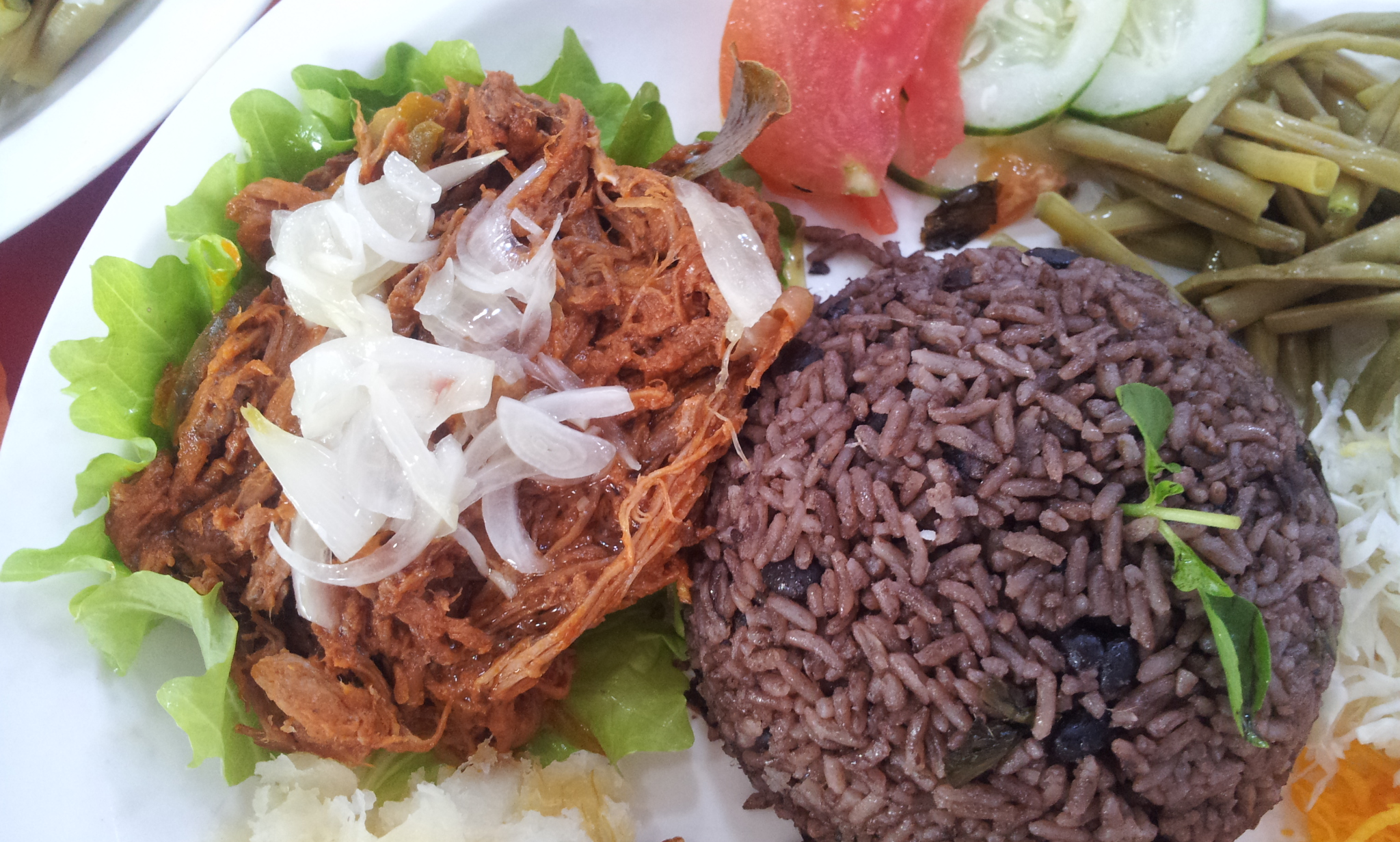
Ropa vieja

One of the oldest and largest Chinatowns is located in Havana, known as Barrio chino de La Habana. Most Chinese merchant communities were forced to relocate after the Cuban Revolution.

== United States ==
=== New York ===
Chino-Latino cuisine in New York City is primarily associated with Chinese Cubans who immigrated following the Cuban Revolution. Chino-Latino restaurants are rarely found in the Chinatowns of the United States. On the contrary, they tend to be concentrated in the Spanish-speaking areas of the five boroughs. The distinct Cuban-Chinese or Latino Chino identity was not found in New York City until the late 1960s and early 1970s when thousands of Chinese remigrated to the United States.

Local conditions, including political and economic instability, have caused the remigration of Chinese to the United States from other parts of Latin America, including Peru, Nicaragua, Venezuela, and Ecuador.

When arriving into the United States, a country in which binary racial categories had now been geared toward the racial segregation of Latinos and Asians which has slowly began to be accepted. Individuals that had previously owned restaurant locals in Cuba's "Barrio Chino de la Habana", initiated the adjustment to personal preference. Once these previous business owners arrived and settled in East Harlem, people began to establish new businesses based on the immersion within foods they have learned when cultured in Cuba, to honor their heritage and establish their economic stability. For incoming immigrants, these restaurants had a homelike feeling due to the authentic qualities and similarities between their settling area and their home country. It had been a minimal aspect of their home country such as, food that allows people to feel comfortable and adapt within their area of settlement. However, just as this concept had emerged in an accepting manner within present day these restaurants are considered to be disappearing this is due to the lack of the Chinese population migrating directly from Cuba in order to keep the tradition upheld. The last Chinese migration directly from Cuba had occurred in 1959, which has caused doubt on how much longer part of the Cuban and Chinese culture can progress. The process of acculturation allowed the younger generations to lose touch of their roots, compared to others who want to stand by where they come in order to keep heritage alive.

In 2023, The New York Times reported that only a "handful" of Chino Latino restaurants remained in New York, compared to over 20 in the past. The same year, a Chino Latino restaurant on the Upper West Side named La Dinastia received a boost in demand from a series of popular TikTok videos.

== See also ==
- Chinese cuisine § Chinese cuisines outside China
- Overseas Chinese
- Latin American cuisine § Asian influence
- Caribbean Chinese cuisine
