= Fayan (book) =

Philosophy text by Yang Xiong (c. 9 AD)

- Author: Yang Xiong
- Original title: 法言
- Language: Classical Chinese
- Genre: Philosophy
- Publication date: c. AD 9
- Publication place: China

Fayan
- Chinese: 法言
- Literal meaning: Model sayings
Transcriptions
Standard Mandarin
- Hanyu Pinyin: Fǎyán
- Gwoyeu Romatzyh: Faa Yan
- Wade–Giles: Fa Yen
- IPA: [fà jɛ̌n]
Yue: Cantonese
- Yale Romanization: Faat Yìhn
- Jyutping: Faat3 jin4
- IPA: [fat̚˧ jin˩]
Southern Min
- Tâi-lô: Huat Giân
Middle Chinese
- Middle Chinese: Pjop ngjon

Cover of a printed edition of Fayan

The Fayan, also known in English as the Model Sayings or Exemplary Figures, is a Classical Chinese text by the Han dynasty writer and poet Yang Xiong that was completed c. AD 9. It comprises a collection of dialogues and aphorisms in which Yang gives responses to a wide variety of questions relating to philosophy, politics, literature, ethics, and scholarship.

== Contents ==
The text of the Fayan is divided into 13 chapters. It is presented in the form of dialogues between Yang and an anonymous interlocutor, whose questions which Yang responds with terse, authoritative pronouncements that rely more on wit and puns than on logical exposition. The style is deliberately modeled on the Analects, and was intended to counter the ideas of the "syncretic" philosophical school, which Yang believed was contrary to the orthodox teachings of Confucianism and the ancient Chinese sages.

== Translations ==
- 法言 (in Japanese), translated by Suzuki, Yoshikazu, Tokyo: Meitoku shuppansha, 1972
- "Yang Hsiungs Fa-yen (Worte Strenger Ermahnung)" [Yang Xiong's Fayan (Words of Strict Admonition)], Sinologische Beitrage [Sinological contributions] (in German), vol. 4, pt. 1, translated by von Zach, Erwin, 1939
- Exemplary Figures: Fayan 法言, translated by Nylan, Michael, Seattle: University of Washington Press, 2013, ISBN 978-0-295-99289-1
- Yang Xiong, Philosophy of the Fa Yan: A Confucian Hermit in the Han Imperial Court, translated by Bullock, Jeffrey S., Mountain Mind Press, 2011 – via Chinese Text Project
