= Chaoshou =

Spicy sauce over steamed, meat-filled dumplings

Suanla chaoshou
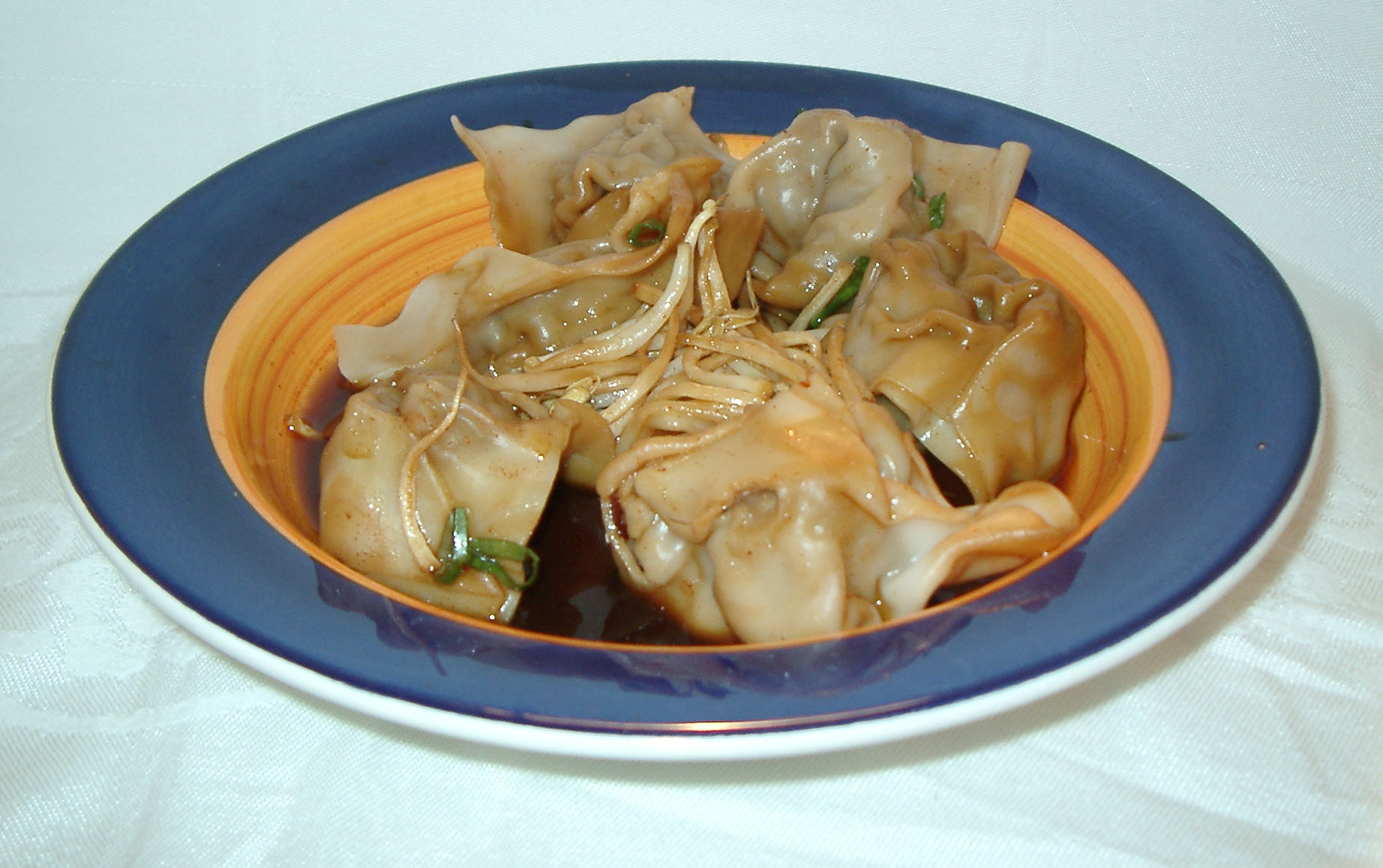
- Type: Dumpling
- Place of origin: China
- Region or state: Sichuan
- Main ingredients: Dough, meat, spicy sauce

Chaoshou
- Chinese: 酸辣抄手
Transcriptions
Standard Mandarin
- Hanyu Pinyin: suānlà chāoshǒu

Suanla chaoshou is a dish of Sichuan cuisine that consists of a spicy sauce over boiled, meat-filled dumplings. Suanla means "hot and sour," and chaoshou is what these particular large wontons are called in the Chinese province of Sichuan.

Chao shou translates literally as "folded hands"; in the Sichuanese dialects this refers to a style of dumpling whose square wrapper is folded into two points, one crossed over the other. According to Peter Hessler (Beijing correspondent for The New Yorker and former Peace Corps teacher), "In most parts of Sichuan, you can walk into a restaurant and order chaoshou without making a sound. Cross your arms and they will understand exactly what you want." One native speaker claims the Sichuan-only name for these dumplings may have originated at one time by a dialectic transposition, i.e. "chao shou" was originally "shou chao", meaning "hand-folded".

== In the United States ==
Variations on this dish are available in many Chinese restaurants in the United States, with the name on the English menu being "Won Ton with Spice Sauce" or similar.

From 1981 to December 2022, Mary Chung's restaurant (鍾園川菜館, Pinyin: Zhōngyuán Chuāncàiguǎn) in Cambridge, Massachusetts, served a dish called Suan La Chow Show, which were dumplings in a spicy soy ginger sauce on top of a bed of raw mung bean sprouts. This popular dish is different from the suan la chao shou described by Fuchsia Dunlop, who studied at the Sichuan Institute of Higher Cuisine in Chengdu. Although somewhat similar, Dunlop's recipe includes a substantial amount of black vinegar in the sauce, making it much more sour.

A local restaurant reviewer noted the first version of the dish was introduced to Cambridge as Shanghai street food by a restaurant called Colleen's Chinese Cuisine, owned by Colleen Fong, where Mary Chung’s husband worked as a chef in the 1970s. At one point, Colleen taught a cooking class at MIT. Her recipe was posted to Usenet in 1990 with further clarification a few years later. Other Chinese restaurants around Cambridge, Massachusetts, serve this version of the dish, and it appears to be a somewhat popular local variation. Mary Chung's version of Suan La Chow Show was featured by the Gentleman Gourmand on the Boston episode of The Hungry Detective television show.

== See also ==
- Wonton
