= Chifa =

Chinese Cantonese and Peruvian fusion culinary tradition

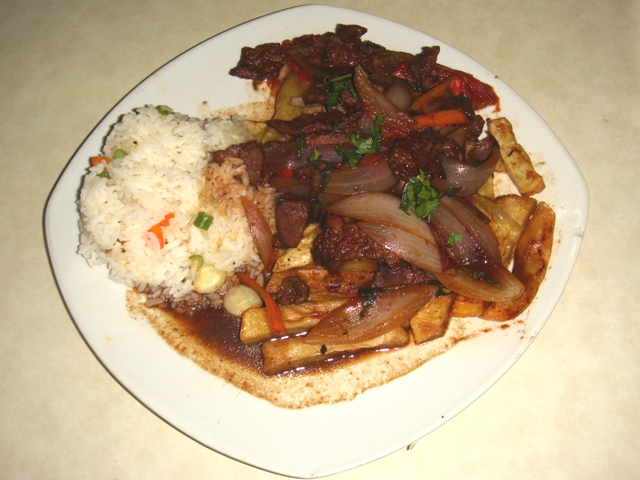
Lomo saltado originated as a chifa dish and became part of mainstream cuisine.

Chifa is a Chinese Peruvian culinary tradition based on Cantonese elements fused with traditional Peruvian ingredients and traditions. The term is also used to refer to restaurants that serve the chifa cuisine.

Chifa has spread from Peru to neighboring countries including Ecuador, and Chile.

== Etymology ==
The majority of Chinese Peruvians have origins in the southern Chinese province of Guangdong, where Cantonese is spoken. The Comisión Lexicografía de la Academia Peruana (CLAP) proposed that the word chifa is from Cantonese 食飯喇 (Jyutping: sik^{9} faan^{6} laa^{3}), lit "to eat cooked rice" ("comer arroz cocido") but usually meant "Time to eat [meal]". The term came to prominence in Lima in the 1930s, when Limeños heard Chinese people using the expression "chifan" as a call to eat in the restaurants they ran.

A similar loanword, chaufa (a chifa fried rice dish), comes from the Cantonese 炒飯 or chaofan (Jyutping: caau^{3} faan^{6}), meaning "fried rice".

== History ==
In the late 19th and early 20th centuries, Chinese immigrants came to Peru as workers. They came mainly from the southern Chinese province of Guangdong, particularly the capital city of Guangzhou. For the most part, they settled on the coast of Peru and in the capital city of Lima.

There are different accounts on the development of chifa restaurants in Lima, such as the following:

Why is the Chinatown of Lima near the central market called Capon? Because on Ucayali Street pigs, bulls, sheep and goats were fattened to be made more appetizing. Near Capon Street there was a piece of land known as Otaiza, which was rented by a group of Chinese free of the [indenturement] contract, doing what they best knew how to do: cooking and merchanting (...) Capon turned into the birthplace of Chinese food and of the first Peruvian chifas, a blessing from the sky. Soon all of Lima comes to eat at Ton Kin Sen, to Thon Po, to Men Yut, and to San Joy Lao where there was dancing to a live orchestra. Chinese restaurants became known as Chifa. For some this word was derived from the Chinese ni chi fan or "Have you eaten yet". Soon later would come the dish chau fan (fried rice), and finally, chaufa, a dish that comes with almost every chifa meal.
– León, R., 2007 pp.134-136.

== Cuisine ==
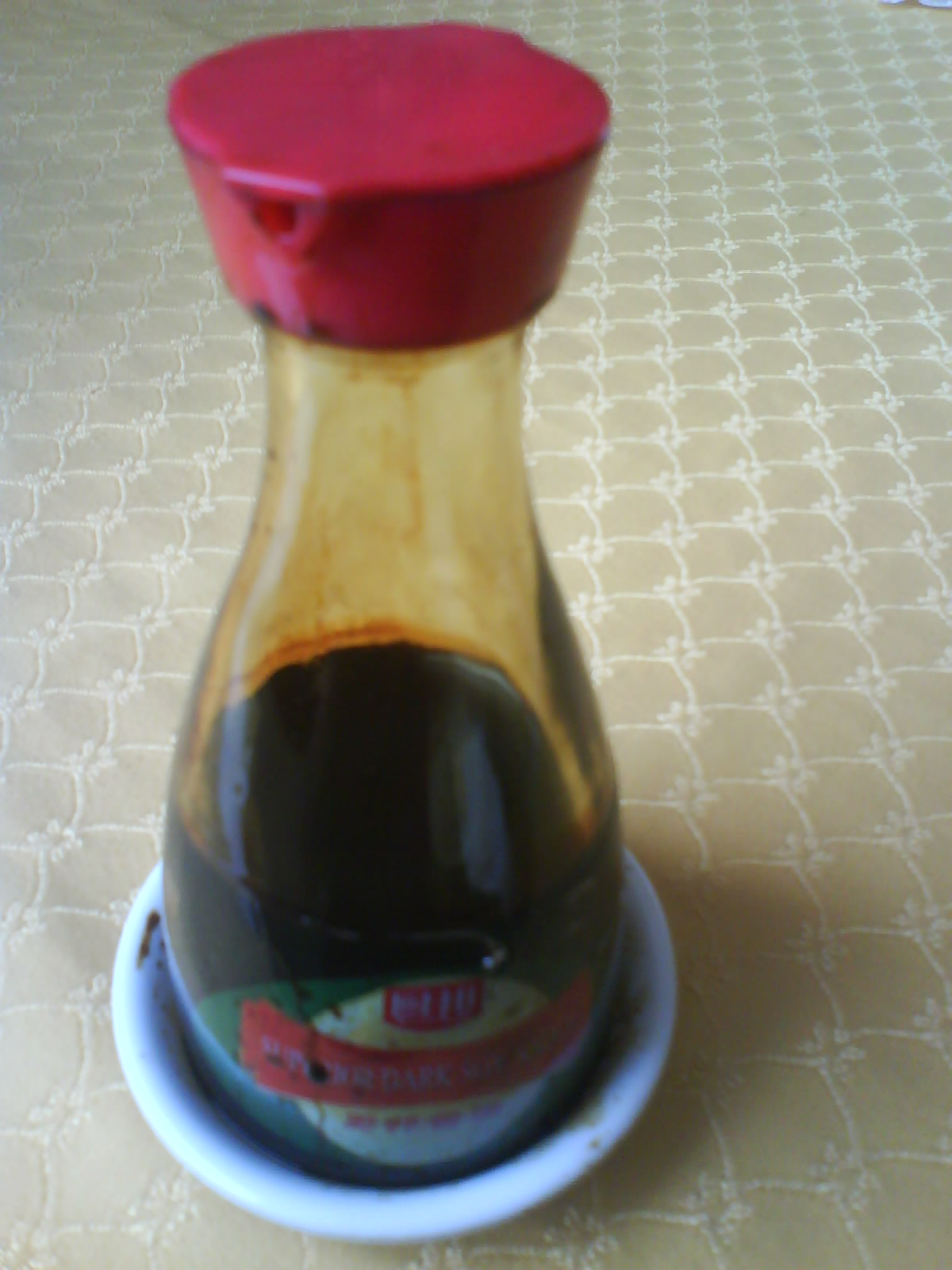
Soy sauce, called sillao in Peru, is an important ingredient

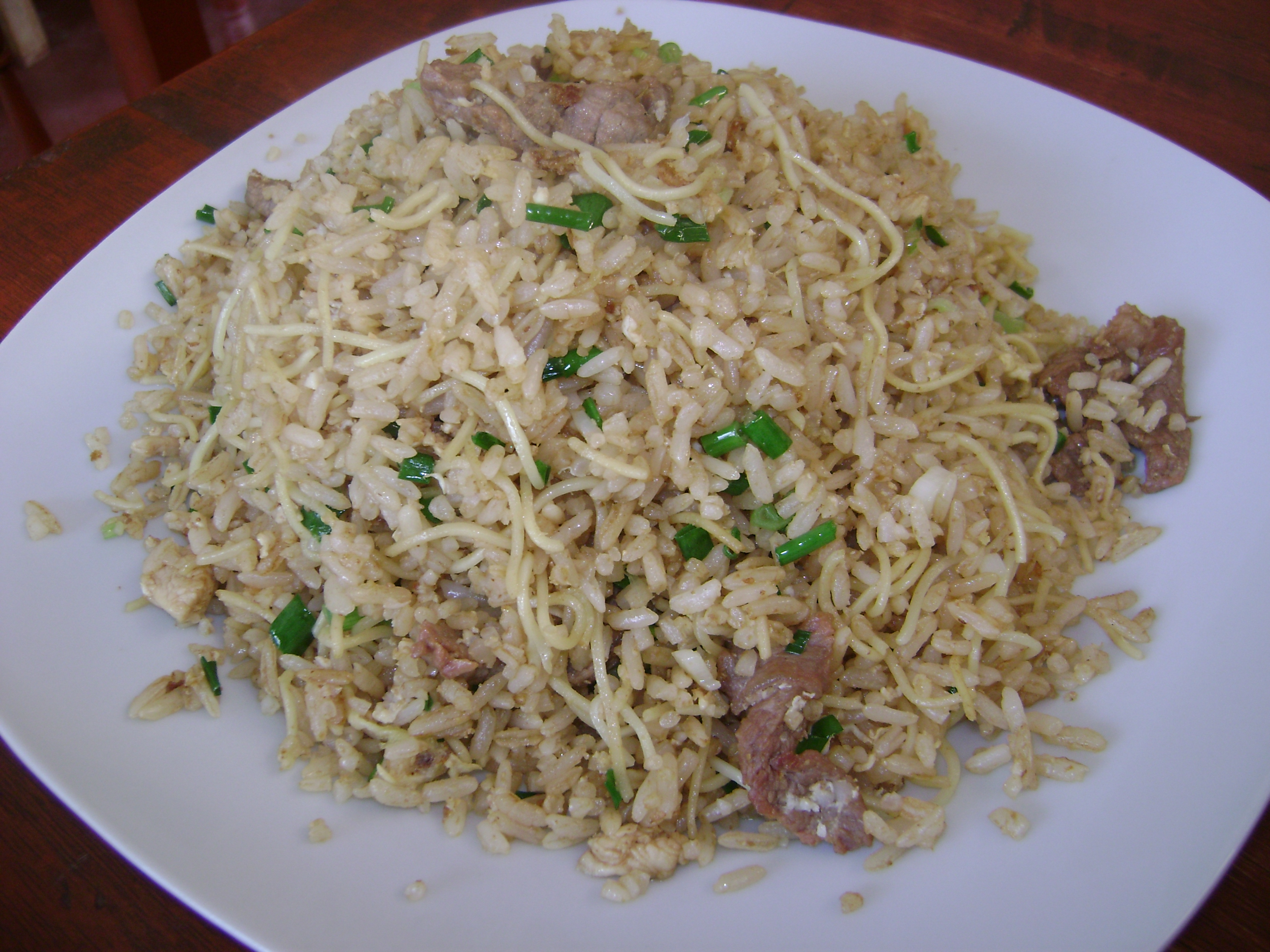
Arroz chaufa, in this case with beef and bean sprouts

Peruvian chifa is distinct, influenced by Peruvian cuisine. Like most Chinese food elsewhere, rice, meat, noodles and vegetables are staples in chifa. Chifa is eaten by all socioeconomic groups, with some directed at those with more disposable income, and chifas de barrio at those with less. Lima had over 6,000 chifa restaurants in 2007.

=== Chifa dishes ===
| Name | Image | Description |
|---|---|---|
| Aeropuerto | | A mixture of arroz chaufa and tallarín saltado |
| Arroz chaufa | | Cantonese-Peruvian style fried rice (white rice, soy sauce, scallions, fried egg, and meat such as chicken or pork) |
| Chicharrón de pollo | | Fried simmered chicken cubes served with spiced lemon juice |
| Kam Lu Wantan | | Wontons stir fried with sweet and sour sauce, vegetables and meat |
| Lomo saltado | | Stir-fried marinated sirloin strips with onions, tomatoes and peppers and served with french fries and rice. |
| Pollo Chi jau kai | | Chicken with chu-hou sauce |
| Pollo con tausi | | Seasoned chicken with a dark broth |
| Pollo enrollado | | Chicken rolled into fried crust |
| Pollo Tipa Kay | | Chicken with Sweet and Sour sauce. |
| Sopa estilo chifa | | Chinese-style chicken soup |
| Sopa Fu chi fu | | Egg drop soup |
| Sopa wantan | | Cantonese-Peruvian style wonton soup |
| Tallarin saltado | | Cantonese-Peruvian style chow mein |
| Taypa a la plancha | | Stir fry of beef, pork, chicken, fried tofu puffs, seafood, vegetables |
| Wantan frito | | Fried wonton |

== Chifa in other countries ==
Since at least the 1970s, Chinese immigrants have opened chifa restaurants in Ecuador, Bolivia, Chile, and Spain.

== See also ==
- Chinese cuisine
- Peruvian cuisine
- Nikkei cuisine
- Chinese Peruvians
- Chinatown of Lima
- Chinese Latin American cuisine
