= Tallarín saltado =

Peruvian dish

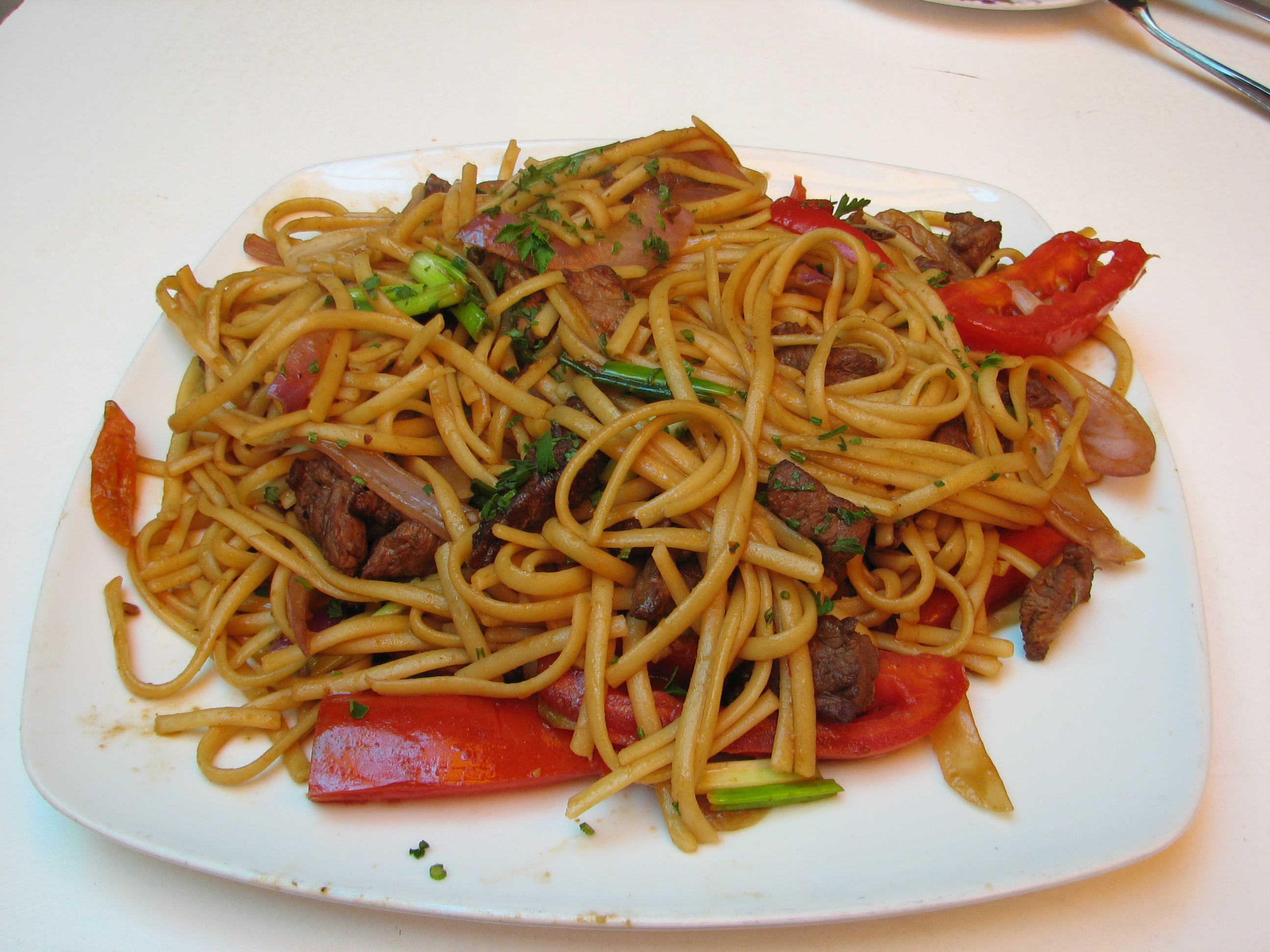
- Tallarín saltado
- Place of origin: Peru

Tallarín saltado is a Peruvian dish that is found in chifa cuisine. The name of the dish comes from the word "stir-fry" (saltear), in which the food is fried over high heat in small pieces. To make this dish, some cooked noodles, vegetables and portions of meat are sautéed to taste. The seasoning or dressing comes from Chinese spices and sesame oil.

Tallarín saltado represents a localized Peruvian variation of chifa cuisine and bears a resemblance to the Chinese stir-fried noodle dishes known internationally as chow mein.

When tallarín saltado is served together with arroz chaufa on a single dish, the combination is colloquially referred to as "aeropuerto", which translates to "airport" in English.
