= Yang Xiong (author) =

Chinese scholar and poet (53 BCE – 18 CE)

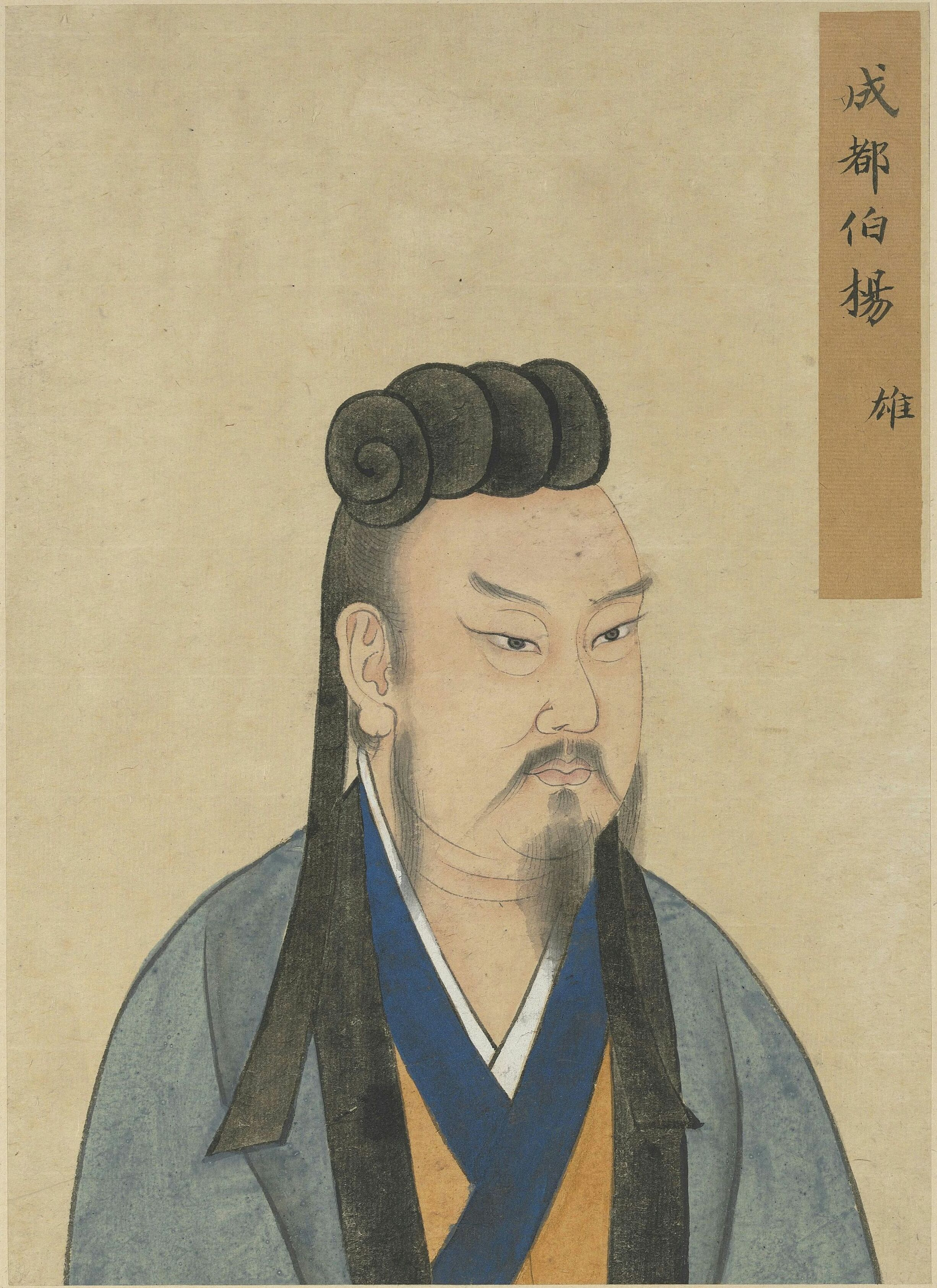
- Medieval representation of Yang Xiong
- Traditional Chinese: 揚雄
- Simplified Chinese: 扬雄
Transcriptions
Standard Mandarin
- Hanyu Pinyin: Yáng Xióng
- Wade–Giles: Yang^{2} Hsiung^{2}
- IPA: [jǎŋ ɕjʊ̌ŋ]
Yue: Cantonese
- Yale Romanization: Yèuhng Hùhng
- Jyutping: Joeng^{4} Hung^{4}
- IPA: [jœŋ˩ hʊŋ˩]
Southern Min
- Tâi-lô: Iông Hiông
Middle Chinese
- Middle Chinese: Yang Ɣiong
Old Chinese
- Baxter–Sagart (2014): *lang ɢʷəng

Yang Xiong (Chinese: 揚雄; 53 BCE – 18 CE), courtesy name Ziyun (子雲), was a Chinese philosopher, poet, linguist and politician of the Western Han dynasty known for his philosophical writings and fu poetry compositions.

== Bibliography ==
Together with Sima Xiangru, Yang was one of the most famous and illustrious figures of the entire Han dynasty. The Book of Han (Hanshu) devotes a full two-part chapter to both Yang and Sima, an honor surpassing that of even the most famous generals and ministers.

Yang's most famous work is the Fayan, a philosophical work modeled on the Analects, in which Yang criticizes fu writers for focusing on ornate, esoteric language while ignoring more important issues of morality. Yang's other works include the Taixuanjing, a divination text based on the I Ching, "Justification Against Ridicule" (解嘲; Jiě cháo), one of the best known examples of the "fu of frustration" subgenre, and the Fangyan, a dictionary documenting regional vocabulary from throughout China at the time.

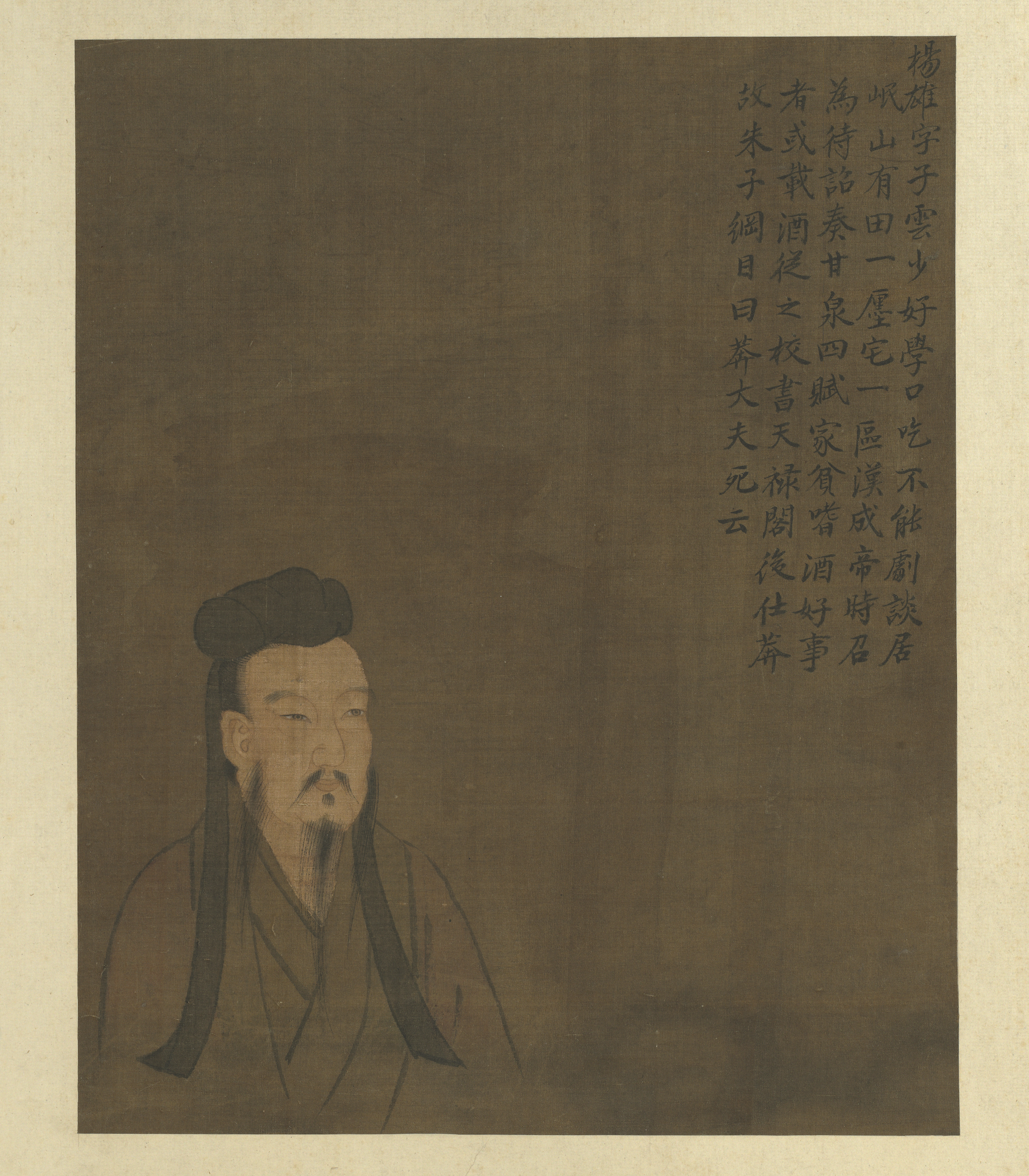
Portrait of Yang Xiong (National Palace Museum)

== Philosophy ==
Writers in the Tang dynasty juxtaposed Yang Xiong with Mencius and Xunzi, with Mencius (fl. 4th century BCE) considering human nature good, Xunzi (c. 300–230 BCE) human nature bad, and Yang Xiong considering it intermixed.

Yang Xiong was a close associate of the official and philosopher Huan Tan (d. 28 CE), an Old Texts realist who may have heavily influenced the works of Wang Chong (27–c. 100 CE). He was hailed by Huan Tan as the "Confucius from the western parts".

Yang is also known for his protest against the verbosity of fu poetry. Although fu "stimulated writing as a craft", the Confucian propriety of fu's form was earlier questioned by Emperor Xuan of Han.

== Life and career ==
Like a number of the other well-known writers of the Han dynasty, Yang was from Shu (modern Sichuan province), specifically the suburban Pi (Pi County) area of the Chengdu provincial capital. Yang claimed that his family had moved south from the state of Jin during its civil infighting in the 6th century BCE.

As a youth, Yang studied under master Zhang Zun, contributing to his wide range of interests. He became an admirer of the Warring States period Chu poet Qu Yuan, and an imitator of his own Shu forebear Sima Xiangru. His ability and success in fu composition earned him a summons to the imperial capital at Chang'an to serve as an "Expectant Official", responsible for composing poems and fu for the emperor.

Yang's position required him to praise the virtue and glory of Emperor Cheng of Han and the grandeur of imperial outings, but he was disturbed by the wasteful extravagance of the imperial court. Yang attempted to return the fu genre to a focus of "suasive admonition" (諷; fèng), which he believed was the original purpose of the earliest fu-type writings of Qu Yuan, but his couched admonitions against extravagance went unnoticed and unheeded by Emperor Cheng.

== Autobiography ==
The Hanshu (Book of Han) states that its Yang Xiong biography is based on his then-extant autobiography. Together with personal outlines and summaries of Yang Xiong's broader works, introductions to his poetry make up largest part of the biography. If introductions to his poetry are included, then the autobiography makes up the main part of the biography, with introductory and ending commentary by Ban Gu, the Hanshu's author.

David R. Knechtges divided the biography into two elements, being lengthy "autobiographical" excerpts, and added commentaries by Ban Gu. Though he considered its autobiographical content "potentially more reliable", he notes that Ban Gu could well have gotten information on Yang Xiong from his own family, as his father and uncle knew him.

Early scholarship considered the poetry introductions to have been commentaries by Ban Gu. Discussing the dating, purpose and circumstances of composition of his poems, though their style lends them to a third person reading, they are arguably based on his autobiography. Knechtges translates them in first person, arguing that they are part of Yang Xiong's autobiographical section alongside his other personal outlines and summaries.

== Hanshu contents ==
Yang Xiong's biography follows the format of other dynastic history biographies.

Not counting introductions to Yang Xiong's poetry, Ban Gu's commentaries otherwise include introductory commentary on Yang Xiong's personality and character and an appraisal of him at the end. Appraisals are included in all Hanshu biographies, excepting that Yang Xiong's is longer. It includes introductory statements on him by his contemporaries Liu Xin and Huan Tan, and commentary by Ban Gu on his court career, especially under Wang Mang.

The larger part of the biography includes and discusses poetry and rhapsody, including seven of Yang Xiong's fu and essays, critique of the fu genre, and introductions to poems, including their dating, purpose and circumstances of composition. The biography otherwise includes an introductory genealogy, a personal outline of his cosmological Taixuanjing work, and personal chapter summaries of his famous philosophical work the Fayan.

Seven of Yang Xiong's fu poems or rhapsodies and essays make up the largest portion of the biography. Of the seven, three essays not named as rhapsodies are still composed much like rhapsodies. Knechtges translates the seven as Refuting Sorrow, Sweet Springs Palace Rhapsody, Hedong Rhapsody, Barricade Hunt Rhapsody, Tall Poplars Palace Rhapsody, Justification Against Ridicule, and Justification Against Objection.
