= Michael Nylan =

American historian

- Born: 1950 (age 75–76)
- Education: University of California, Berkeley (B.A.); University at Buffalo (M.A.); Princeton University (Ph.D.)
- Awards: Guggenheim Fellowship
- Scientific career
- Fields: Early Chinese History
- Workplaces: University of California, Berkeley

Chinese name
- Chinese: 戴梅可
Transcriptions
Standard Mandarin
- Hanyu Pinyin: Dài Méikě

Michael Nylan is the Jane K. Sather Chair of History at the University of California, Berkeley. She writes about history, literature, philosophy, art and archaeology of early imperial China.

Nylan was born in 1950 and named after Saint Michael by her mother, thankful for a successful birth after a series of miscarriages. After undergraduate and masters study in history, she studied Classical Chinese with Michael Loewe and fell in love with the subject. Her doctoral work at Princeton University was in history and archaeology. She was one of the first American scholars in China after the opening in the 1970s, but her stay at the Institute of Archaeology of the Chinese Academy of Social Sciences was unsuccessful, due to her male colleagues' refusal to take a woman on excavations. She was awarded a Guggenheim Fellowship in 2014.

== Selected works ==
- Ying Shao's Feng su t'ung yi: An Exploration of Problems in Han Dynasty Political, Philosophical, and Social Unity (Ph.D thesis), Princeton University, 1983.
- The Canon of Supreme Mystery: A Translation with Commentary of the T'ai hsuang ching, State University of New York Press, 1993.
- The Five "Confucian" Classics, Yale University Press, 2001, ISBN 978-0-300-08185-5.
- The Chinese Pleasure Book, Princeton University Press, 2018, ISBN 978-1-942130-13-0.
- The Art of War: Sunzi, Blackwells, 2020, ISBN 978-1-324-00489-9.
