= Canadian cuisine =

Culinary traditions of Canada

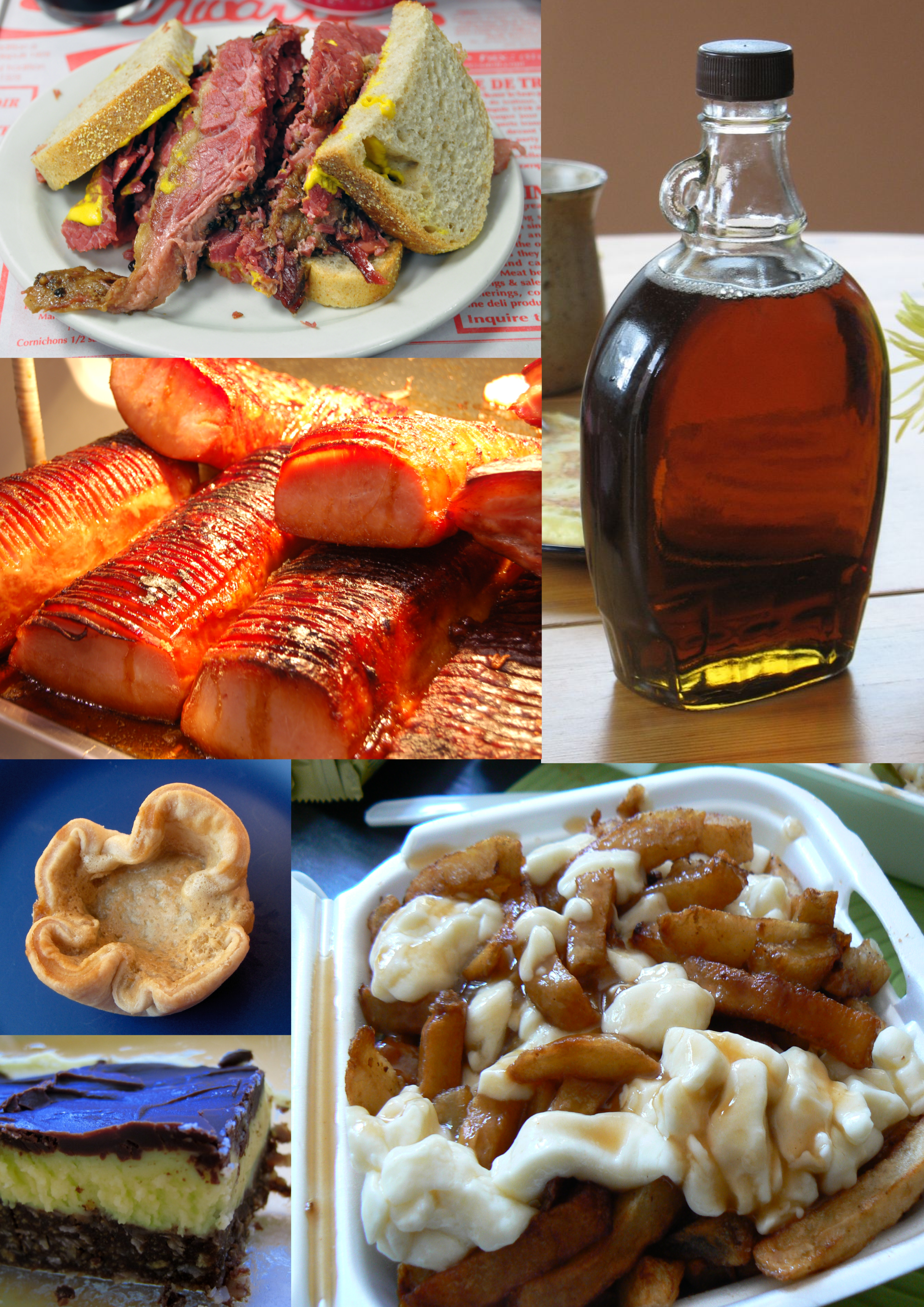
Clockwise from top left: Montreal-style smoked meat; maple syrup; poutine; Nanaimo bar; butter tart; and peameal bacon

Canadian cuisine consists of the cooking traditions and practices of Canada, with regional variances around the country. First Nations and Inuit have practiced their culinary traditions in what is now Canada for at least 15,000 years. The advent of European explorers and settlers, first on the east coast and then throughout the wider territories of New France, British North America and Canada, saw the melding of foreign recipes, cooking techniques, and ingredients with indigenous flora and fauna. Modern Canadian cuisine has maintained this dedication to local ingredients and terroir, as exemplified in the naming of specific ingredients based on their locale, such as Malpeque oysters or Alberta beef. Accordingly, Canadian cuisine privileges the quality of ingredients and regionality, and may be broadly defined as a national tradition of "creole" culinary practices, based on the complex multicultural and geographically diverse nature of both historical and contemporary Canadian society.

Divisions within Canadian cuisine can be traced along regional lines and have a direct connection to the historical immigration patterns of each region or province. The earliest cuisines of Canada are based on Indigenous, English, Scottish and French roots. The traditional cuisines of both French- and English-Canada have evolved from those carried over to North America from France and the British Isles respectively, and from their adaptation to Indigenous customs, labour-intensive and/or mobile lifestyles, and hostile environmental conditions. French Canadian cuisine can also be divided into Québécois cuisine and Acadian cuisine. Regional cuisines have continued to develop with subsequent waves of immigration during the 19th, 20th, and 21st centuries, such as from Central Europe, Southern Europe, Eastern Europe, South Asia, East Asia, and the Caribbean. There are many culinary practices and dishes that can be either identified as particular to Canada, such as fish and brewis, peameal bacon, pot roast and meatloaf, or sharing an association with countries from which immigrants to Canada carried over their cuisine, such as fish and chips, roast beef, and bannock.

== Definitions ==
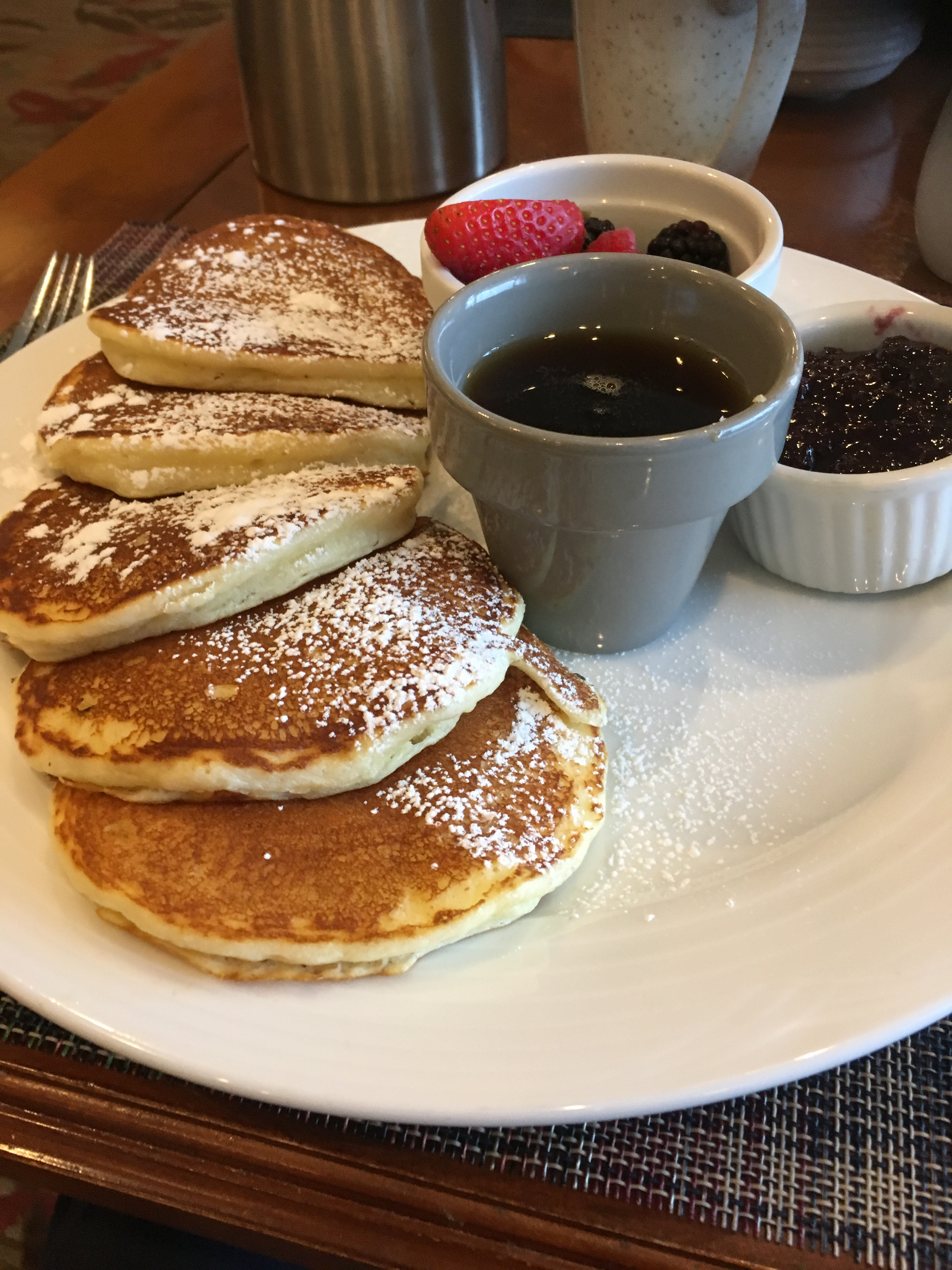
Pancake breakfast in Calgary

Though certain dishes may be identified as "Canadian" due to the ingredients used or the origin of their inception, an overarching style of Canadian cuisine may be more difficult to define. Some commentators, such as former prime minister Joe Clark, believe Canadian cuisine to be a collage of dishes from a variety of cultures. Clark has been paraphrased to have noted that "Canada has a cuisine of cuisines. Not a stew pot, but a smorgasbord." Canadian food culture writer and author Jennifer Cochrall-King has said that "there is no single definition of Canadian cuisine. It starts with ingredients that spring from the landscape and with traditional dishes steeped in the region's history and culture."

While the immense size of Canada, and the diversity of its inhabitants, compounds the difficulty in identifying a monolithic Canadian culinary tradition, Hersch Jacobs acknowledges that the lack of a hegemonic definition does not preclude the existence of Canadian cuisine. Lenore Newman argues that there is a distinctly Canadian creole cuisine, and identifies five key properties that together define Canadian cuisine: its reliance on seasonality, multiculturalism, wild foods, regional dishes, and the privileging of ingredients over recipes. This adaptation, preparation, and emphasis on specific local ingredients is of particular note, and a common theme in Canadian food is the use of foreign recipes, introduced by immigrants and their descendants, that have been modified for use of local products. Tourtière, for example, is a Canadian meat pie of French origin that can be cooked with beef, pork or fish. The sections on regionality and national foods below illustrate this tradition of diversity and emphasis on local elements, such as dulse and lobster in the Maritimes, deer meats in the Northern Territories, salmon and crab in British Columbia, or maple syrup in Central Canada.

Indigenous food may be considered uniquely Canadian, and the influence of Métis culture can be considered to have played a particularly important role in the origin of a distinct Canadian cuisine. Foods such as bannock, moose, deer, bison, pemmican, maple taffy, and Métis stews, such as barley stew, are all either traditional Indigenous foods, or originate from Canada with roots in Indigenous cuisines, and are eaten throughout the country.

There are many foods of foreign origin that are eaten commonly and considered integrated constituents of Canadian cuisine. Pierogi (dumplings of Central and Eastern European origin) are an example, due to the large number of early Ukrainian and Polish immigrants, while the ubiquity of roast beef and Yorkshire pudding are an example of the heavy English influence. As much of Canadian cuisine is coloured by the adaptation and development of dishes brought over by European, and later Asian, settlers, there is a variety of noteworthy Canadian variations on pre-established templated food and drink, with their own nationally defined particularities, such as Canadian Cheddar cheese, whisky, bread, wine, bacon, and pancakes.

In general, much of what is considered to be traditional Canadian cuisine contains strong elements of richness, breads and starches, game meat, and often stews and soups. Certain culinary traditions in Canada, such as the frying of dough, which developed out of the country's voyaging and frontier culture, have seen to both the creation of distinct national foods and the flourishing of a broader national association with certain types of dishes. In the case of frying dough, for example, particular foods originating from Canada would include beavertails, apple fritters and toutons, whilst foods such as doughnuts, cronuts, bannock, bagels, and pancakes, though not physically originating from Canada, have nonetheless developed within a broader tradition of nationally recognized cuisine.

== History ==
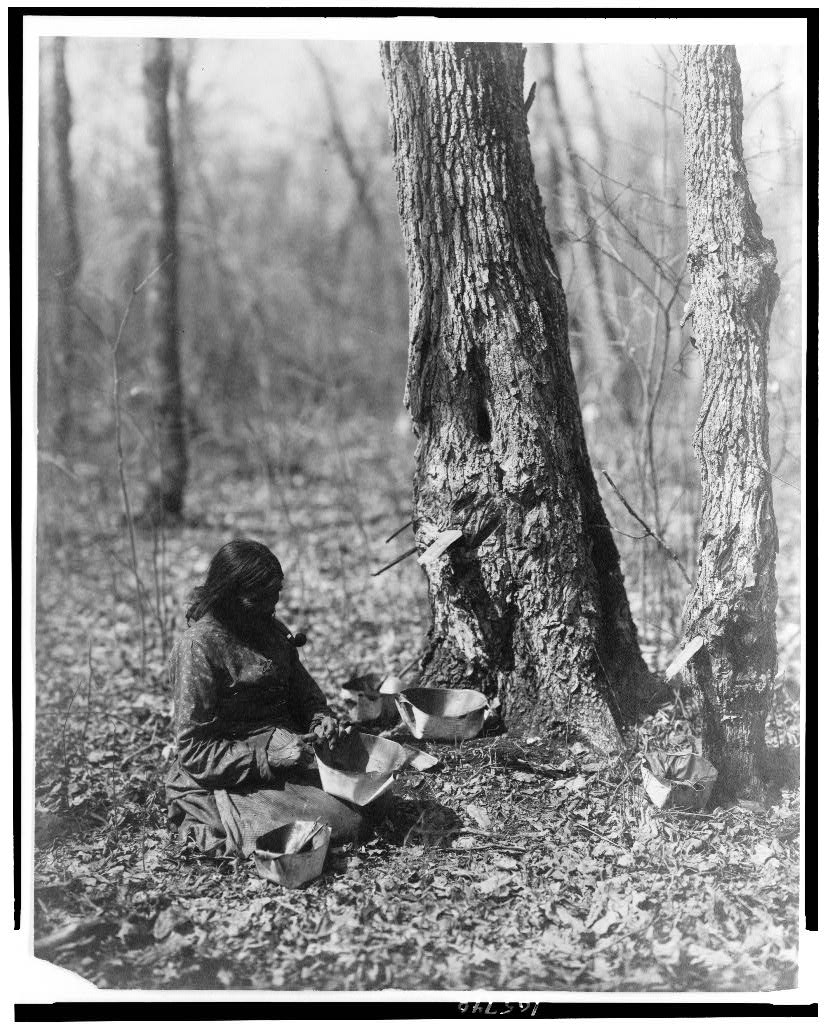
A 1908 photo of an Ojibwe woman tapping for tree sap, which is made into maple syrup.

Canadian cuisine has been shaped by the historical and ongoing influences of Indigenous peoples, settlers and immigrants. Indigenous influences remain prevalent in Canada's contemporary food scene, alongside those of the three major immigrant groups of the 17th and 18th centuries: English, Scottish, and French. This diversity has been further expanded by subsequent waves of immigration in later centuries.

=== Indigenous ===
The traditional Indigenous cuisine of Canada is based on a mixture of wild game, foraged foods, and farmed agricultural products. Indigenous peoples are known to gather more than five-hundred plant species for food. They cultivate and forage a variety of plants, hunt a diversity of animals, and use various tools to boil, smoke/preserve and roast their food. Each region of Canada, with its own First Nations and Inuit, utilizes local resources and distinct preparation techniques for their cuisines.

Maple syrup was first collected and used by the Indigenous peoples of Eastern Canada and the north-eastern United States, and Canada remains the world's largest producer. Though the origin of maple syrup production is not clear, the earliest known syrups were made by repeatedly freezing the collected maple sap and removing the ice to concentrate the sugar in the remaining sap. Maple syrup is one of the most commonly consumed Canadian food of Indigenous origin.

Dried meat products such as pânsâwân and pemmican are commonly consumed by the Indigenous peoples of the plains. In particular, the former was a predecessor for North American-style beef jerky, with the processing methods adapted for beef.

In most of the Canadian West Coast and Pacific Northwest, Pacific salmon is an important food resource to the First Nations peoples, along with certain marine mammals. Salmon are consumed fresh during the spawning season, or smoked dry to create a jerky-like food that can be stored year-round. The latter food is commonly known and sold as "salmon jerky".

Whipped soapberry, known as sxusem (sk-HOO-shum, "Indian ice cream") in the Interior Salish languages of British Columbia, is consumed similarly to ice cream or as a cranberry-cocktail-like drink. It is known for being a kidney tonic, which are called agutak in Arctic Canada (with animal/fish fat).

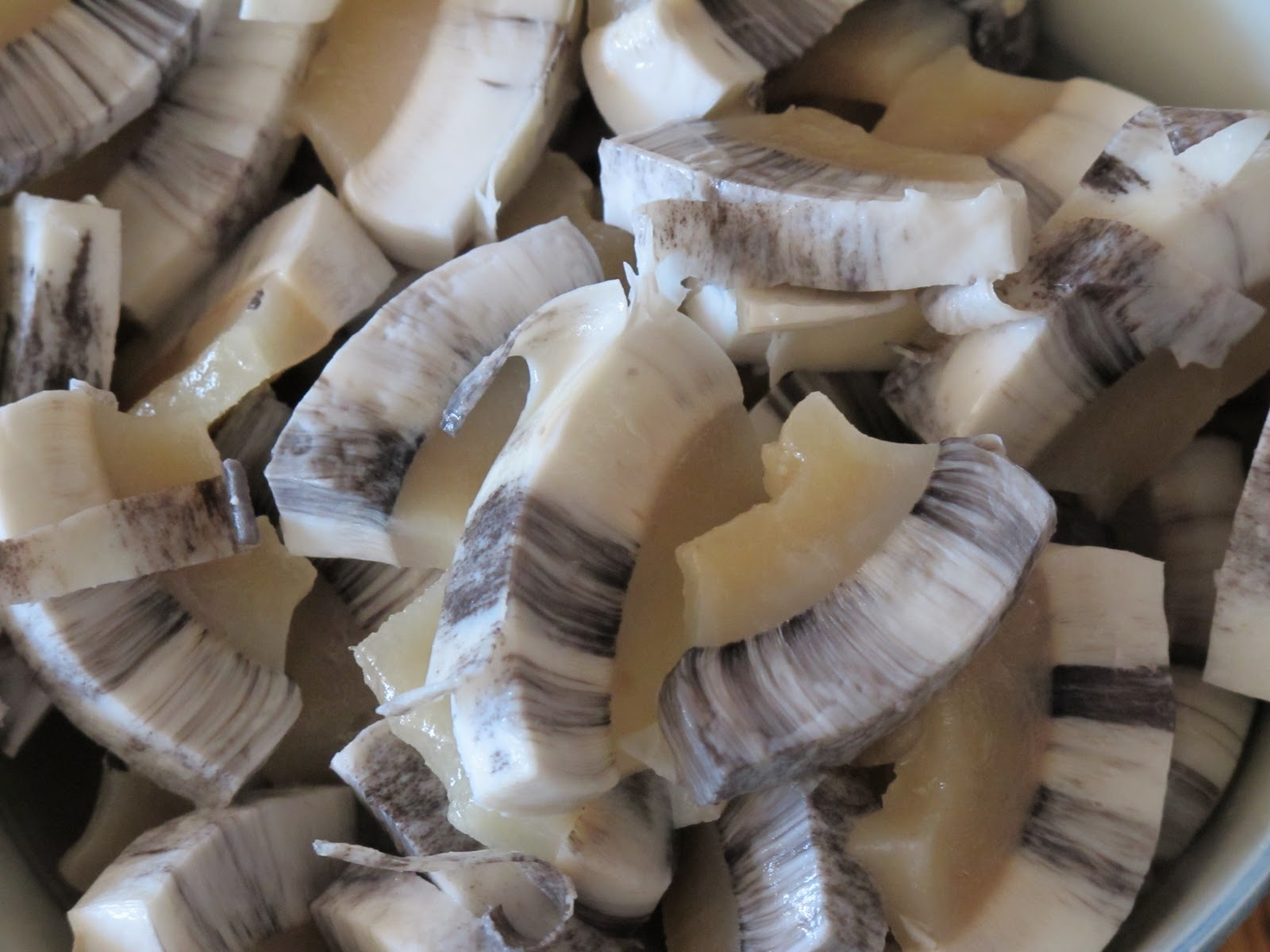
Sliced and prepared muktuk

In the Arctic, Inuit traditionally survived on a diet consisting of land and marine mammals, fish, and foraged plant products. Meats were consumed fresh, but also often prepared, cached, and allowed to ferment into igunaq or kiviak. These fermented meats have the consistency and smell of certain soft aged cheeses. Snacks such as muktuk, which consist of whale skin and blubber is eaten plain, though occasionally dipped in soy sauce. Chunks of muktuk are sliced with an ulu prior to or during consumption.

Fish are eaten boiled, fried, and prior to today's settlements, often in dried forms. The so-called "Eskimo potato", (Inuit: oak-kuk: Claytonia tuberosa) and other "mousefoods", are some of the plants consumed in the Arctic.

Foods such as "bannock", popular with First Nations and Inuit, reflect the historic exchange of these cultures with European fur traders, who brought with them new ingredients and foods. Common contemporary consumption of bannock, powdered milk, and bologna by Indigenous Canadians reflects the legacy of Canadian colonialism in the prohibition of hunting and fishing, and the institutional food rations provided to Indian reserves. Due to similarities in treatment under colonialism, many Native American communities throughout the continent consume similar food items, with some emphasis on local ingredients.

=== North and West European ===
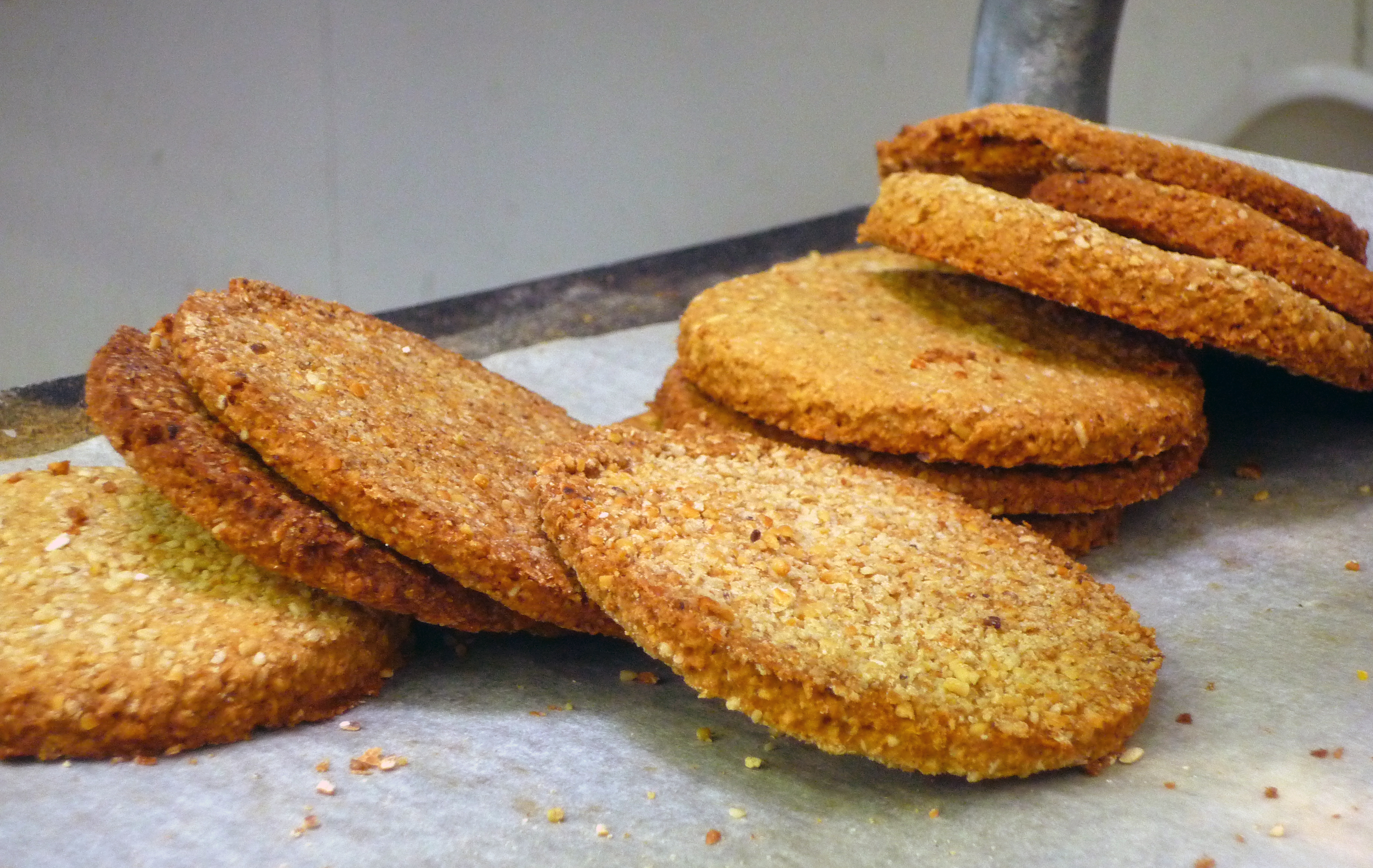
Oatcakes were first brought to Atlantic Canada by Scottish Highlanders in 1773, and remain a staple of Halifax coffee shops.

Settlers and traders from the British Isles account for the culinary influences of early English Canada in the Maritime provinces and Southern Ontario (Upper Canada). Cuisines found in Newfoundland and the Maritimes derive largely from British and Irish cooking, with a preference for salt-cured fish, beef, and pork. Ontario, Manitoba and British Columbia also maintain strong British culinary traditions. The French settlers of New France, who would become the Canadiens and Acadians, account for much of the cuisine of southern Quebec (Lower Canada), Northeastern Ontario, and New Brunswick.

Seafood had an important influence on the early European settlers and explorers of Atlantic Canada, which continues to be expressed in Maritime cuisine and culture to this day. In the late 15th-century, John Cabot's journey to the shores of what would become Newfoundland brought England knowledge of the Grand Banks and their abundance in cod. He is reported to have told King Henry VII that "the sea was covered with fish which could be caught not merely by nets, but weighted basket lowered into the water." Fleets of fishermen from England, France, Portugal, and Spain flocked to Newfoundland to return with fish, filling a market need in Europe and cutting out the necessity of importing from Iceland. The English, Scottish, Irish, and French settlers of what would become the Atlantic provinces frequently built their communities beside the ocean and rivers for easy access, and the fishing industry along the Canadian east coast steadily expanded until it became the region's major industry. Accounts from early settlers list fish that were caught, sold, and incorporated into local meals, such as trout, eels, mackerel, oysters, lobsters, salmon, cod and herring. Meals that incorporated such fish included, and continue to include, fried cod roe, fried or baked cod tongues, stewed or fried cod heads, fish hash, codfish balls, cod sounds, toast and fish, roasted scrawn, fish and brewis, salt fish and potatoes, and boiled rounders, among others. The abundance of seafood and the ease by which it could be obtained made the British and French colonies of Nova Scotia, New Brunswick, Acadia, Prince Edward Island, and Newfoundland and Labrador attractive destinations for settlers.

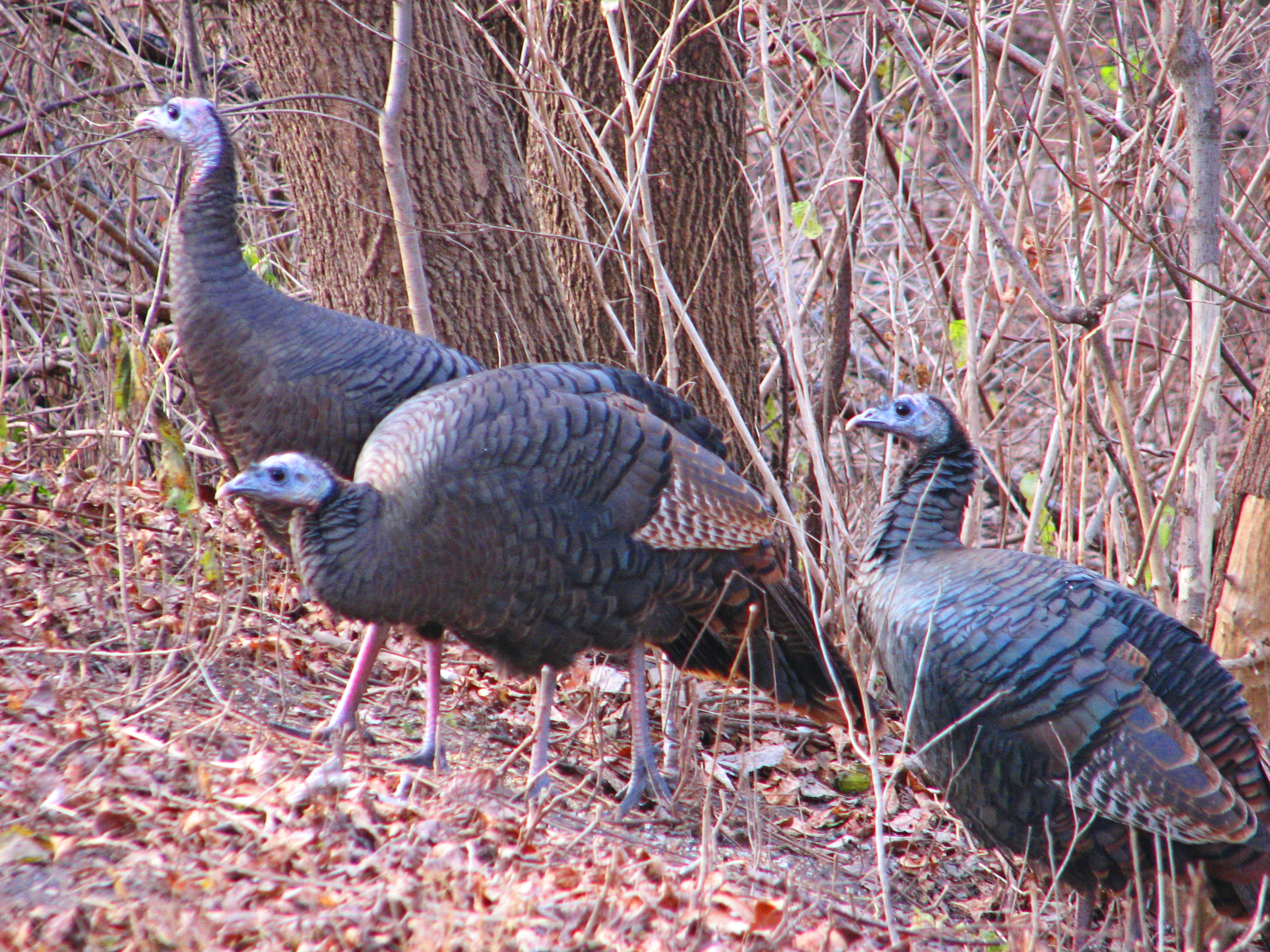
Wild turkeys in Ottawa

The influx of United Empire Loyalists into British North America in the 18th century, and the subsequent establishment of Upper Canada, saw the wider expansion of British cooking with indigenous ingredients in the future province of Ontario. These settlers established customs similar to their compatriots in England, but with a particular focus on dietary staples, such as meat, bread, and tea. Local forage and game were typically incorporated into the cooking of early English-Canadians in Upper Canada, such as wild berries, maple sugar, venison, partridge, waterfowl, maize, pumpkin, and turkey. Meals often contained more meat than was typical in England and were particularly reliant on pork and potatoes during early settlement, although these meals began to include beef and mutton as farming became more established in the region. Roasting was a common method of cooking for Upper Canadians, and Scottish immigration, largely onset by the Highland Clearances, brought a wider emphasis on mutton.

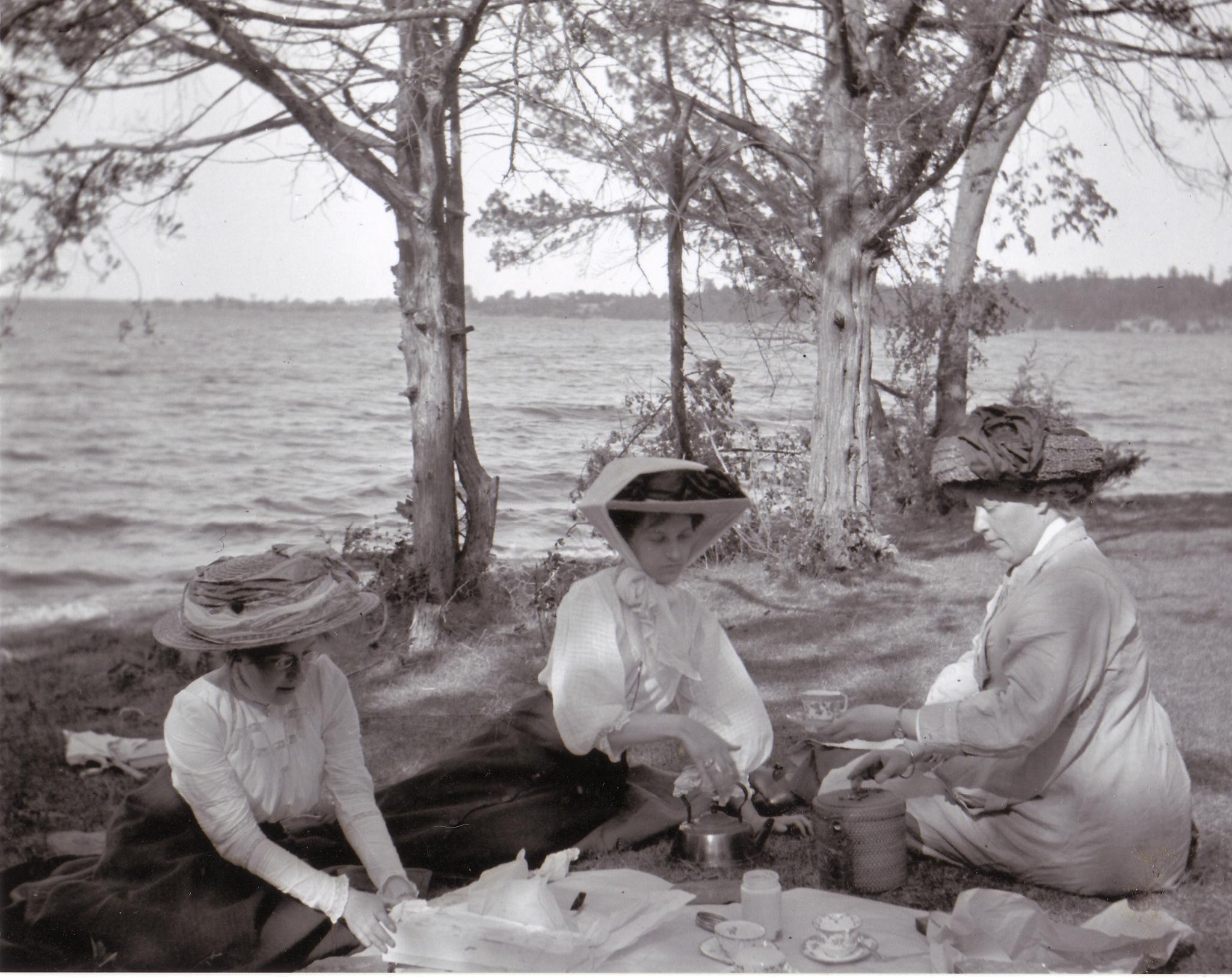
Canadians taking tea at a picnic beside the Bay of Quinte, Prince Edward County (1909 August)

The Victorian era saw a greater swell of British immigration to Upper Canada, Lower Canada, and the Atlantic colonies; further, the urban and rural development that followed encouraged the spread of eating establishments, local cookbooks, and a busier ingredients market. By the mid-19th century, there was a tavern every couple odd miles along the major roads of Upper Canada; reportedly, there were 29 such establishments along the route between Halifax and Digby, Nova Scotia alone. The larger urban centres, such as Toronto, Kingston, and Coburg in Upper Canada, Montreal and Quebec City in Lower Canada, and Halifax in Nova Scotia, saw the opening of hotels that could better serve a burgeoning upper class of Victorian patrons. These hotels, broadly, provided beef steak, fried pork, buckwheat cakes, roast beef and pork, wild game and fowl, vegetables, pudding, and tea. Cookbooks published during this period include The Home Cookbook (1877) and The Galt Cook Book (1898). Traditions that developed out of the Victorian era in Canada include the Victorian cooking fireplace, which saw continued use in homes and restaurants even after the metal stove was introduced, and picnics, which often involved ham, fowl, meat pies, tarts, and cakes.

In the territory of Rupert's Land, the development of communities throughout the 17th, 18th, and early 19th centuries, which centred around Hudson's Bay Company and North West Company trading posts, saw to the intermingling of European (largely Scottish and French) traders, clerks, guides, and canoers with the local Indigenous population. The resulting genesis of the Métis culture saw to the development of cuisine in the Canadian West which combined the culinary traditions of these previously separate groups. With the arrival of the Earl of Selkirk and his Scottish retinue (people largely displaced by the Highland Clearances), as well as the purchase of forty-five million acres of land in the Red River Valley, many Scottish culinary traditions were brought to the region. These foods included black bun, haggis, honey cakes, and rowies. Cooperation with the local Métis saw Scottish immigrants hunting buffalo and incorporating game into their meals. The completion of the Canadian Pacific Railway in the late 19th-century led to a significant influx of not just settlers of British origin, but of also a multitude of different backgrounds, notably Ukrainian, Polish, German, Scandinavian, Belgian, Dutch, Greek, Czech, Slovak, Chinese, American, Mennonite, and Jewish. It is in this way that the Canadian Prairies, or the future provinces of Alberta, Saskatchewan, and Manitoba, were a frontier of multicultural community-building in Canada, and the creation of a regional cuisine which absorbed influences from a variety of ethnic, national, and religious backgrounds.

Icelandic immigration has a particular influence on the cuisine of Manitoba, which, besides Iceland itself, has a larger Icelandic population than anywhere else in the world. One example is vinarterta, a layer cake filled with prune jam and flavoured with cardamom, and a popular Christmas treat in Manitoba. Bakeries in the province often include other pastries brought over and adapted from Iceland, including kleinur (similar to doughnuts), laufabrauð (flatbread decorated with patterns), kransakaka (a type of cake with almonds), and ugbraud (a rye bread).

Ontario's southwestern regions also have strong Dutch and Scandinavian influences.

=== Central and East European ===
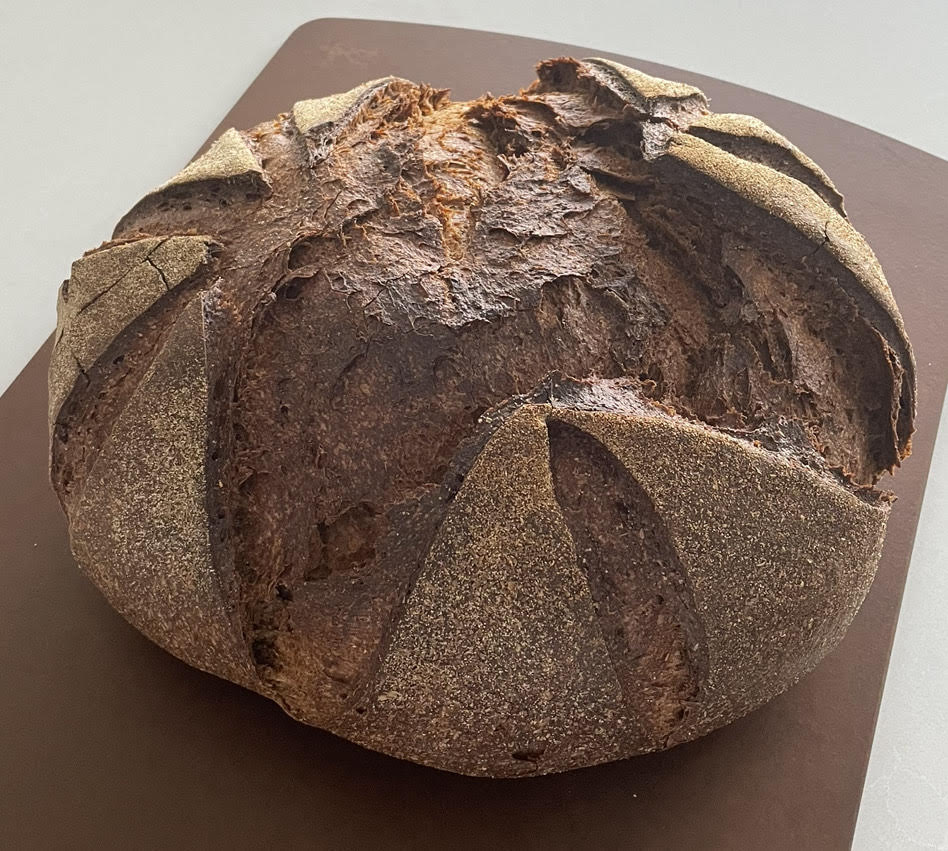
Loaf of Ukrainian rye bread from New Westminster

In Canada's Prairie provinces, which saw significant immigration from Eastern and Northern Europe in the pre-WWI era, Ukrainian, German, and Polish cuisines are strong culinary influences. Such examples include perogi, kielbasa, and babka. Emigration from Russia to Western Canada in the late 19th and early 20th centuries also established a Doukhobor influence, noted in particular for its emphasis on vegetarian recipes on the cuisine of the British Columbia Interior and the Prairies.

The Waterloo, Ontario, region and the southern portion of Manitoba have traditions of Mennonite and German cookery.

Jewish immigrants to Canada during the late 1800s played a significant culinary role within Canada, chiefly renowned for Montreal-style bagels and Montreal-style smoked meat. A regional variation of both emerged within Winnipeg, Manitoba's Jewish community, which also derived Winnipeg-style cheesecake from New York City recipes. Winnipeg has given birth to numerous other unique dishes, such as the schmoo torte, smoked goldeye and "co-op style" rye bread and cream cheese.

=== East Asian ===
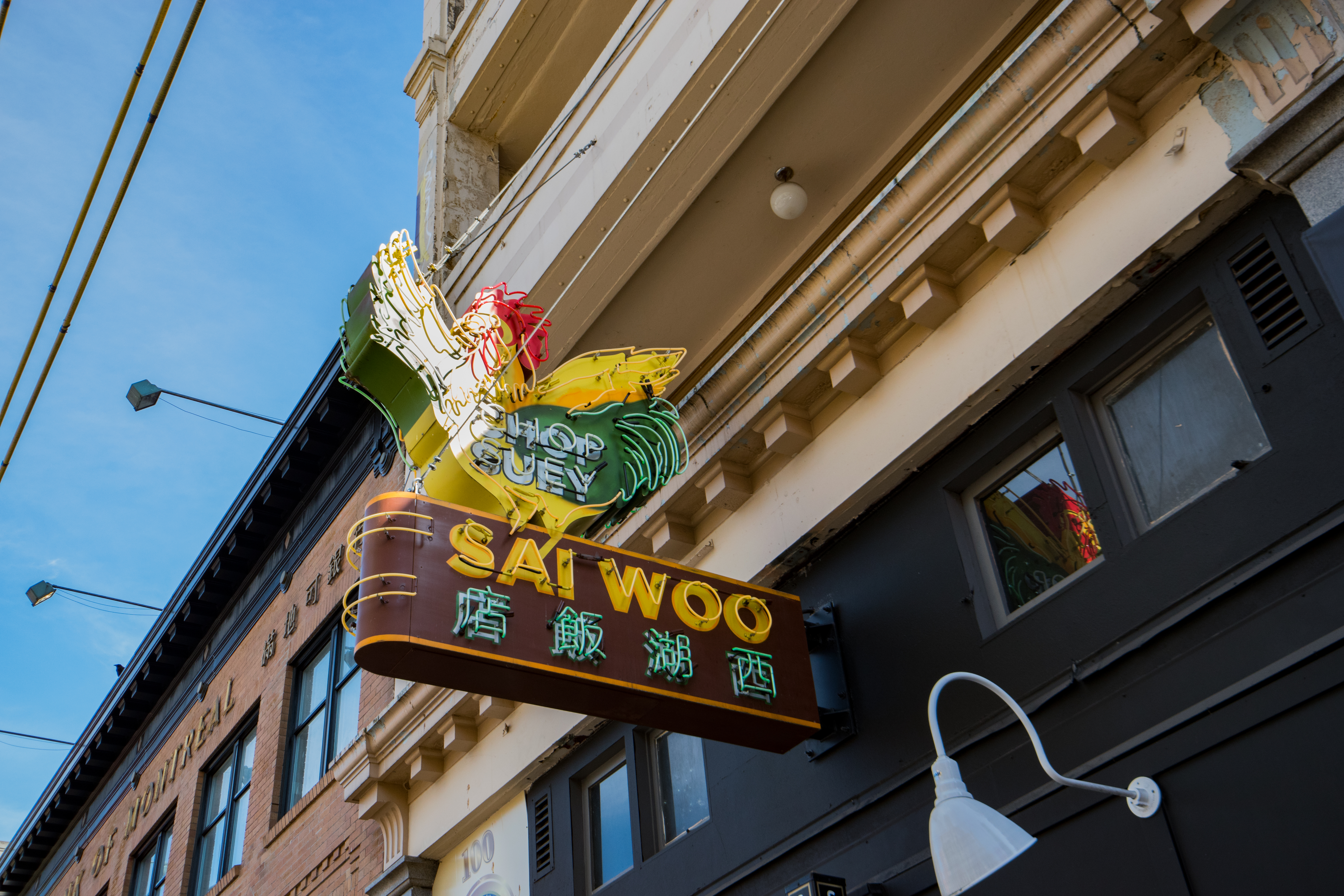
Sai Woo restaurant and heritage building in Vancouver Chinatown

Chinese immigration to Canada, beginning predominantly in the 1850s, saw to the local modification of dishes imported from Qing China. Much of what are considered to be "Chinese dishes" in Canada are largely Canadian or North American inventions, with Chinese restaurants having tailored their traditional cuisine to local tastes, local ingredients, and a largely non-Chinese clientele. This "Canadian Chinese cuisine" is widespread across the country, with great variation from place to place. Examples of such variation are seen in unique regional dishes, including Calgary ginger beef, Montreal peanut-butter dumplings, Newfoundland chow mein, and Thunder Bay bon bons.

The "Chinese buffet", although found in other parts of North America, traces its origins to early Gastown, Vancouver, c. 1870. This meal format developed from the practice of Chinese restaurateurs providing a steam table on a sideboard to serve Scandinavian lumberjacks working in local forests and mills.

Japanese-Canadians have had a profound influence on the cuisines of British Columbia and Ontario. Distinct varieties of sushi, such as the B.C. roll and the California roll, originate from the Metro Vancouver region, while sushi pizza was invented in Toronto. Japadog street food in Vancouver is also a popular example of Canadian west coast fusion cuisine.

=== South Asian ===
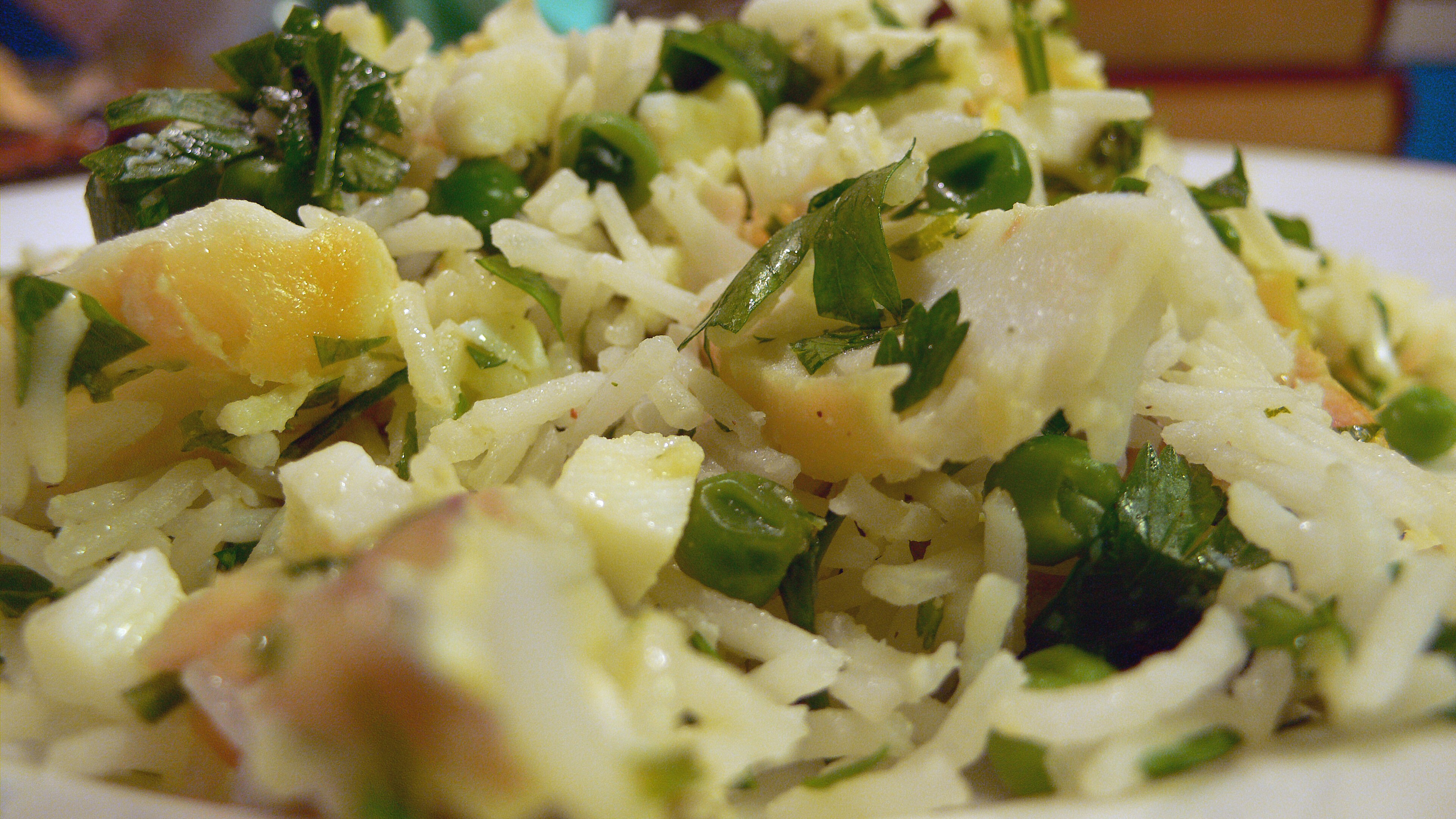
Kedgeree, an Anglo-Indian dish imported from the British Raj, is commonly found in Indo-Canadian restaurants.

Indian and South Asian culinary influences are a relatively recent addition to Canadian cuisine, having gained wider prominence in the country during the post-1960's era of immigration, despite earlier South Asian settlement in British Columbia dating back to the late 19th century. Indian food is particularly popular in Canada, deriving mostly from Northern Indian cuisine. It is characterized for its use of bread, curry, and use of yogurt and cream for meat-based dishes; it also draws inspiration from South Indian cuisine in its use of sour and spicy combinations.

Unique Indo-Canadian food includes the East Indian roti wrap, which gained popularity in Toronto during the 1980s and 1990s; using North Indian/Pakistani bread and curries as stuffing, local chefs originally drew inspiration from the West Indian roti which had entered the city's food scene in the 1960s and 1970s after a wave of Caribbean immigration. Also known as butter chicken roti, the dish is served at many Indian restaurants and fast food locations across Southern Ontario.

Other Canadian food unique to the South Asian community includes "Indian-style pizza" (also known as "Punjabi-style pizza" or "Desi-style pizza") which has gradually gained popularity since originating in Greater Vancouver during the 1980s. Indian-style pizza has since expanded outside of Greater Vancouver, across other urban centres in western and central Canada with large South Asian populations, including Calgary, Edmonton, Regina, Winnipeg, Ottawa, and Greater Toronto, later expanding to other regions. (Note: "You can find Indian-style pizzas, often complete with butter chicken, from St. John's to Winnipeg to a vineyard restaurant in B.C.'s Okanagan Valley.") This type of pizza typically includes sauce with mixed spices and toppings such as cilantro, ginger, spinach, cauliflower, tandoori chicken, butter chicken, or paneer.

=== Southeast Asian ===
Contributions from Southeast Asia to Canadian cuisine includes a style of medium-thick crust pizza Margherita in Toronto. An example of fusion cuisine, the pizza is topped with garlic and basil oil topping, combining an Italian pizza with the Vietnamese tradition of using herbed oil toppings in food.

== Regional ingredients ==
While numerous and varied ingredients are commonly found throughout Canada, each region, with its tradition of culinary development, utilizes locally derived ingredients, both wild and agricultural, which are used to define unique dishes. The table below is meant to provide particular examples of regional staples and their key local ingredient.

Ingredients and defining dishes by region
Ingredient	Defining dish	Pacific	Mountain	Prairies	Ontario	Quebec	Atlantic	Northern
Atlantic cod	Fish and brewis, Cod tongues						X	
Beef	Alberta grilled beef steak, Ginger beef		X	X				
Caribou	Caribou stew							X
Bakeapple	Bakeapple pie, Bakeapple jam						X	
Digby scallops	Seared scallops						X	
Dulse	Dulse crisps						X	
Fiddlehead ferns	Boiled fiddleheads				X	X	X	
Geoduck	Sashimi geoduck	X						
Harp seal	Flipper pie						X	X
Lamb	Salt Spring Island grilled lamb chops	X						
Lobster	Boiled lobster, Lobster roll					X	X	
Maple syrup	Pancakes				X	X	X	
Pacific Dungeness crab	Boiled crab legs, Crab cakes	X						
Pacific salmon	Smoked salmon, Candied salmon	X						
Pork	Farmer sausage, Kubasa / Kubie burger,Peameal bacon			X				
Potatoes	Poutine				X	X	X	
Saskatoon berry	Saskatoon berry jam, Saskatoon berry pie	X	X	X				
Soapberry	Sxusem	X						
Summer savoury	Dressing						X	
Winnipeg goldeye	Smoked goldeye			X				

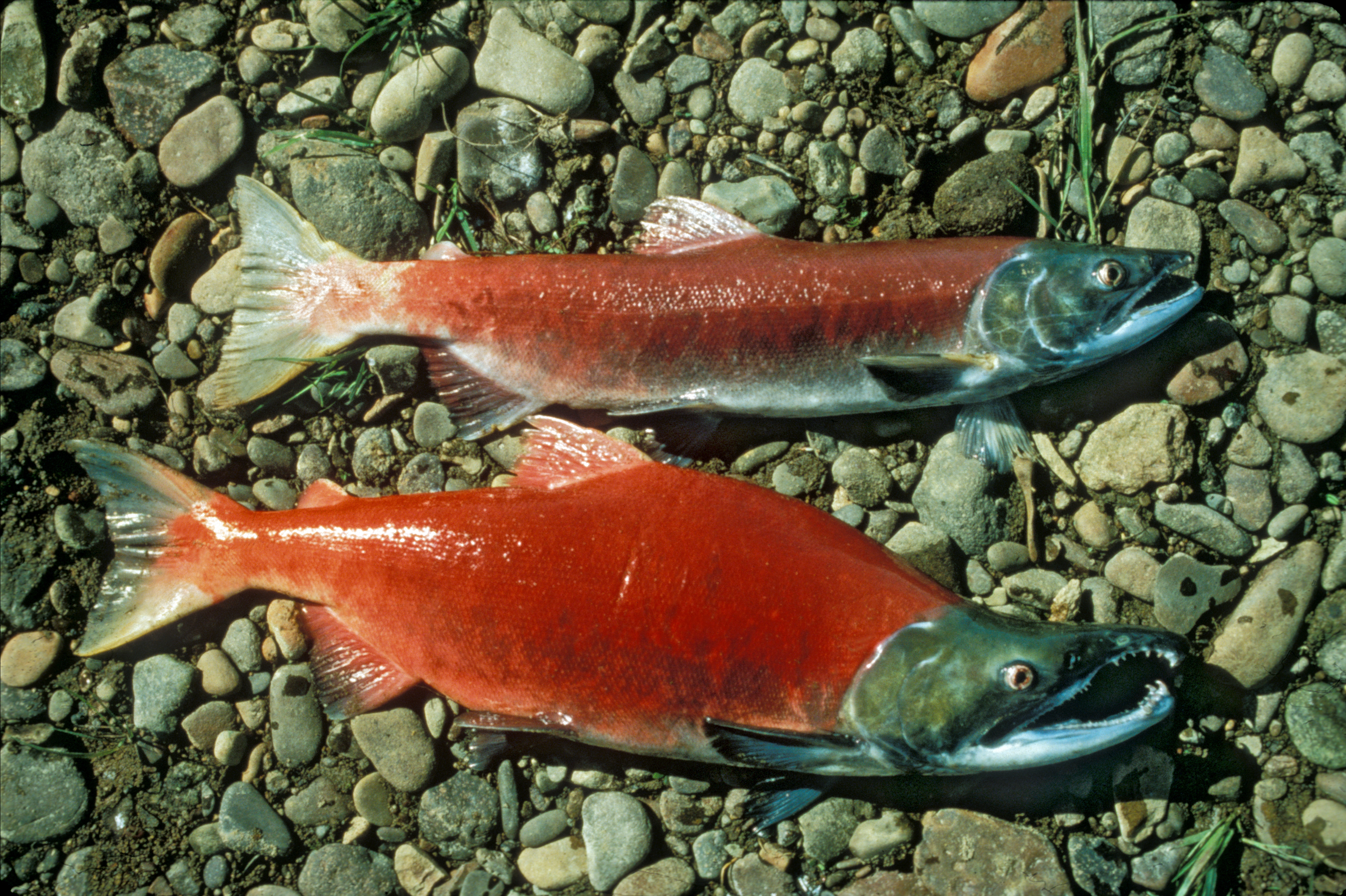
Pacific sockeye salmon

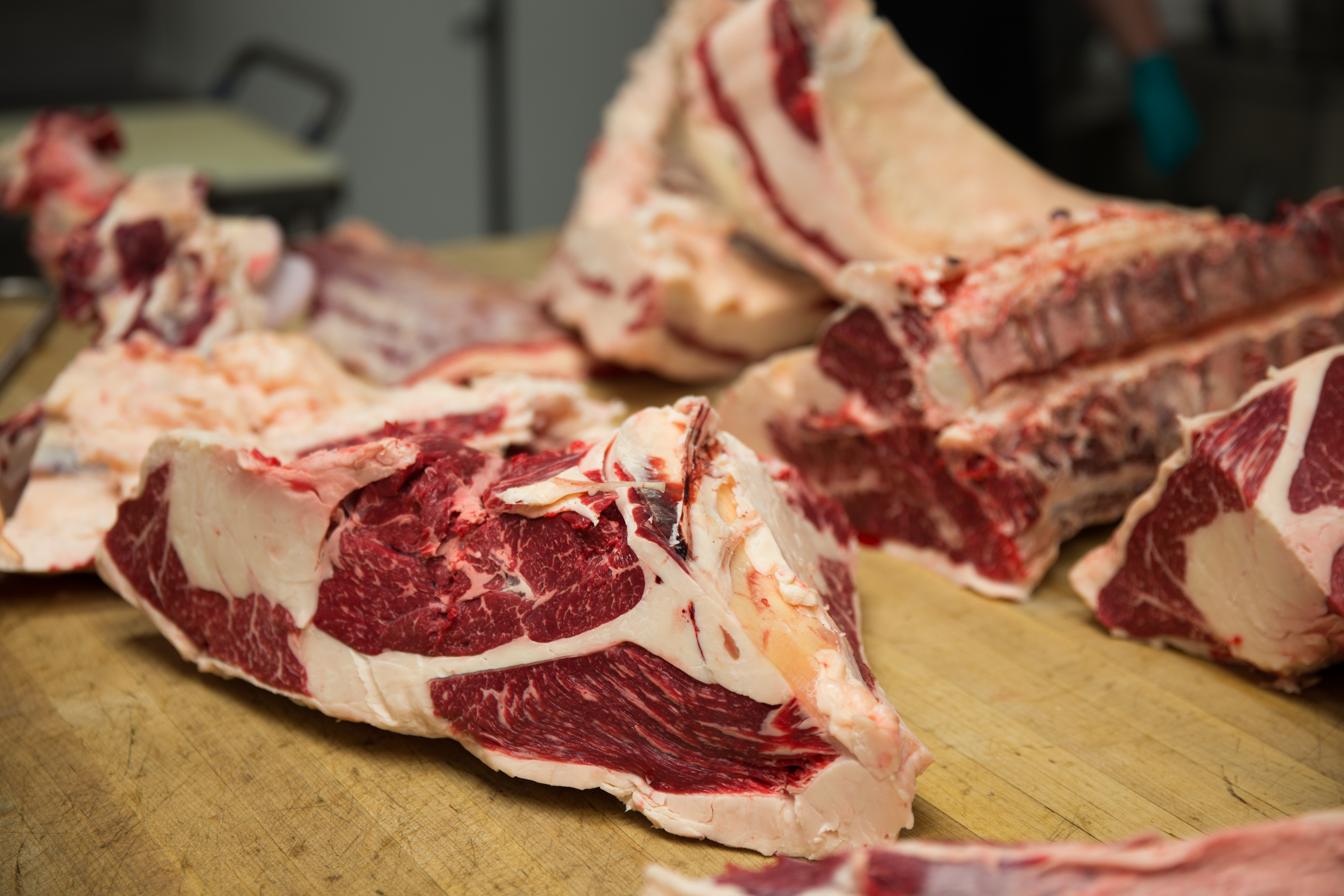
Alberta beef

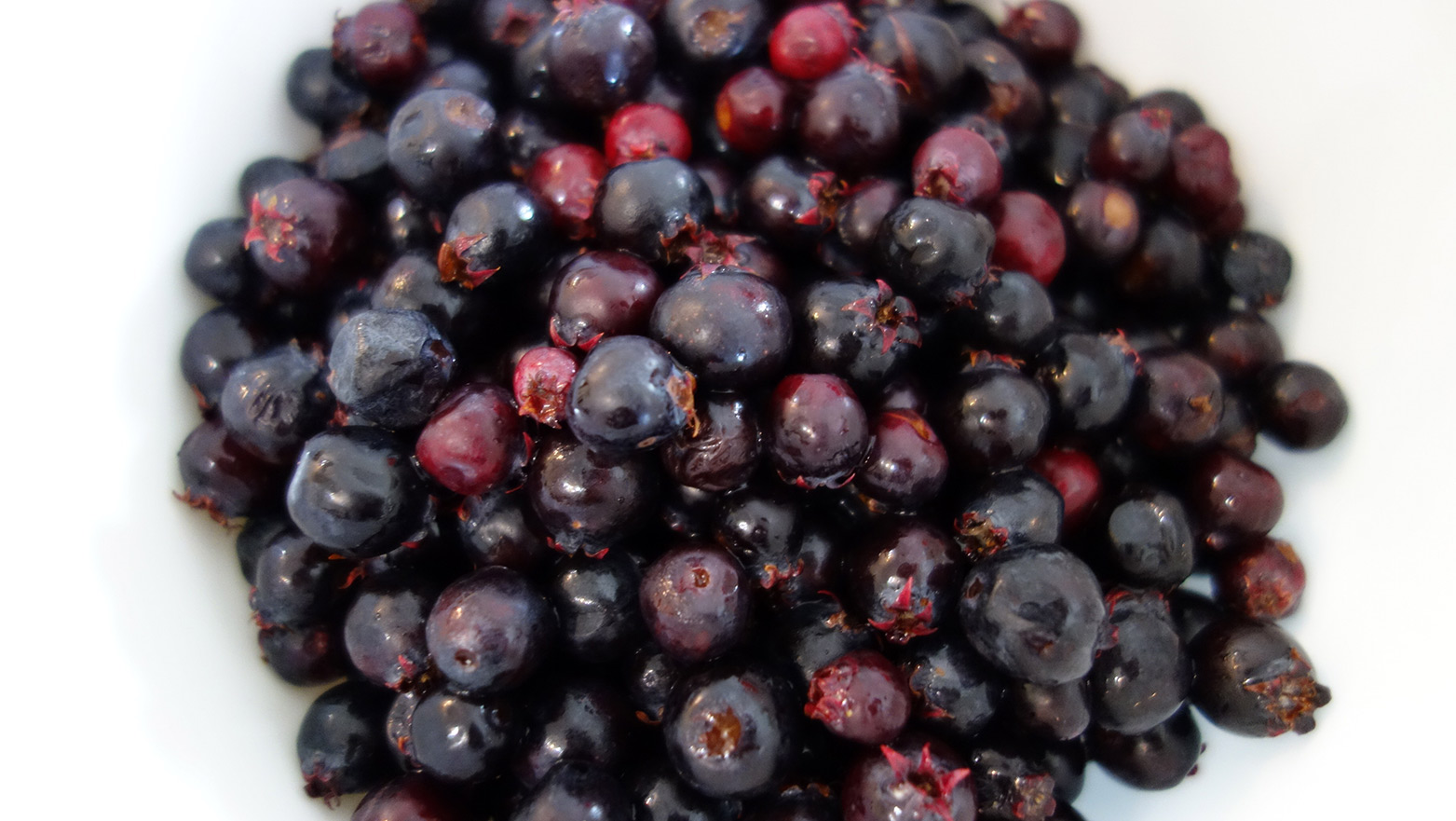
Saskatoon berries

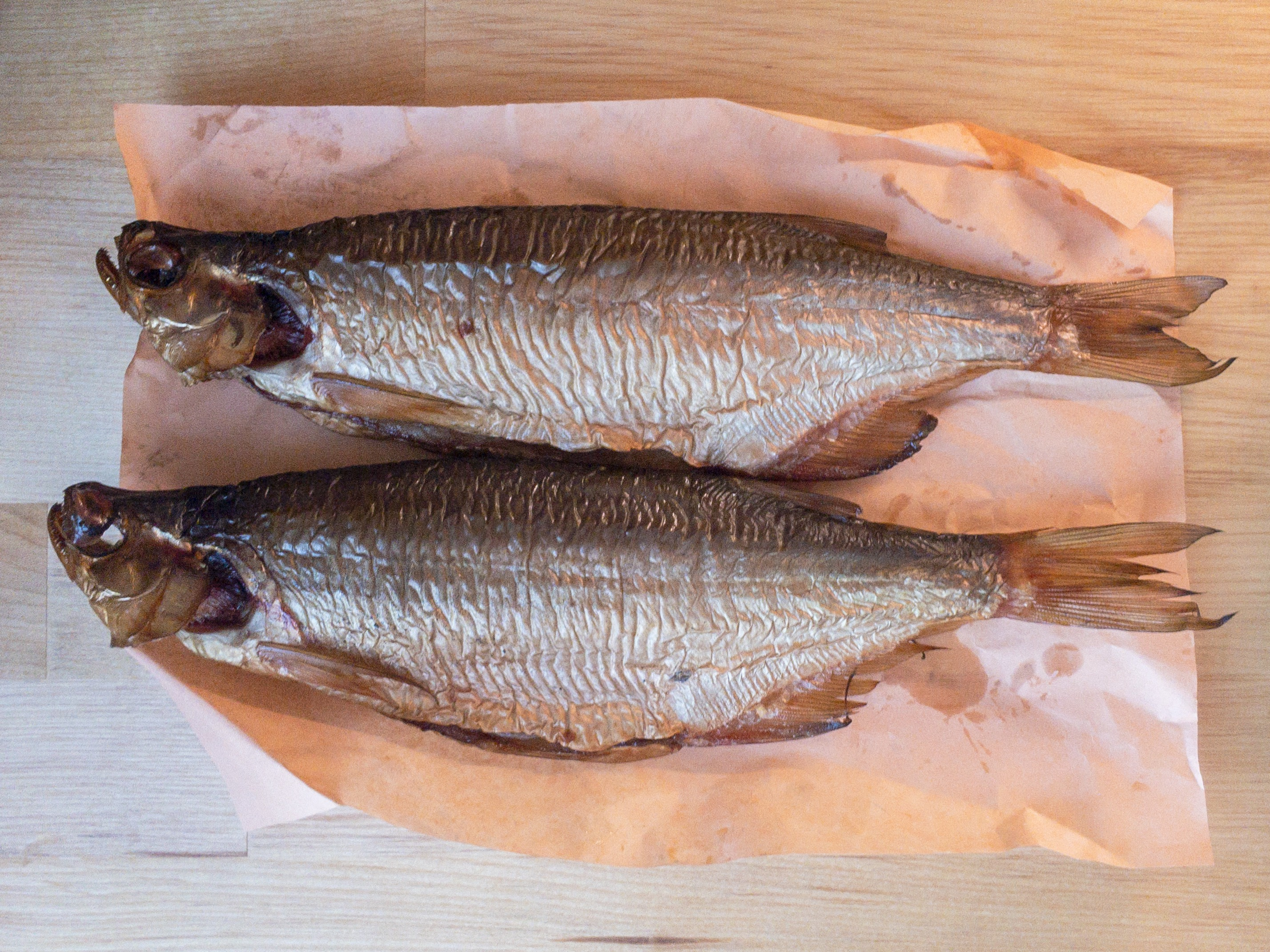
Winnipeg goldeye

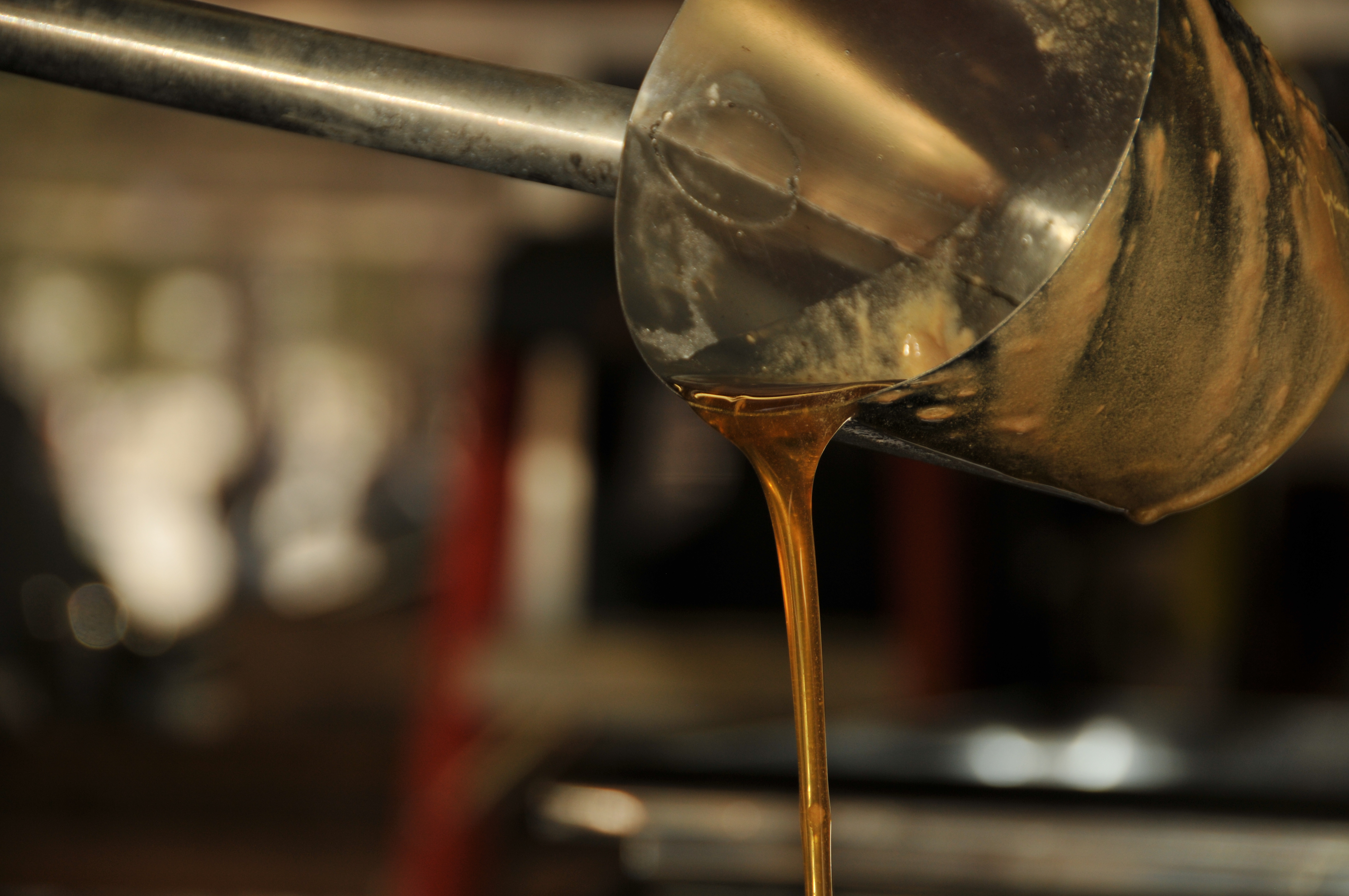
Ontario maple syrup

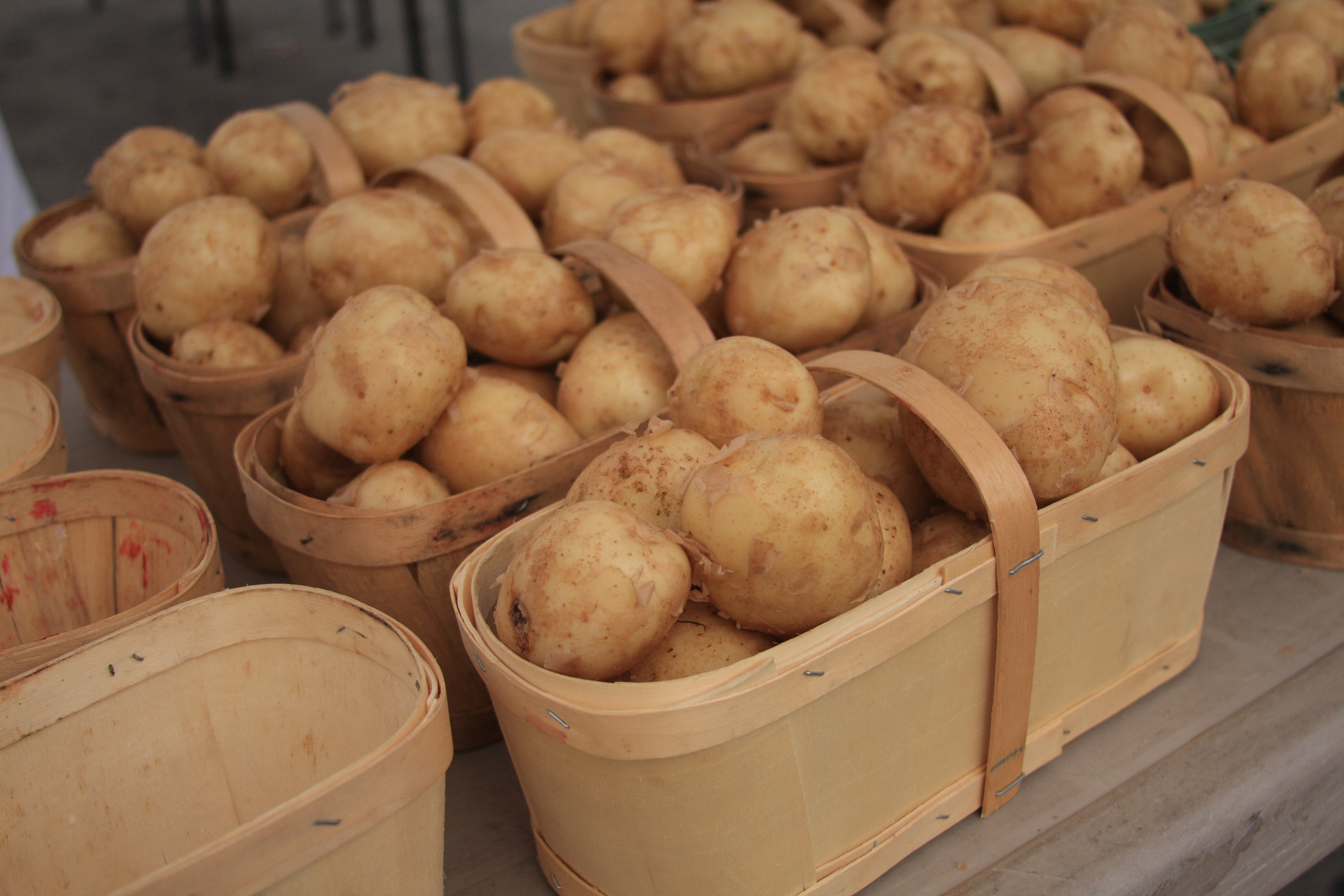
Potatoes from Port Credit Farmers' Market

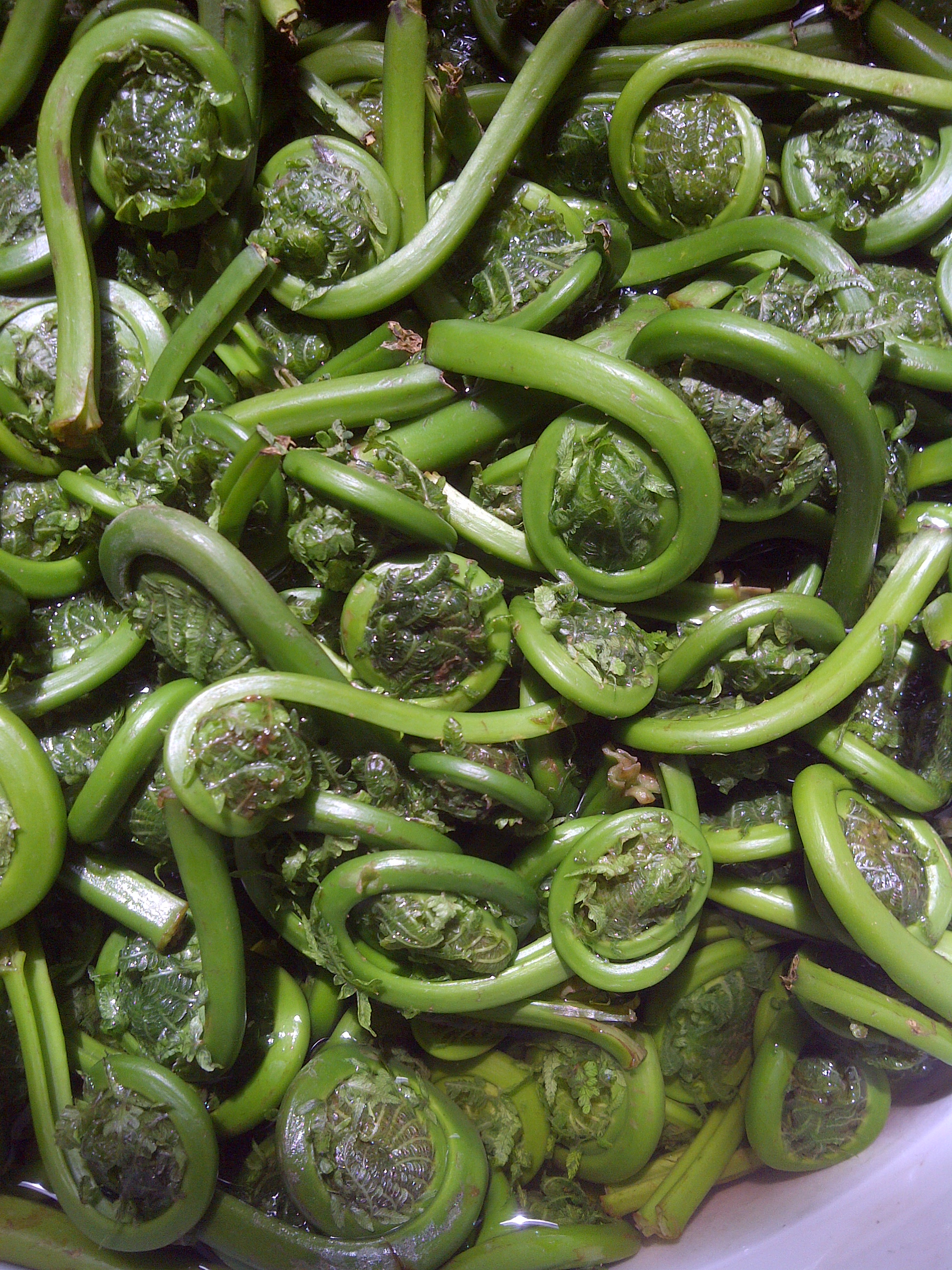
New Brunswick fiddleheads

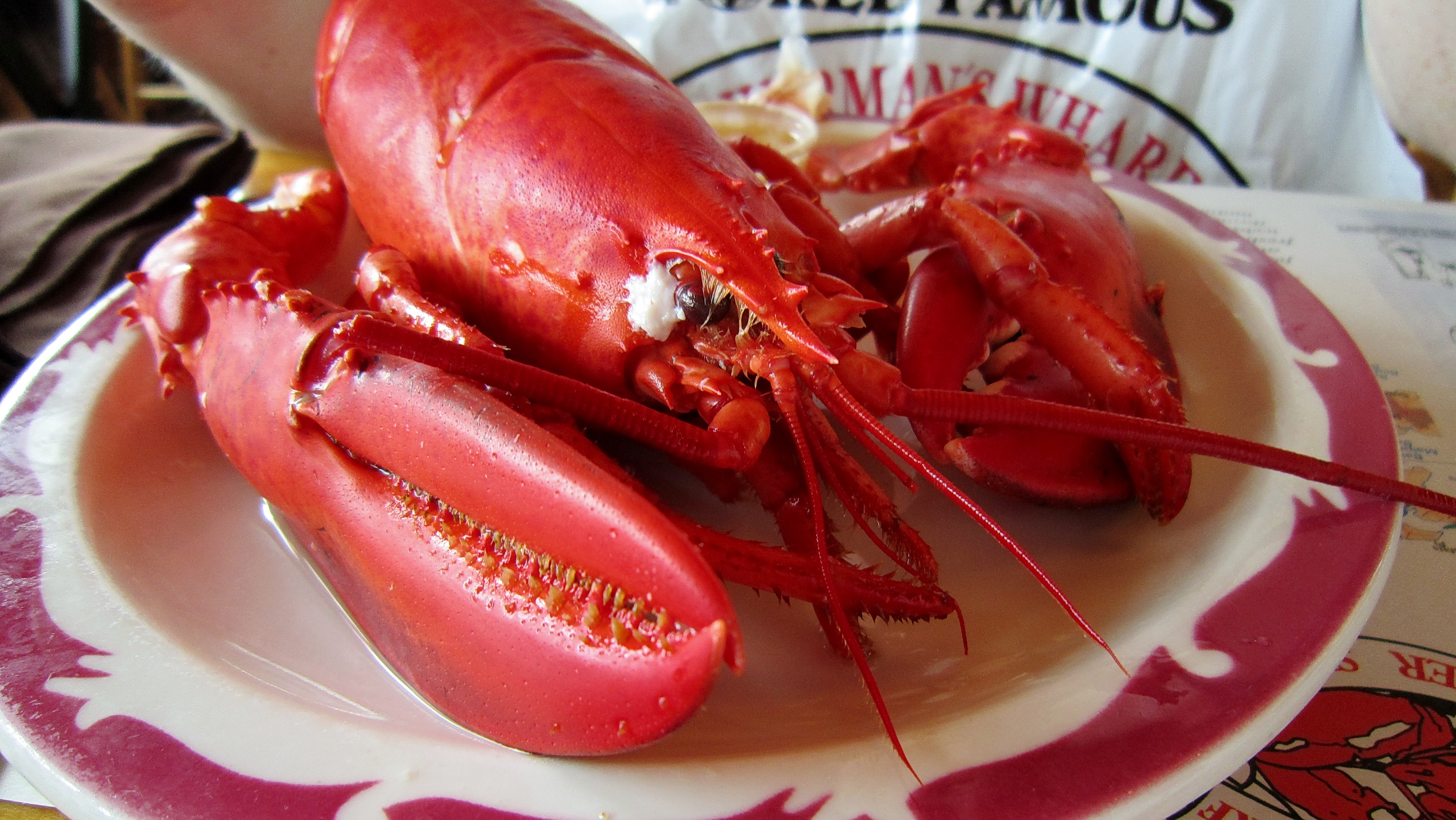
Atlantic lobster (P.E.I.)

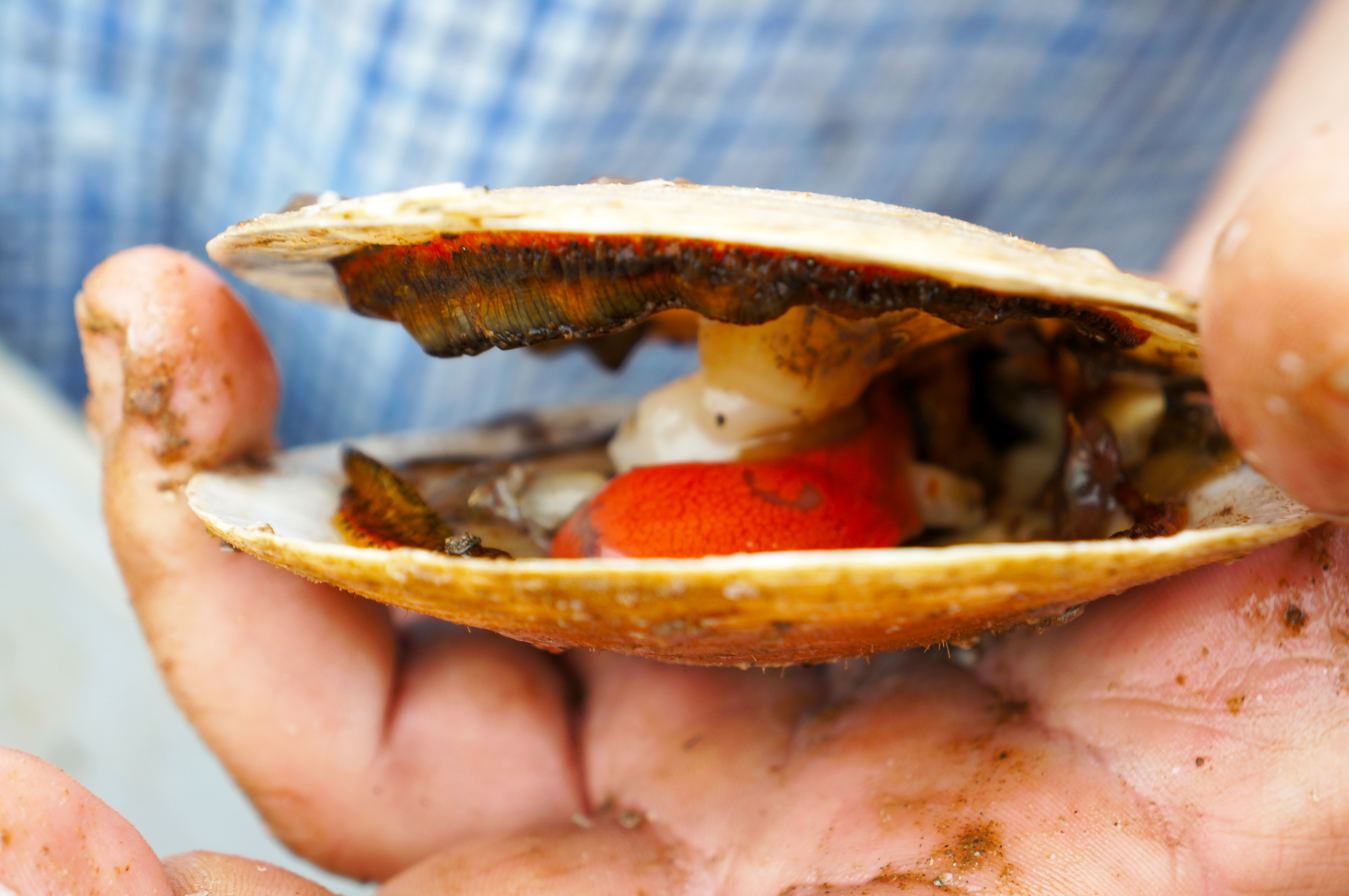
Digby scallop (Nova Scotia)

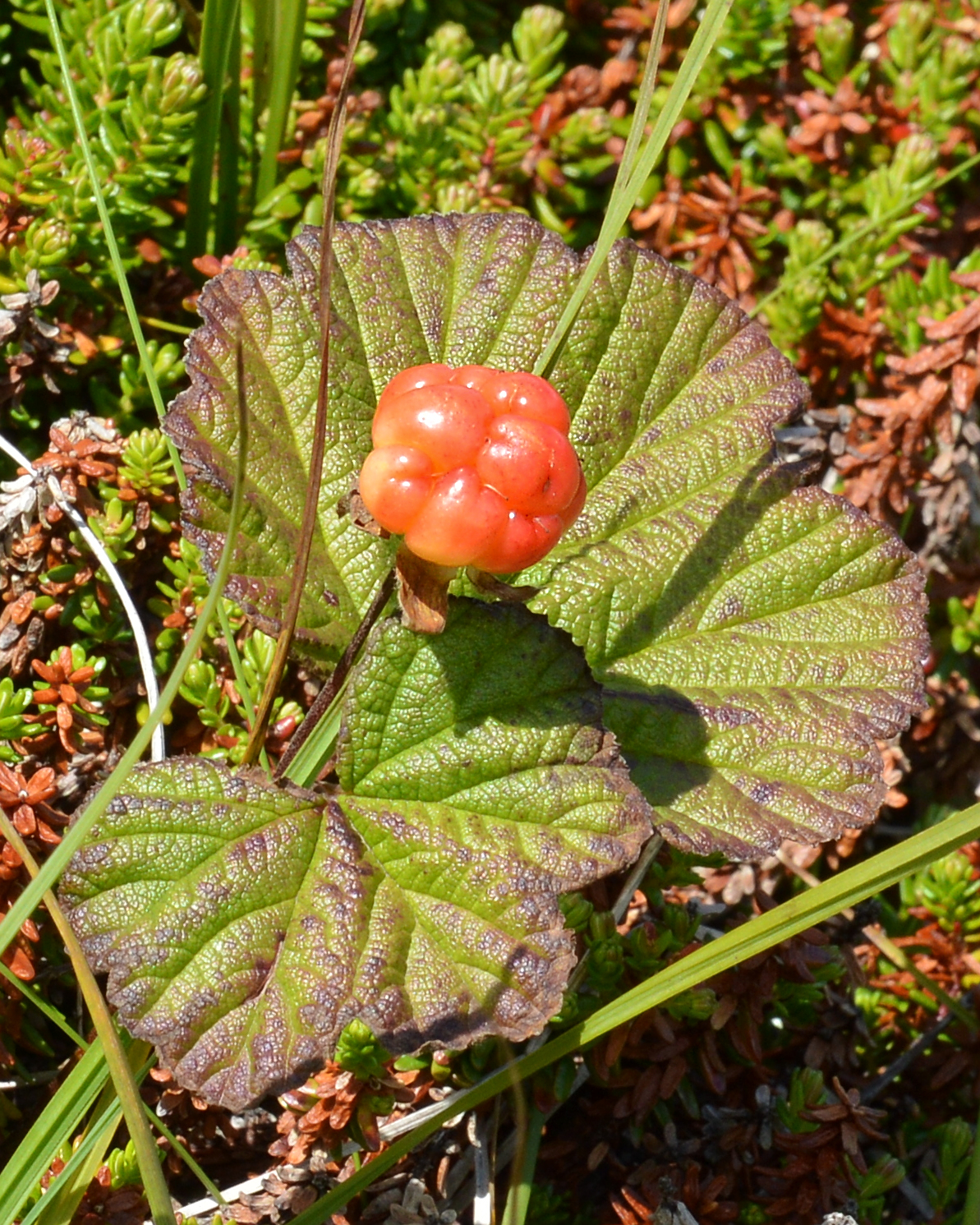
Newfoundland cloudberry

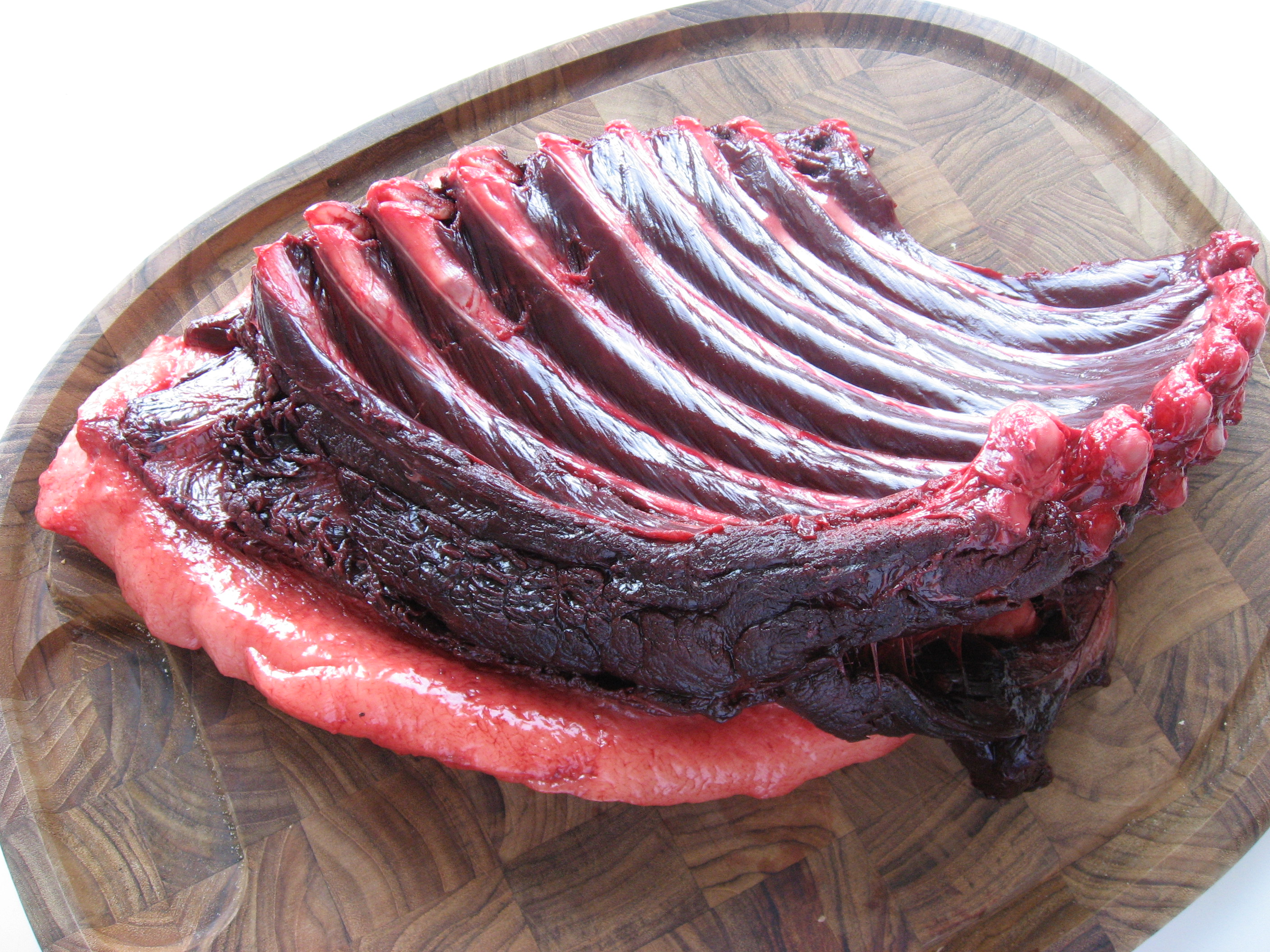
Arctic harp seal

Wild game of all sorts is still hunted and eaten by many Canadians, though not commonly in urban centres. Venison, from white-tailed deer, moose, elk (wapiti) or caribou, is eaten across the country and is considered quite important to many First Nations cultures. Seal meat is eaten, particularly in the Canadian North, the Maritimes, and Newfoundland and Labrador. Wild fowl like ducks and geese, grouse (commonly called partridge) and ptarmigan are also regularly hunted. Other animals like bear and beaver may be eaten by dedicated hunters or indigenous people, but are not generally consumed by much of the population.

Seafood is a very common constituent of Canadian cuisine broadly, but particularly in British Columbia and the Atlantic provinces. West Coast salmon varieties include sockeye, coho, chinook (also known as king), chum (also known as dog salmon), and pink, while salmon used on the East Coast can be broadly defined as Atlantic salmon. Freshwater fish, such as the walleye (also known as pickerel) and lake whitefish are commercially fished in the Great Lakes and are popular in southern Ontario. Both wild-caught and farmed rainbow trout are consumed throughout Canada.

Although the majority of Canada's fish yield is captured wild, about 28% of the country's yield came from aquaculture in 2018. British Columbia accounts for 49% of the country's total aquaculture production volume, while the Maritime provinces account for 46%. Canada is the world's fourth-largest producer of farmed salmon, and other species, such as trout, Arctic char, mussels, oysters, and clams are well established industries.

Forage in Canadian cooking can include a variety of berries, mushrooms, Canada rice and herbs. Wild chanterelle, pine, morel, lobster, puffball, and other mushrooms are commonly consumed. Gooseberries, salmonberries, cranberries, strawberries, Saskatoon berries, cloudberries, soapberries, blackberries, blueberries, bilberries, currants, and huckleberries are gathered wild or grown.

Alberta is renowned for its production of beef; in 2016, Alberta's cattle herd accounted for 41.6% of the national total. Alberta beef is thought to have a rich marbled flavour due to the province's nutritious grasslands and barley. Examples of local recipes that utilize Alberta beef include beef tartare, bistecca, roast beef, Sunday roast, short ribs, ginger-fried beef, and grilled steak. Canada ranks among the world's top 10 per capita consumers of beef.

Saskatchewan is often referred to as the "breadbasket of Canada"; it accounts for nearly 50% of Canada's total crop yield and for two-fifths of the country's total field acreage. In 2016, canola and spring wheat were the two largest crops, Saskatoon berries accounted for over half of the "fruit, berry and nut area", and sweet corn was the largest field vegetable crop by area. Saskatchewan also produces most of the country's spice yield, particularly mustard, but also caraway and coriander.

== Canadian foods ==
=== Main dishes, side dishes and appetizers ===
Although there are considerable overlaps between Canadian culinary practices and those of the British Isles, France and the rest of North America, many dishes (or variations of imported dishes) are particular to, quintessential of, or available only in Canada.

==== Breads ====
Dishes by region ("O" = originating and "X" = found)
Dish	Description	Pacific	Mountain	Prairies	Ontario	Quebec	Atlantic	Northern	Inherited (from outside Canada)
Canadian-style johnnycake	Sweet and salty cornmeal cake topped with maple syrup and butter. Consists of pastry flour, shortening, and brown sugar.	X	X	X	X	X	O		
Montreal-style bagels	Sweet, firm, wood-fired bagel.	X			X	O			
Pancakes (Canadian)	Made from a starchy batter of whole-wheat flour, baking soda, sugar, eggs, milk, and butter; adapted from the German Pfannkuchen. It is a particularly fluffy pancake due to the folding and beating method required in preparing the mixture. Maple syrup and fruit are common toppings.	X	X	X	X	X	X	X	O
Ploye	Flatbread made of a buckwheat flour, wheat flour, baking powder and water mix. Often served with maple syrup, cretons, or beans.						O		
Touton	Fried bread dish from Newfoundland.						O		

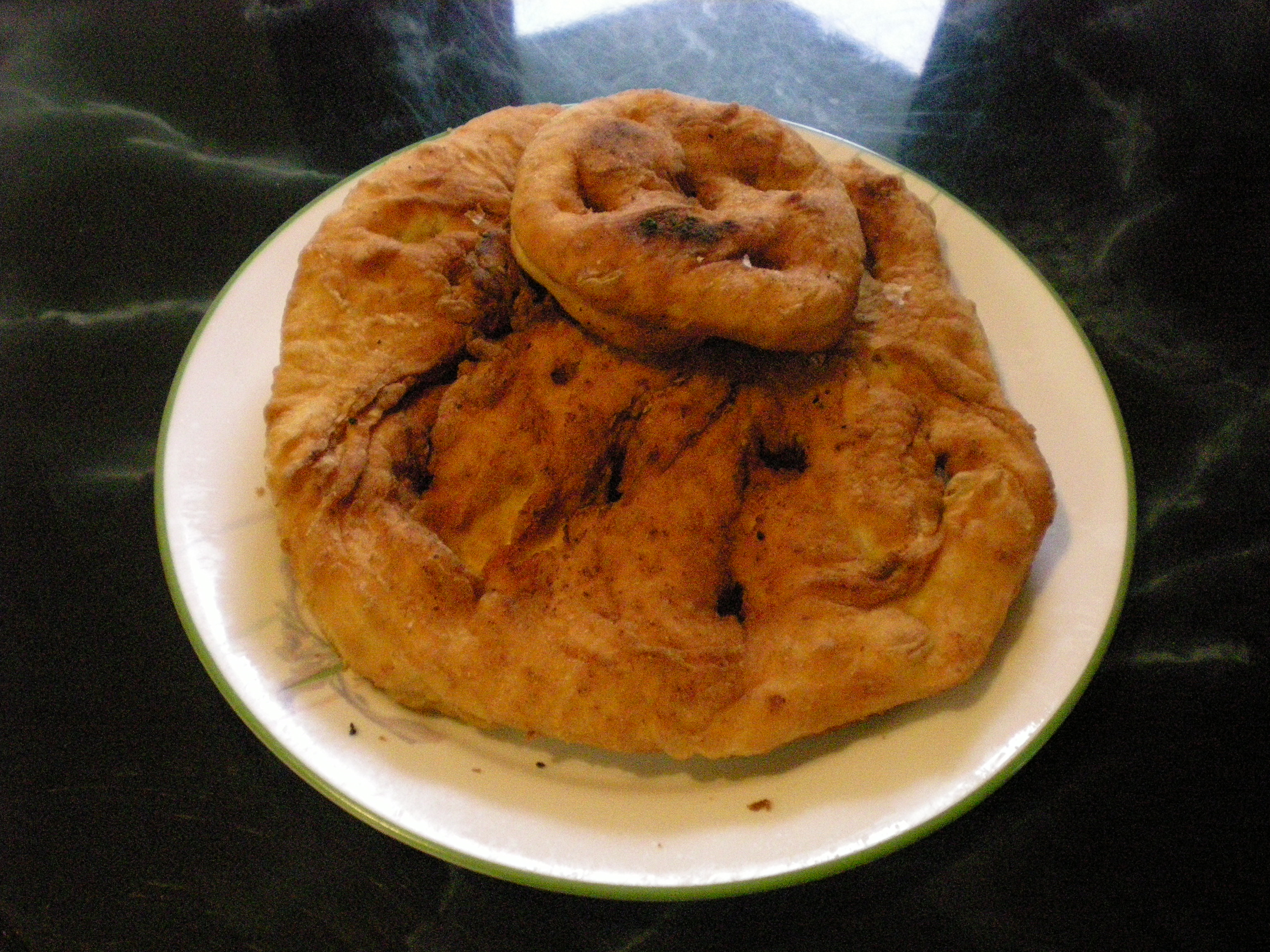
Inuit bannock fried bread

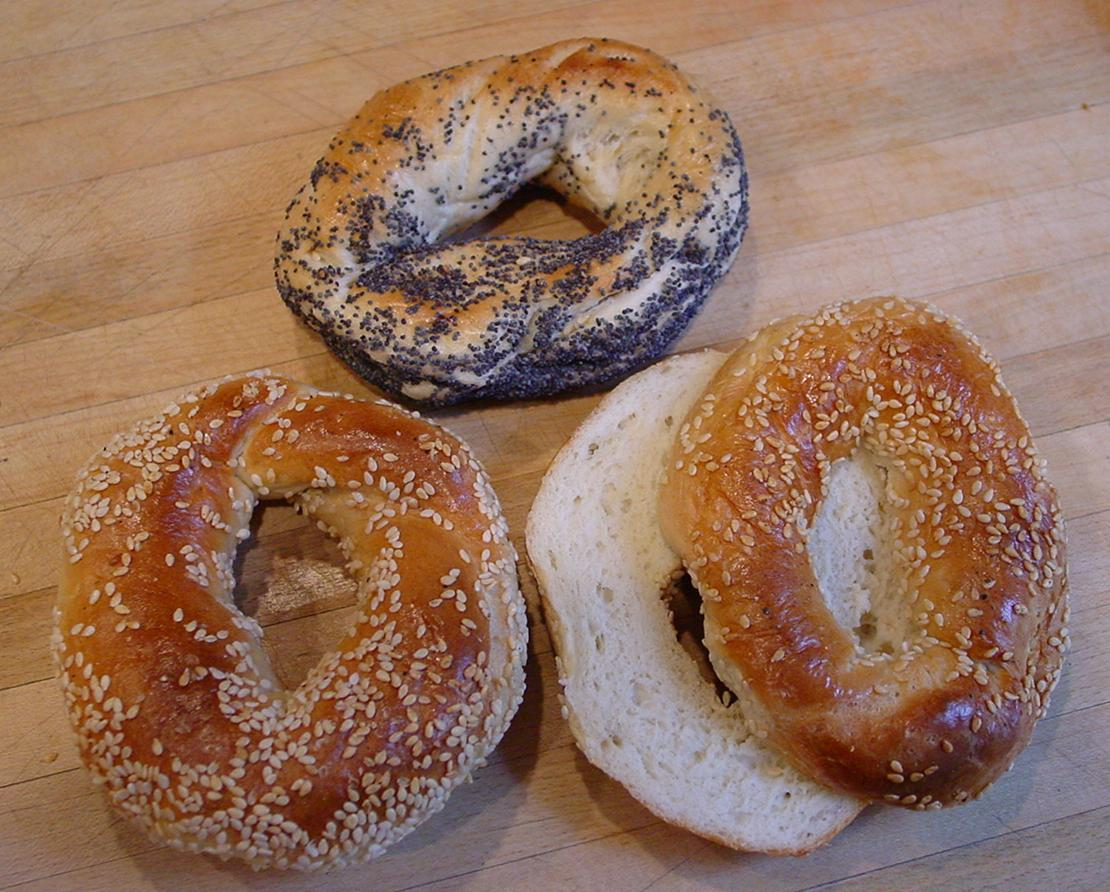
Montreal-style bagels

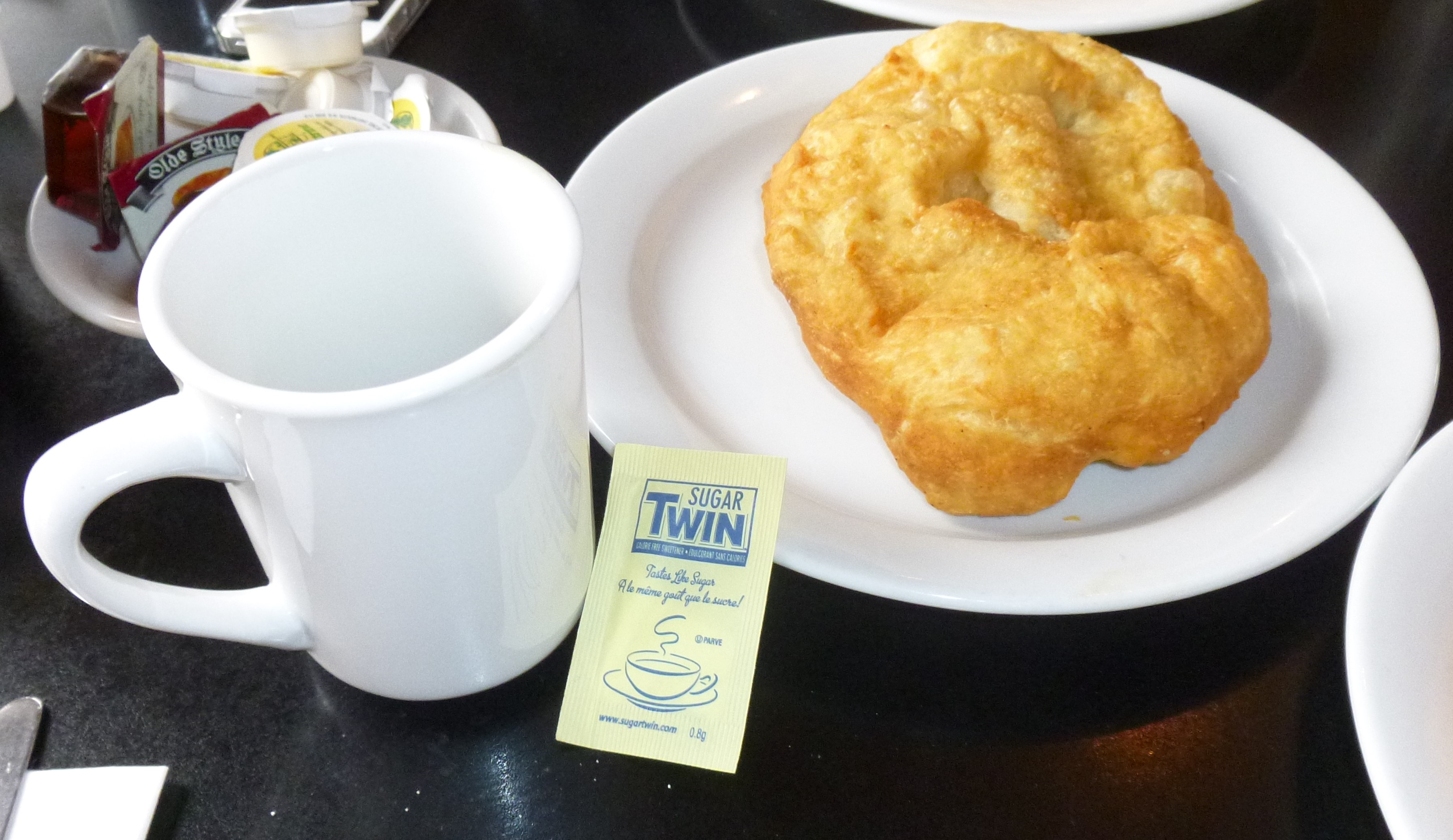
Newfoundland's "touton" has a multitude of alternative names

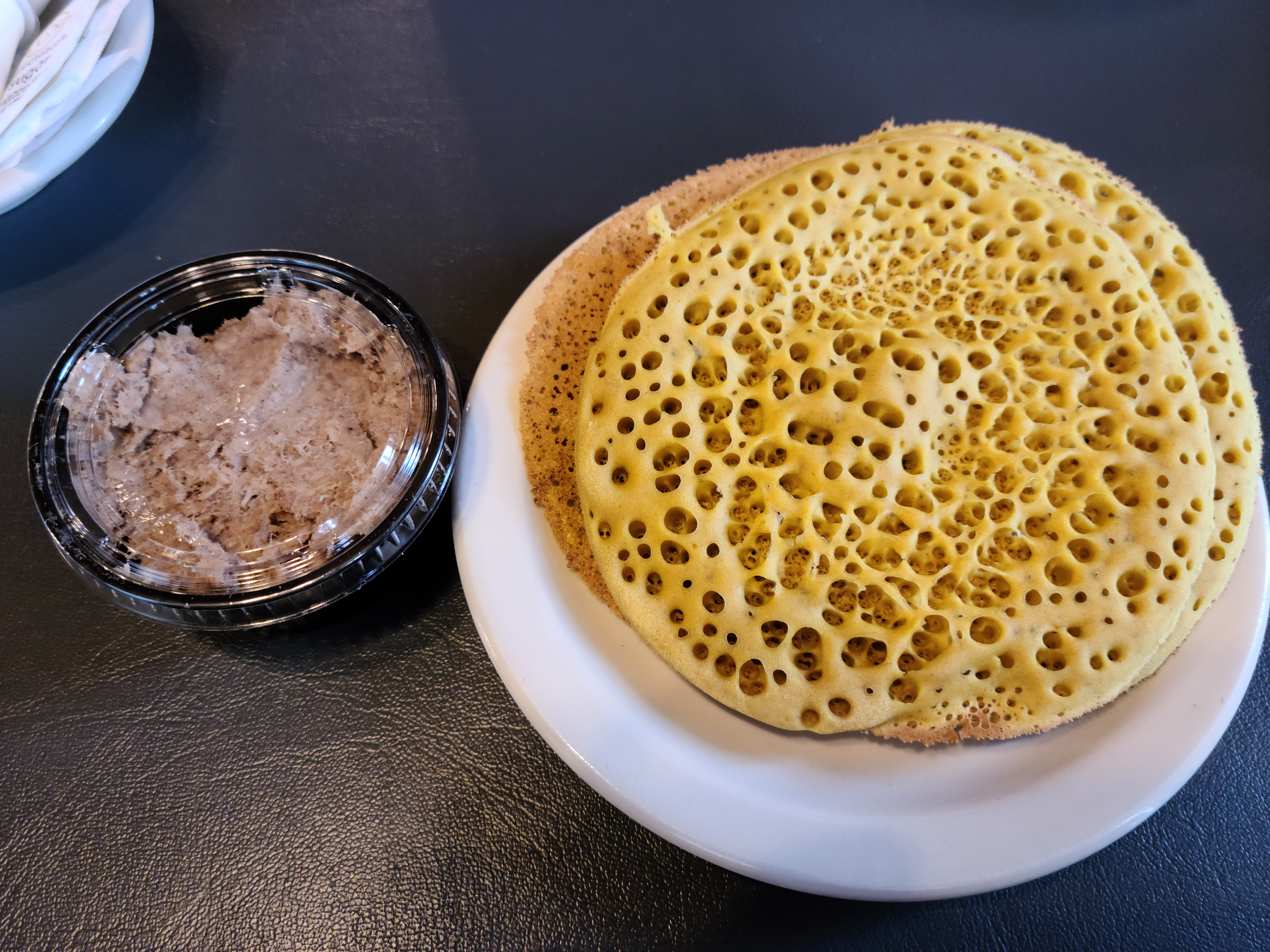
Ploye stack

==== Miscellaneous ====
Dishes by region ("O" = originating and "X" = found)
Dish	Description	Pacific	Mountain	Prairies	Ontario	Quebec	Atlantic	Northern	Inherited
Back or peameal bacon (i.e. Canadian bacon)	Wet-cured, unsmoked back bacon made from trimmed lean boneless pork loin rolled in cornmeal.	X	X	X	O	X	X	X	
Baked beans	Beans cooked with maple syrup or molasses.	X	X	X	X	X	X		O
Bouilli	Québécois beef and vegetable pot roast.					O			
Calgary-style ginger beef	Candied and deep fried beef, with sweet ginger sauce.	X	O	X					
Fried macaroni	Stir-fried pasta with soy sauce, meat, and vegetables.					O			
Halifax donair	Ground beef donair kebab served with a sweet milk sauce; a variation is common in Quebec patateries, known simply as a souvlaki pita.		X	X	X	X	O		
Hot chicken sandwich	Chicken (or turkey) sandwich doused in gravy and peas.	X	X	X	X	X	X		O
Hot hamburger sandwich	Hamburger patty between sliced bread doused in gravy, popularized by the former Zellers Family Restaurant; a variation is the Italian Hamburger with tomato sauce.	X	X	X	O	X	X	X	
Japadog	Vancouver street food; hot dog-style sausage and bun served with various Japanese-inspired toppings, such as okonomiyaki, yakisoba, teriyaki and tonkatsu.	O							
Jellied moose nose	Similar to European head cheese; made with a combination of boiled and sliced moose nose meat (dark meat around the bones and white meat from the bulb of the nose), garlic, onions, salt, pepper, vinegar, and spices such as cloves, mustard seeds, cinnamon, or allspice. It is then cooled and refrigerated until solidified. Served as a loaf cut into slices.							O	
Jiggs dinner	Sunday meal similar to the New England boiled dinner.						O		
Kubie burger	Hamburger consisting of a Ukrainian garlic sausage, referred to as "kubie", that is pressed and then served in a bun or bread roll. Name comes from the Albertan abbreviation of the word "kubasa", which is the corrupted name for kovbasa, meaning "sausage" in Ukrainian.		X	O					
London broil	Ground meat, pork sausage, or minced veal wrapped in a butterflied and tenderized flank or round steak.			X	O	X			
Maple slaw	Canadian version of coleslaw, consisting of cabbage, onions, maple syrup, and seasonings. Variations include apple cider vinegar, celery seeds, mayonnaise, cheese, cereals, and chocolate. Served as salad, dessert or snack, or condiment for burgers and sandwiches.	X	X	X	X	X	X	X	
Mashed potatoes (instant)	Cooked, mashed, and dehydrated potatoes that are reconstituted by adding hot water or milk	X	X	X	O	X	X	X	
Montreal-style smoked meat	Deli-style cured beef, developed by Jewish-Canadian delicatessen purveyors in Montreal.	X	X	X	X	O	X		
Newfoundland chow mein	Made with cabbage instead of egg noodles, as typical.						O		
Oreilles de crisse	Deep-fried pork skin and fat.					O			
Pasty	Cornish pastry dish commonly made in English Canada and served in an informal setting. Usually contains beef, potatoes, game, corn, peas, or carrots.	X	X	X	X	X	X		O
Pâté Chinois	Variation of shepherd's pie developed by Chinese railway workers; comfort food consisting of layers of ground beef, corn, and mashed potatoes.					O	X		
Pemmican	Ground dried meat, fat, and berries.			O				X	
Pierogi	Dumplings introduced, and made ubiquitous, to the Prairies by Ukrainian and Polish immigrants. Canadian variations often include cheddar cheese.	X	X	X	X				O
Poutine	French fries topped with cheese curds and gravy.	X	X	X	X	O	X	X	
Poutine râpée	Stuffed grated potato dumpling.						O		
Rappie pie	Grated potato and meat casserole.						O		
Roast beef and Yorkshire pudding	Traditional Sunday dinner, reflective of Canada's British heritage.	X	X	X	X	X	X		O
Roast turkey	North American roasted turkey, often cooked with stuffing and eaten with gravy.	X	X	X	O	X	X		
Sausage roll	Commonwealth food commonly found throughout Canada. Typically viewed in Canada as a utilitarian snack, and can include marjoram, summer savoury, and dijon mustard.	X	X	X	X	X	X	X	O
Thunder Bay bon bons	Deep-fried ribs.				O				
Tourtière	A meat pie made of pork and lard.	X	X	X	X	O	X		

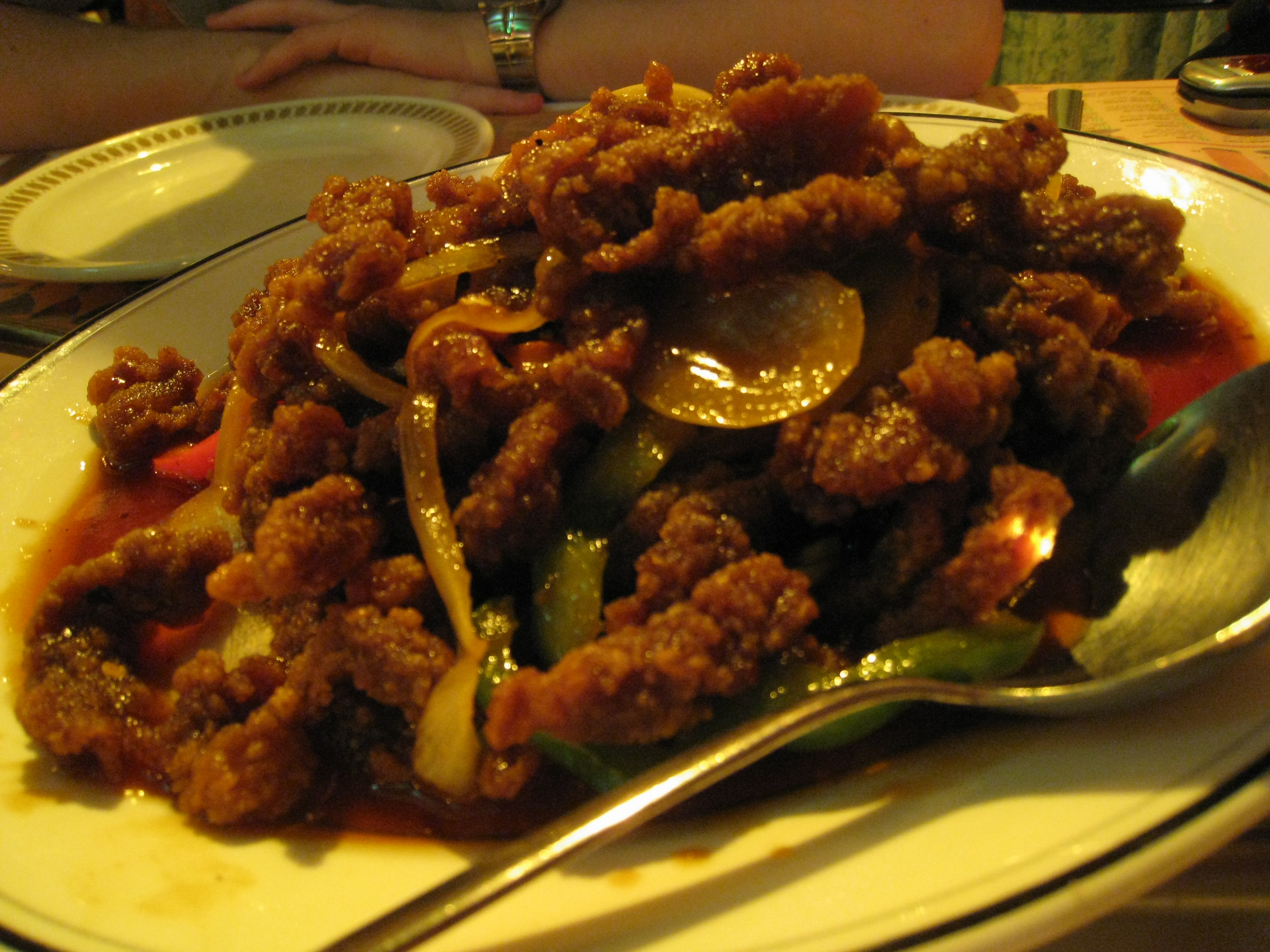
Calgary-style ginger beef

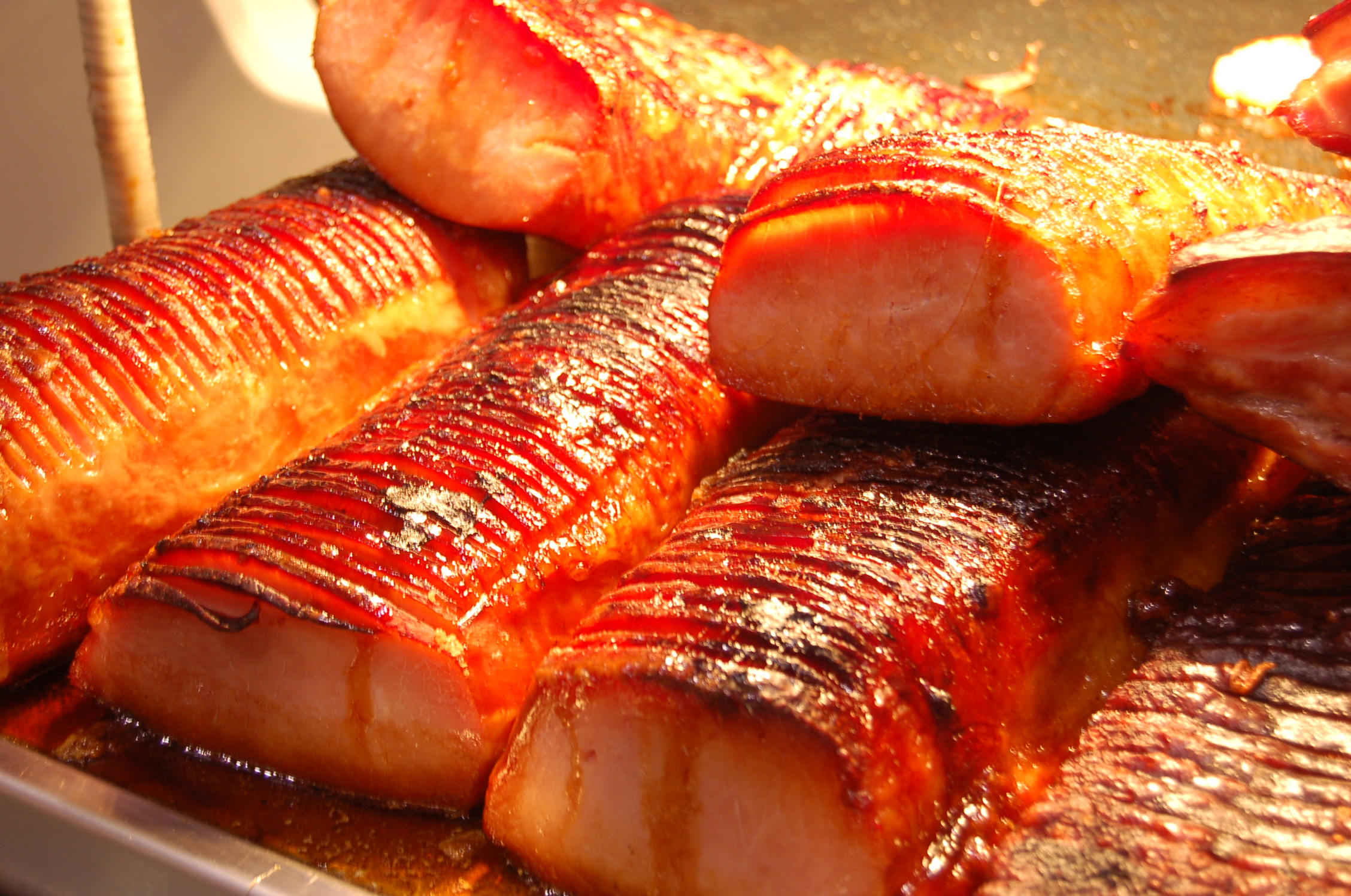
Canadian "peameal" bacon

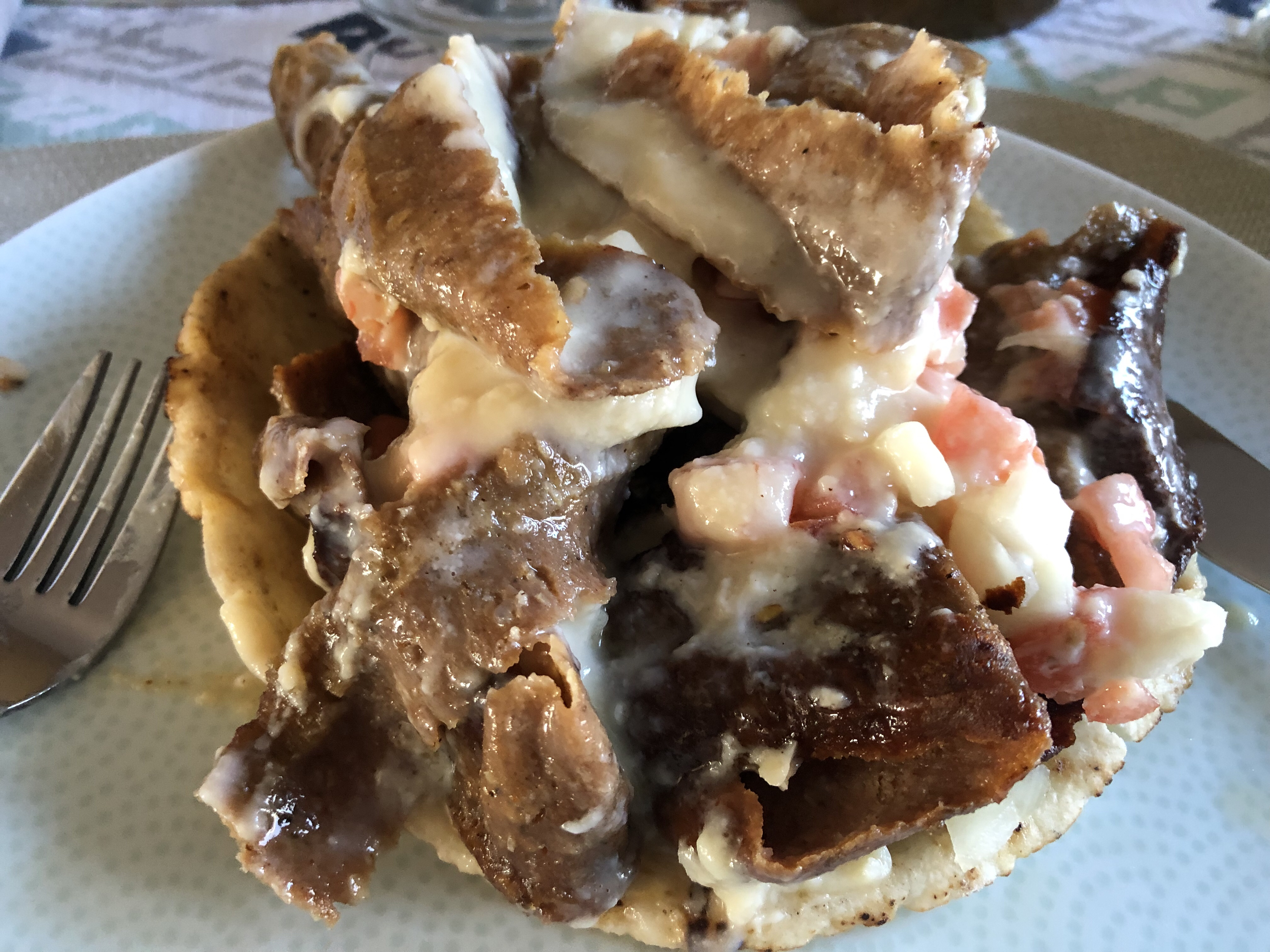
Halifax donair

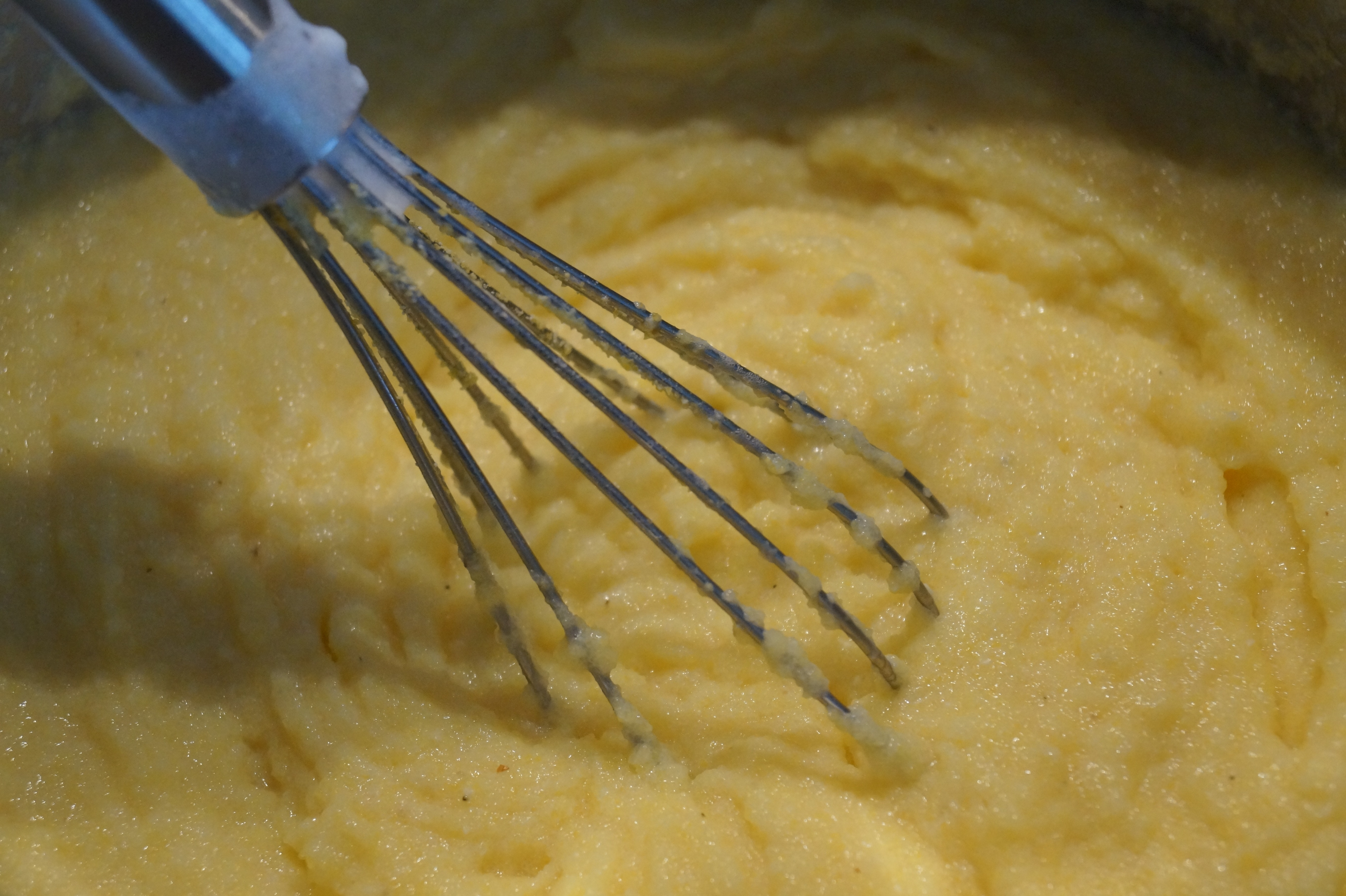
Instant mashed potatoes

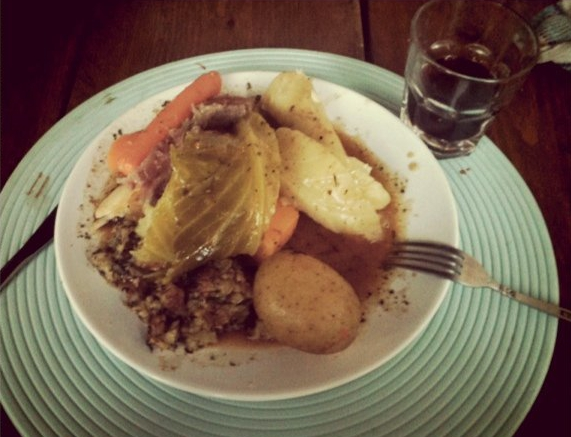
Jiggs dinner

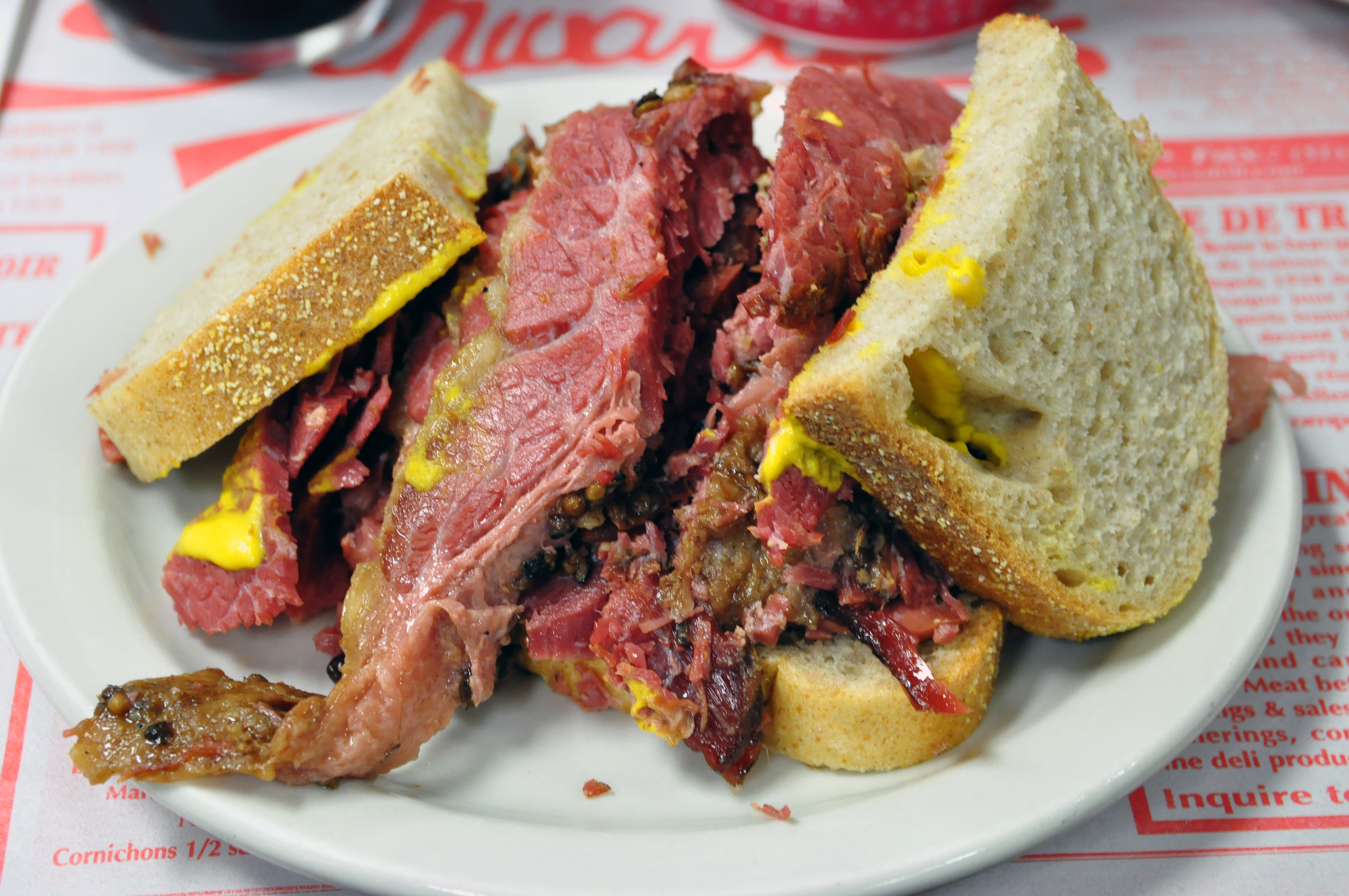
Montreal smoked meat sandwich

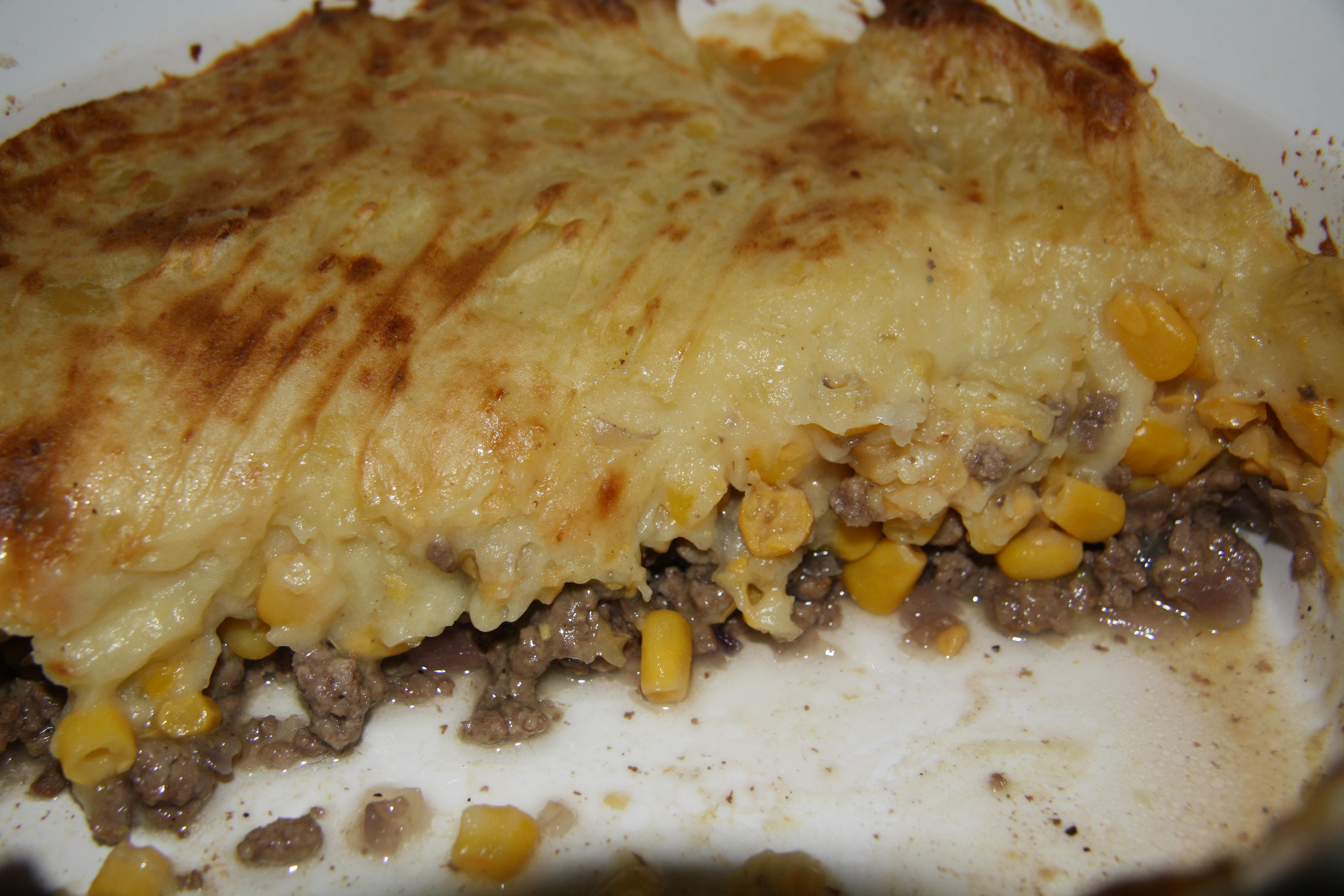
Pâté Chinois

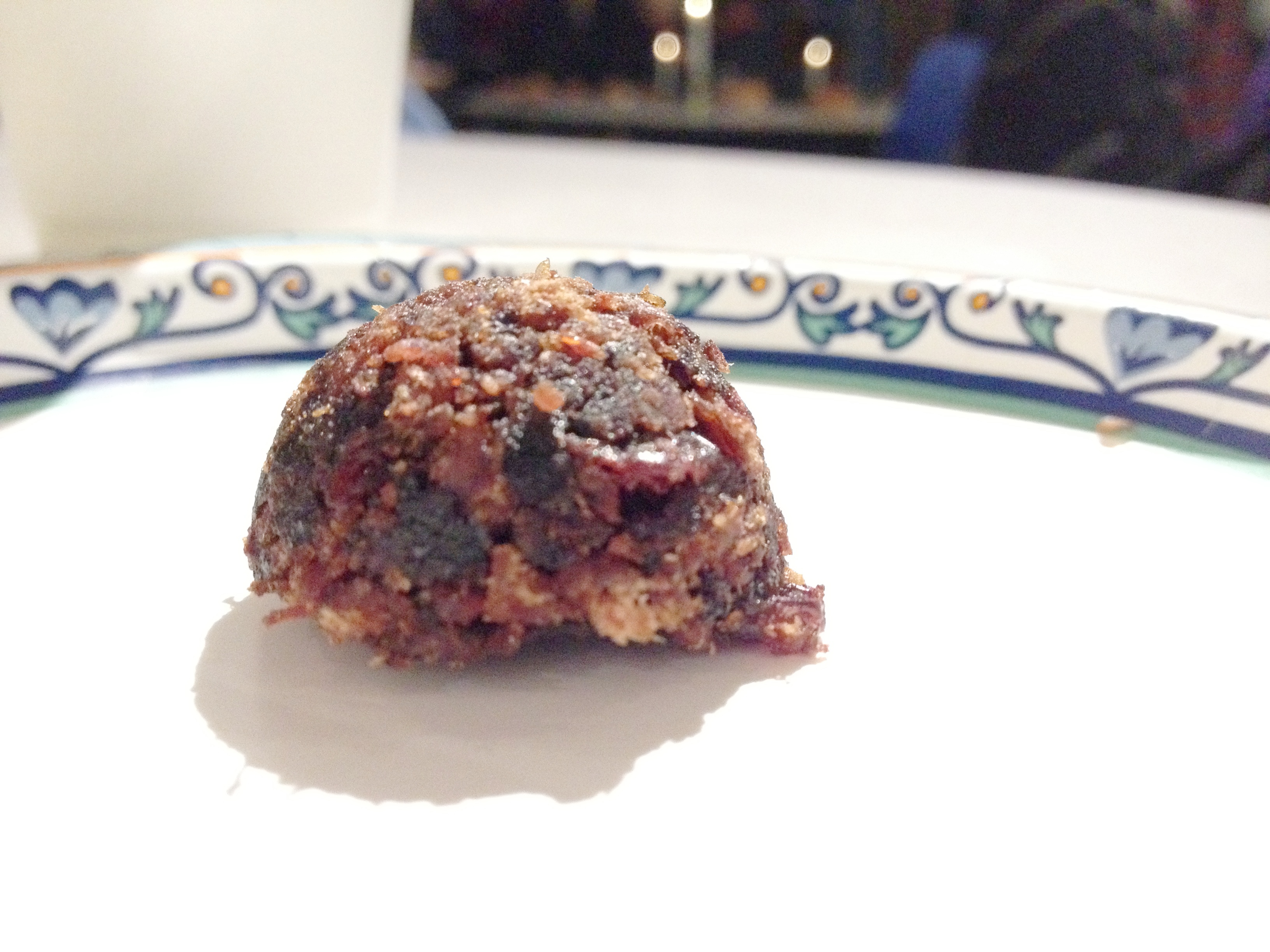
Pemmican ball

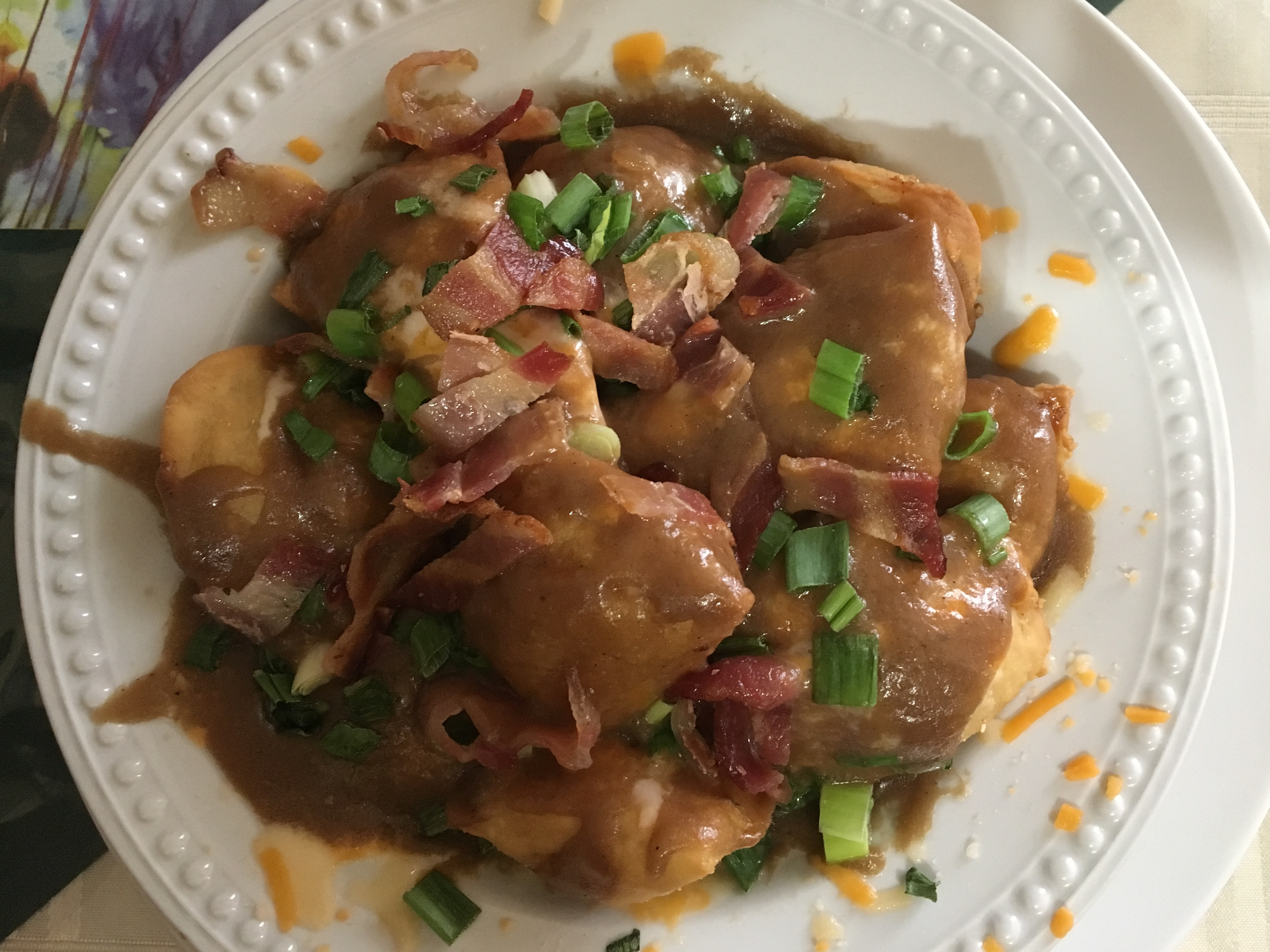
"Pierogi poutine", a fusion of Quebec and Prairie cuisine

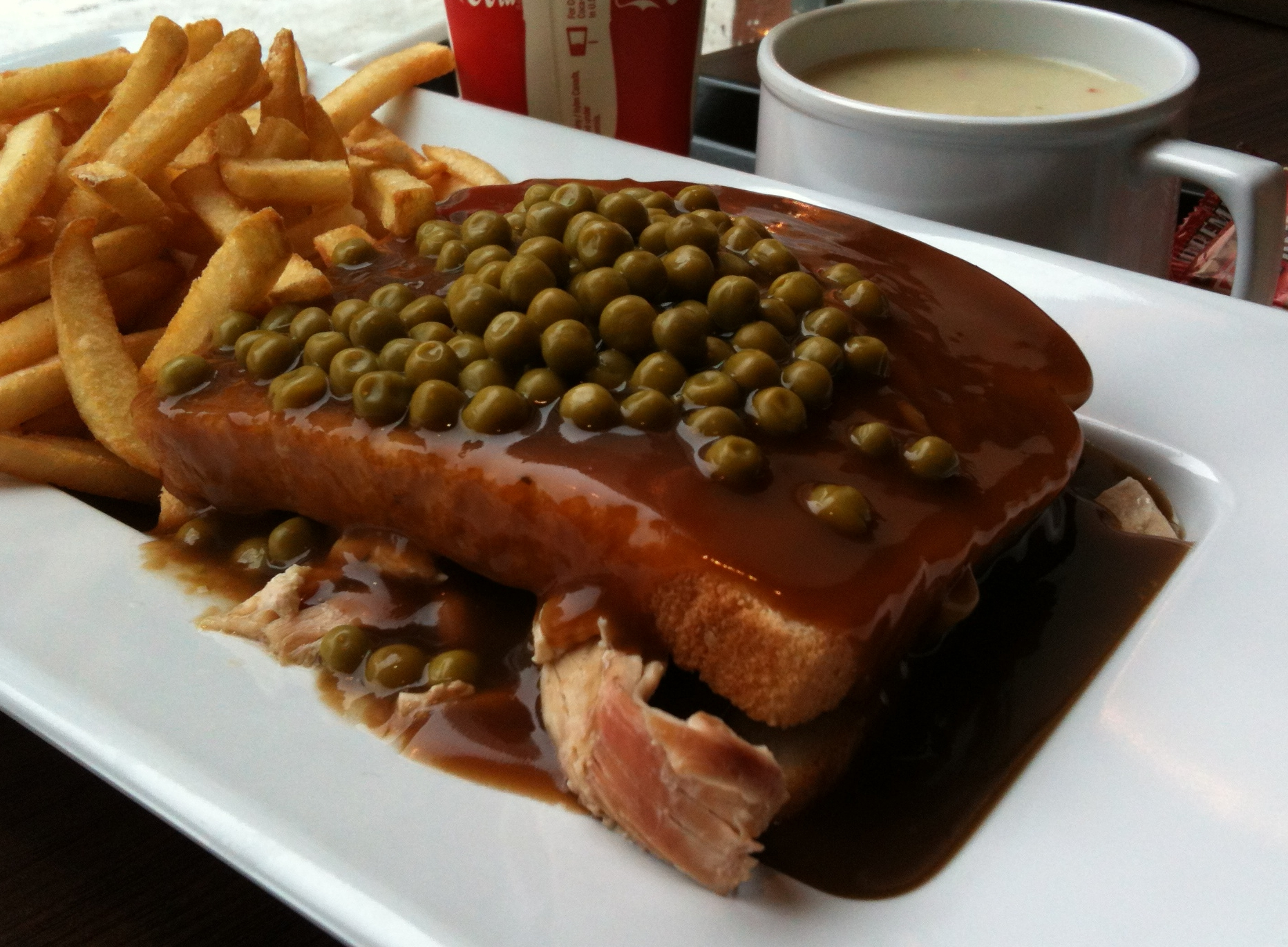
Quebec-style "hot chicken", topped with green peas

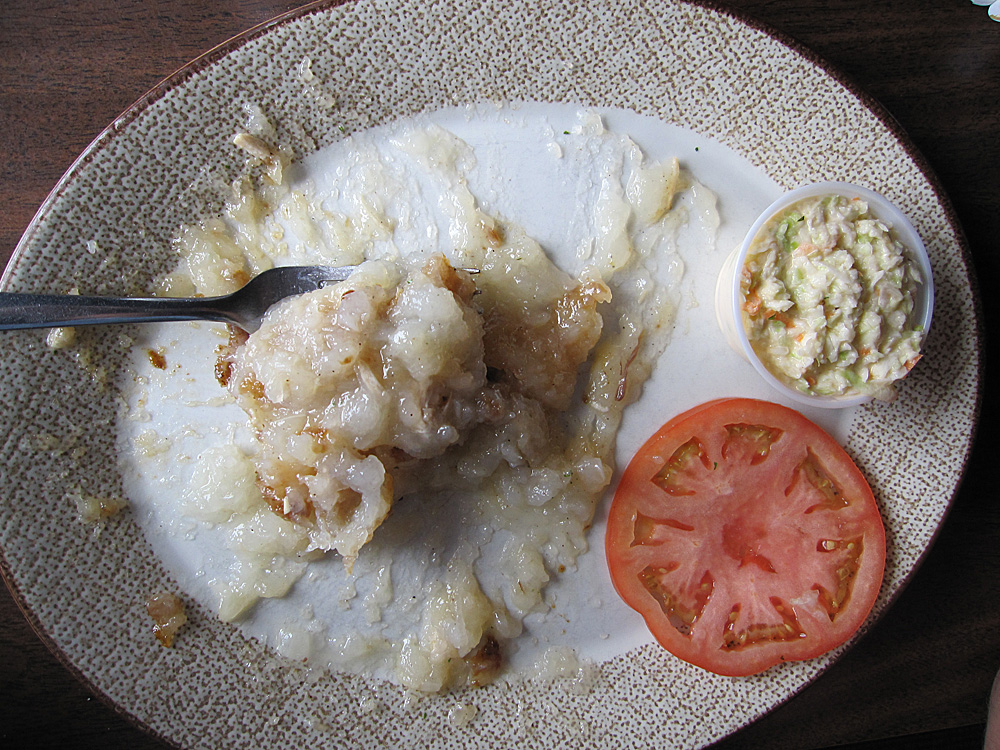
Rappie pie: grated potatoes and meat casserole

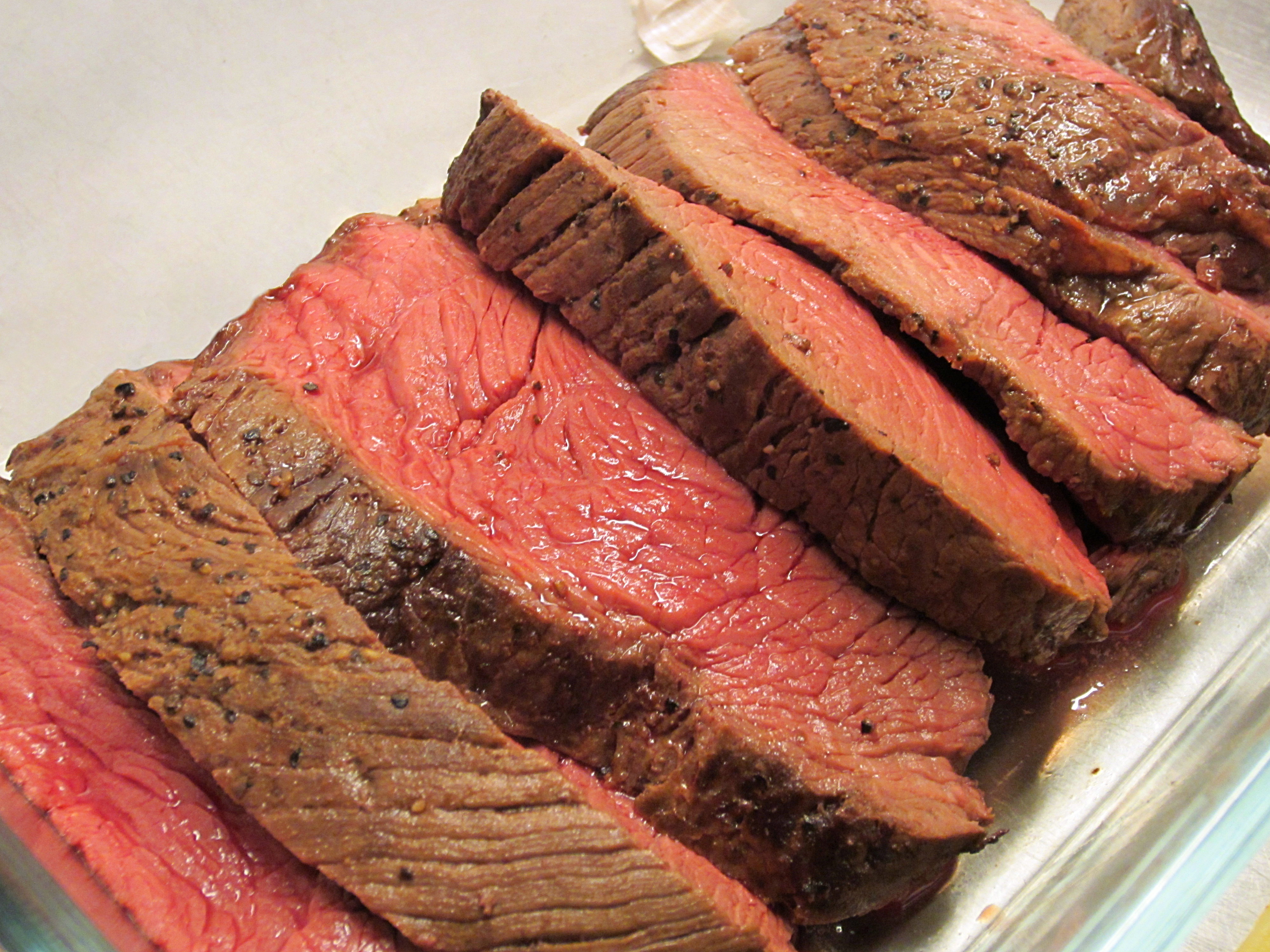
Roast beef, a traditional main dish adopted from England

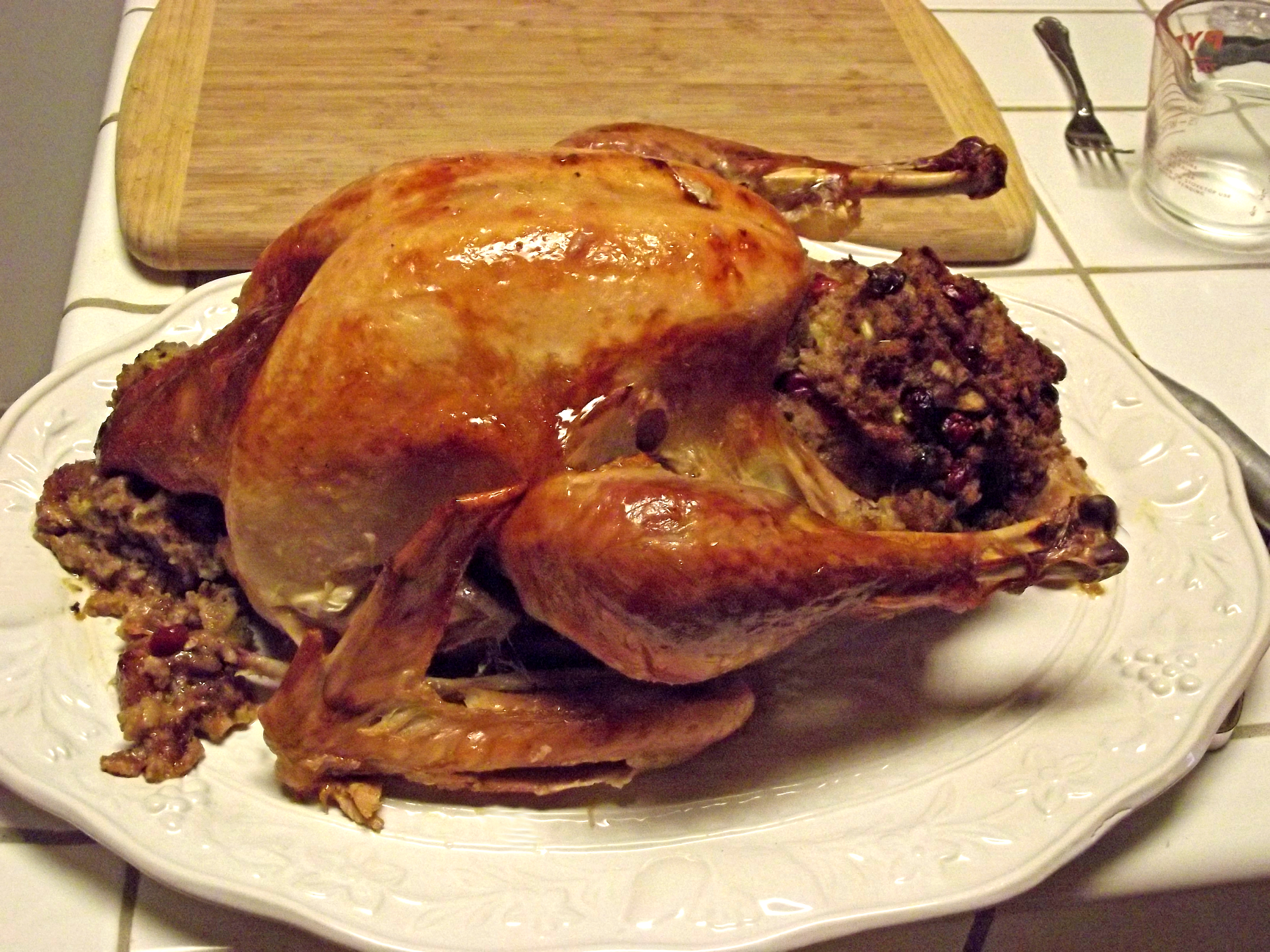
Roast turkey with stuffing

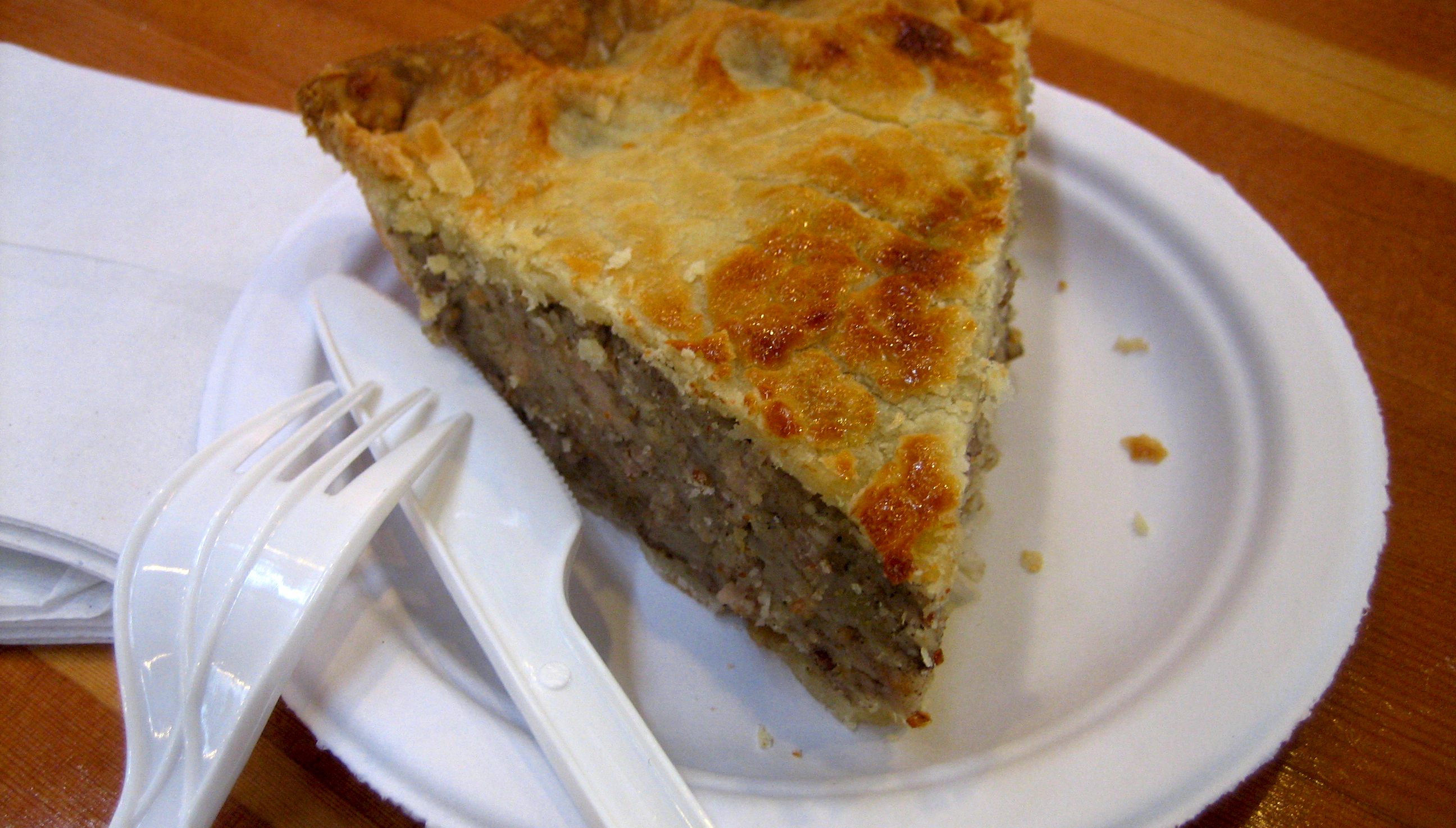
Tourtière from Granville Island Public Market

==== Pizza ====
Dishes by region ("O" = originating and "X" = found)
Dish	Description	Pacific	Mountain	Prairies	Ontario	Quebec	Atlantic	Northern	Inherited
Canadian pizza	Typically includes tomato sauce, mozzarella cheese, bacon and mushrooms; variations exist.	X	X	X	X	X	X	X	
Garlic fingers	Baked pizza dough with cheese, garlic, and sometimes meat on top.	X	X	X	X	X	O		
Hawaiian pizza	Signature ingredient is pineapple, and typically includes either bacon or ham; originates from Ontario, despite the name.	X	X	X	O	X	X	X	
Indian-style pizza	Punjabi-Canadian fusion pizza originating in Greater Vancouver, including sauce with mixed spices and toppings such as coriander, ginger, spinach, cauliflower, tandoori chicken, butter chicken, or paneer.	O	X	X	X				
Pictou County pizza	Regional variant from Nova Scotia, noted particularly for its unique sauce.						O		
Pizza-ghetti	Combination dish consisting of pizza with a side of spaghetti.				X	O			
Sushi pizza	Fusion dish with fried rice patty as base and topped with a layer of sliced avocado, a layer of sliced salmon, tuna or crab meat, and a drizzle of blended mayonnaise and wasabi powder. Served in wedges.	X	X	X	O	X	X		
Windsor pizza	Has a medium-thin crust, most often topped with oregano-spiked tomato sauce, mozzarella cheese produced by Galati, canned mushrooms, and sticks of shredded pepperoni. Toppings are traditionally placed overtop of the cheese. Cooked on cornmeal on stone deck ovens.				O				

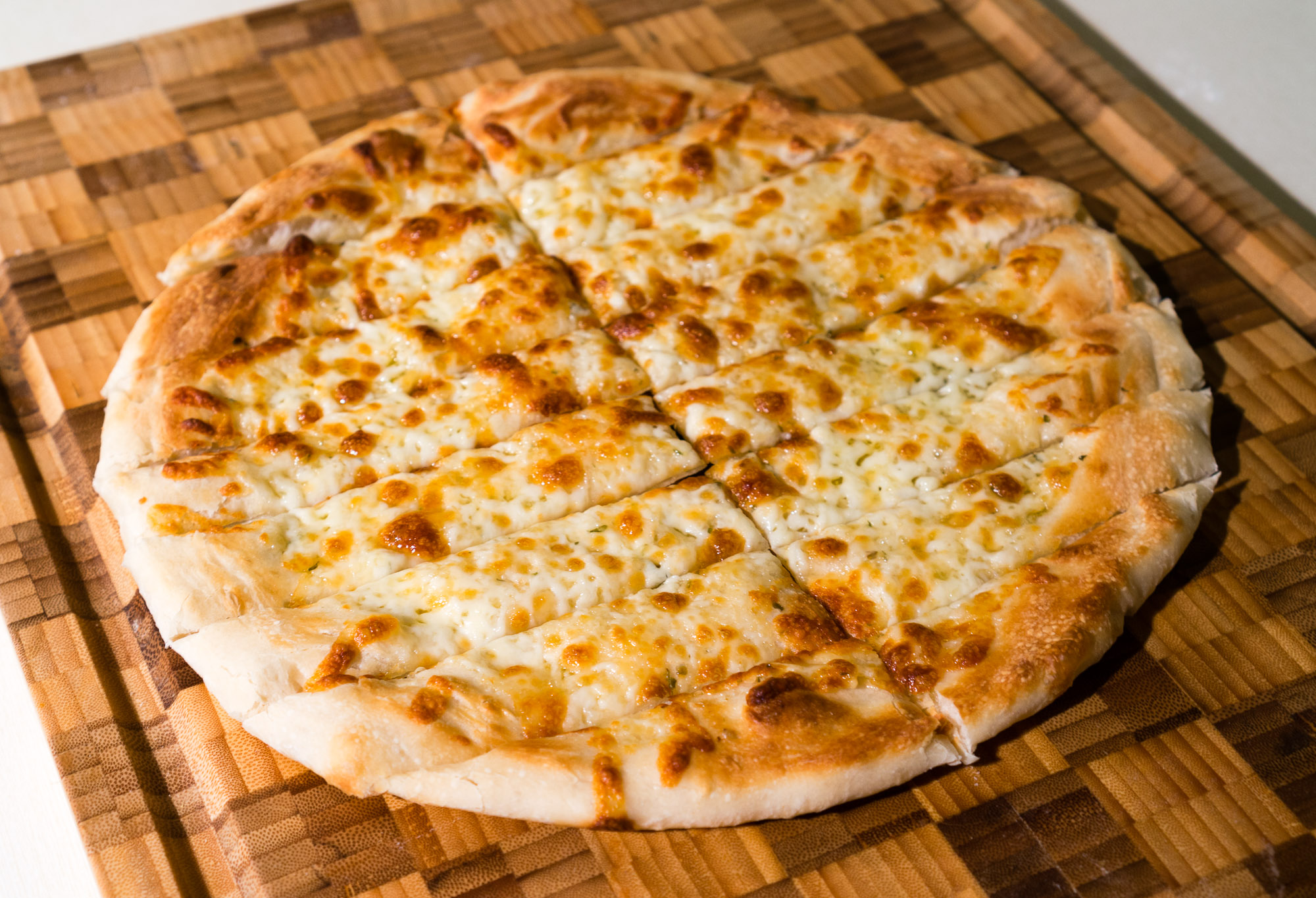
Garlic fingers

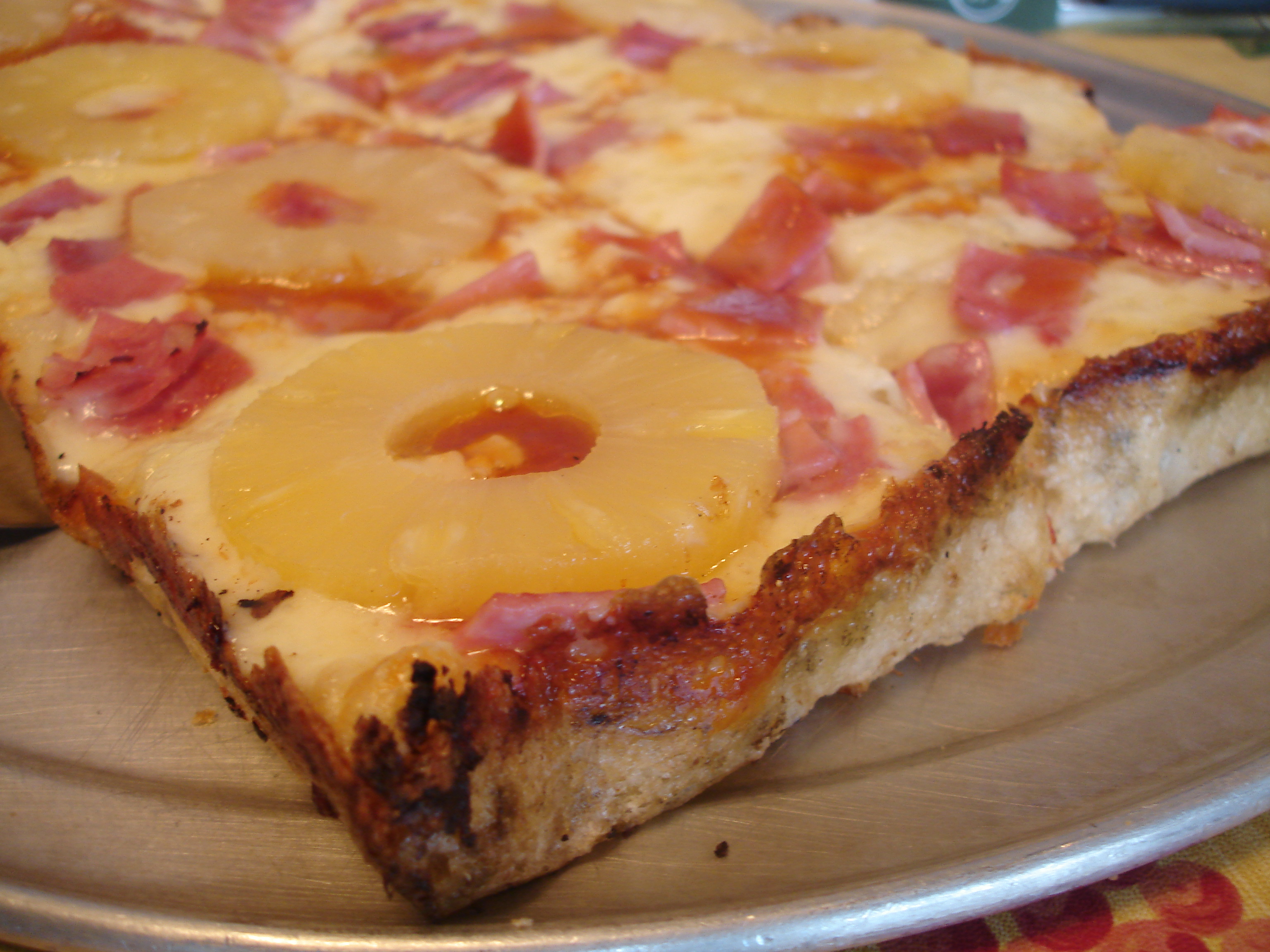
"Hawaiian" pan pizza

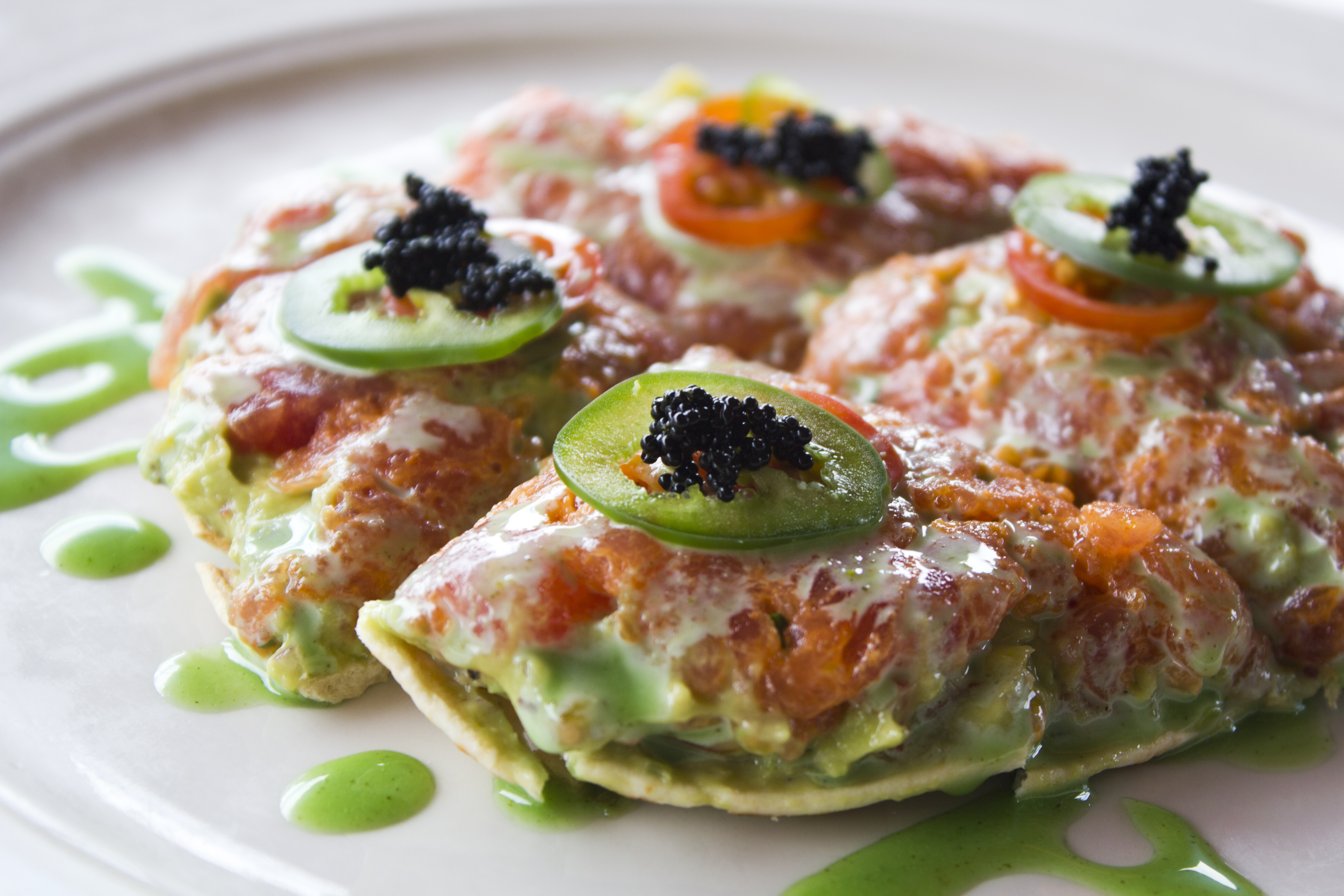
Sushi pizza

==== Seafood ====
Dishes by region ("O" = originating and "X" = found)
Dish	Description	Pacific	Mountain	Prairies	Ontario	Quebec	Atlantic	Northern	Inherited
B.C. roll	Variety of sushi containing salmon and cucumber.	O	X	X					
Cod au gratin	A Newfoundland dish of cod baked in a creamy sauce and topped with cheese.						X		
California roll (Uramaki)	Variety of sushi containing avocado and crab. Invented in British Columbia, despite the name.	O	X	X	X	X	X		
Cod tongues and scrunchions	Baked cod tongue and deep fried pork fat						O		
Dungeness crab tacos	Wonton shells filled with dungeness crab, dijon mustard, and miso paste, among other ingredients. Usually topped with shaved radishes.	O							
Dynamite roll	Variety of sushi typically containing prawn tempura.	O	X	X	X	X	X		
Fish and brewis	Salt cod and hardtack, with pork cracklings.						O		
Fish cakes/ Croquettes de poisson	Rounds of fried cod flakes and mashed potatoes, with summer savoury						O		
Flipper pie	Pie made with harp seal flipper.						O		
Fried walleye	Battered, tempura-like walleye fish fried in cooking oil, often containing garlic. Canada is the only commercial source of walleye and is mostly fished from Lake Erie, Lake Winnipeg, and Lake of the Woods, among other large Canadian lakes.			X	O				
Hot-smoked salmon sandwich	Wild smoked salmon, maple mustard coleslaw and spicy sriracha mayonnaise layered in between a ciabatta bun.	O							
Lobster roll	Lobster meat mixed with mayonnaise and served in a toasted hot dog bun.				X	X	O		
Muktuk	Diced whale skin and blubber, commonly made from bowhead whale.					X	X	O	
Pâté au saumon	Crusted meat pie containing mashed potatoes, cooked salmon, and various spices and herbs.					O			
Pacific smoked salmon	Smoked chinook, sockeye, coho, or pink salmon, commonly prepared on a cedar, alder, or hickory board. Often glazed with honey, maple, or sugar (candied salmon), and may also be dehydrated to create jerky.	O	X						
Smoked goldeye	Winnipeg goldeye (freshwater fish) marinated in brine, lightly dried and smoked over oak, hickory, apple, or cherry wood fire.			O	X				
Teriyaki salmon	Salmon pieces pan-fried in a mixture of butter, honey, soy sauce, garlic and ginger.	O							
White sturgeon caviar	Medium-sized, firm, and dark caviar with a buttery and nutty flavour. Often served with a protein, bread, or dairy product, such as fish, blinis, or crème fraîche.	O							

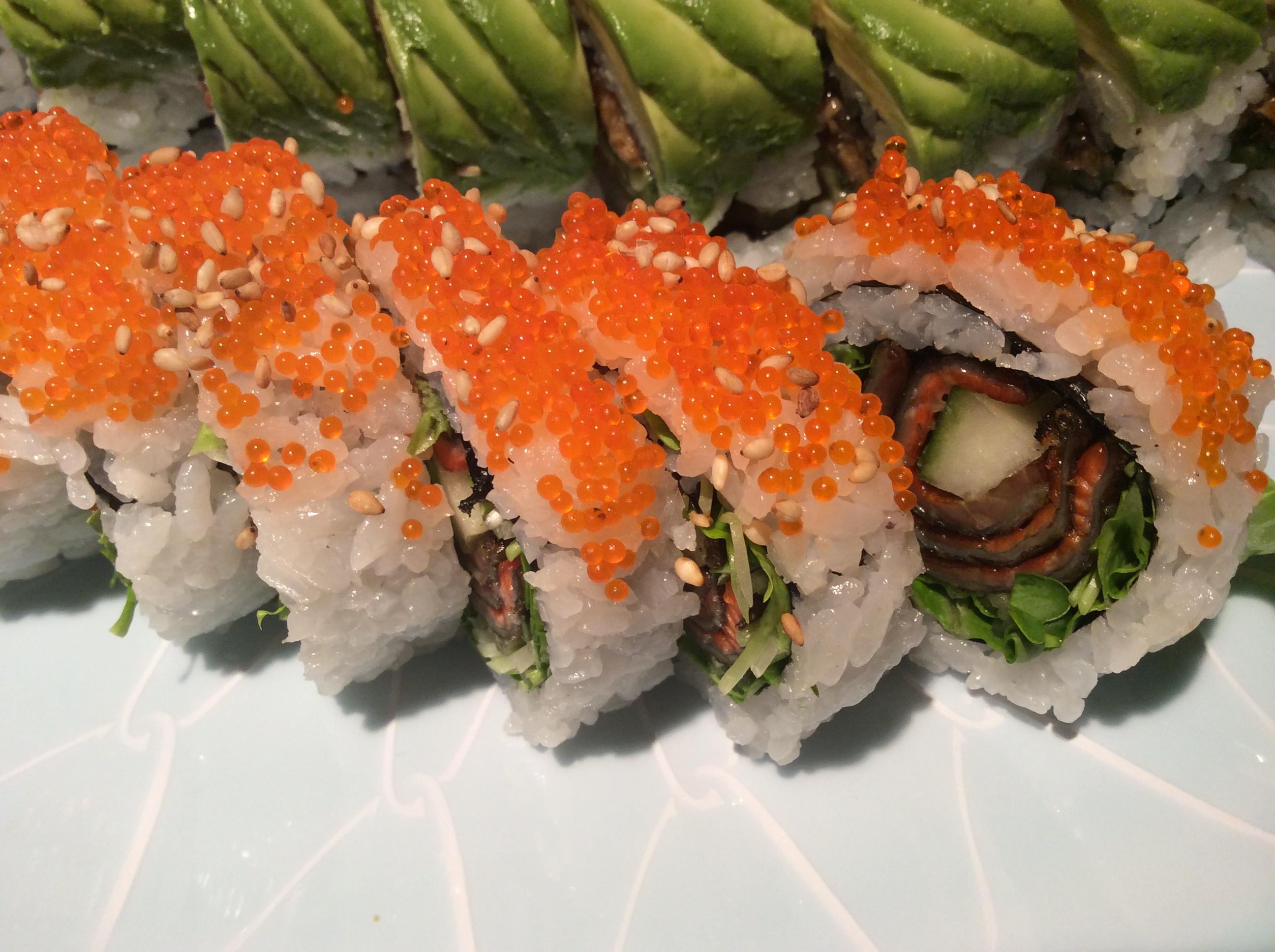
B.C. roll sushi

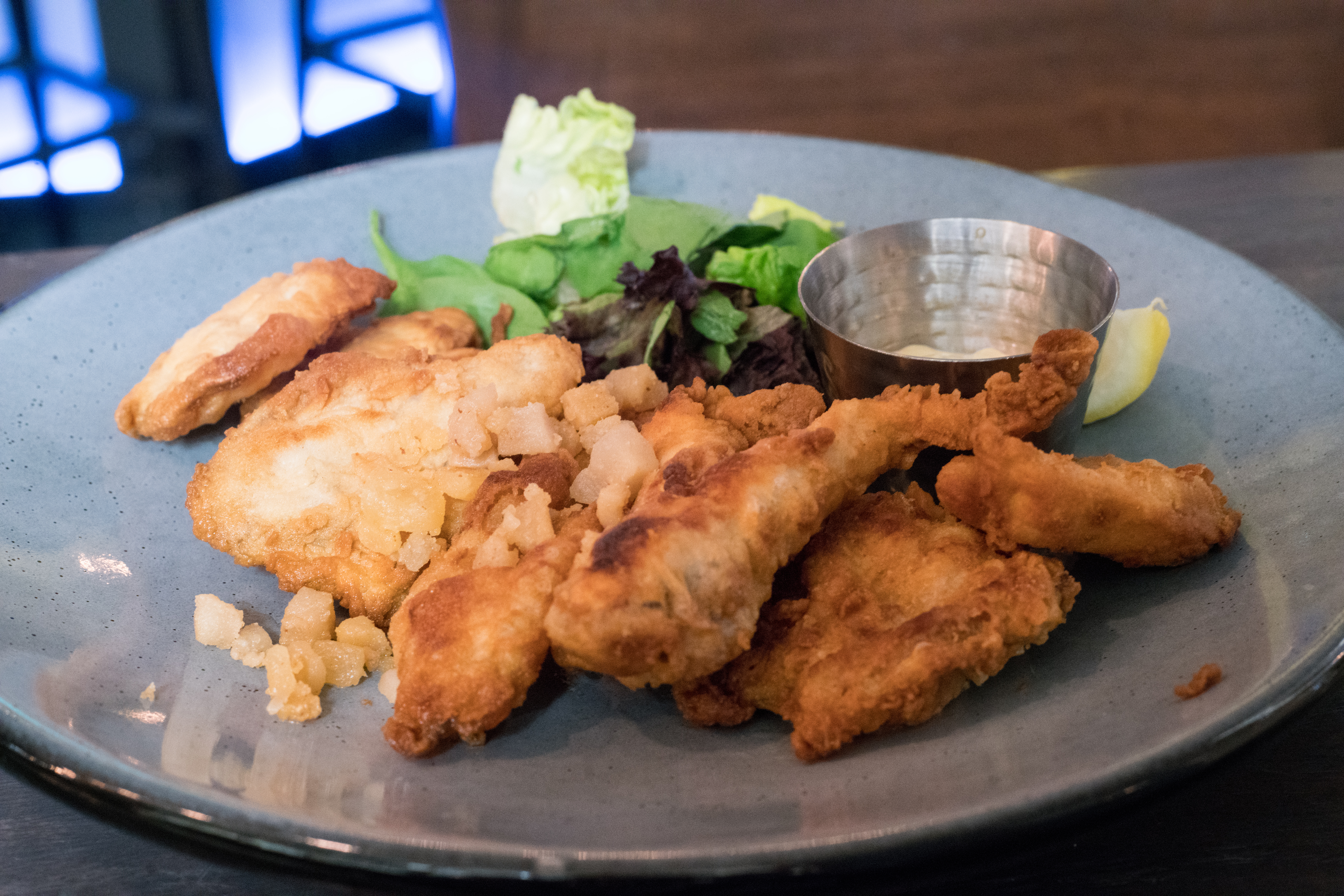
Cod tongues from St John's, Newfoundland

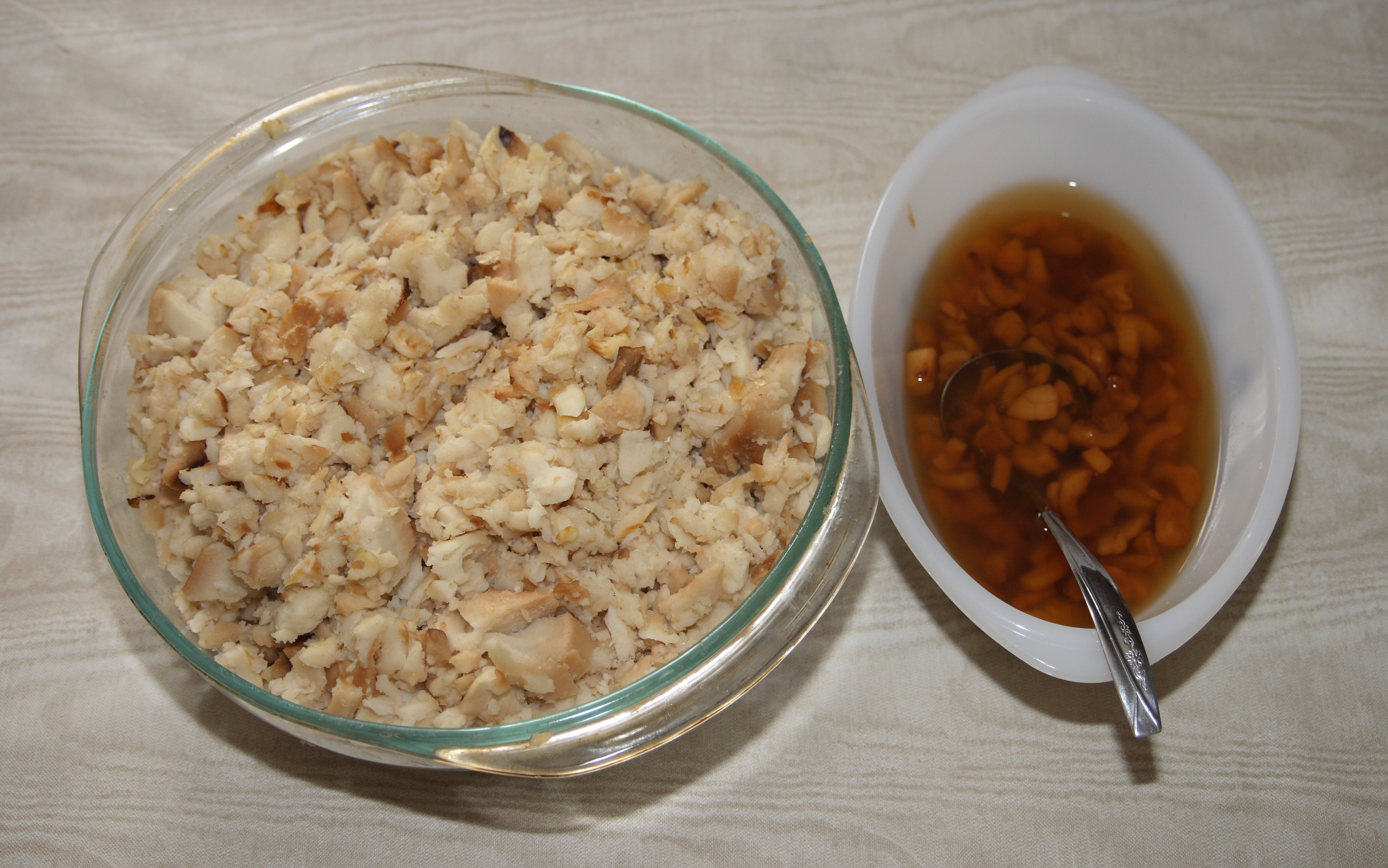
Fish and brewis: salted cod and hard tack

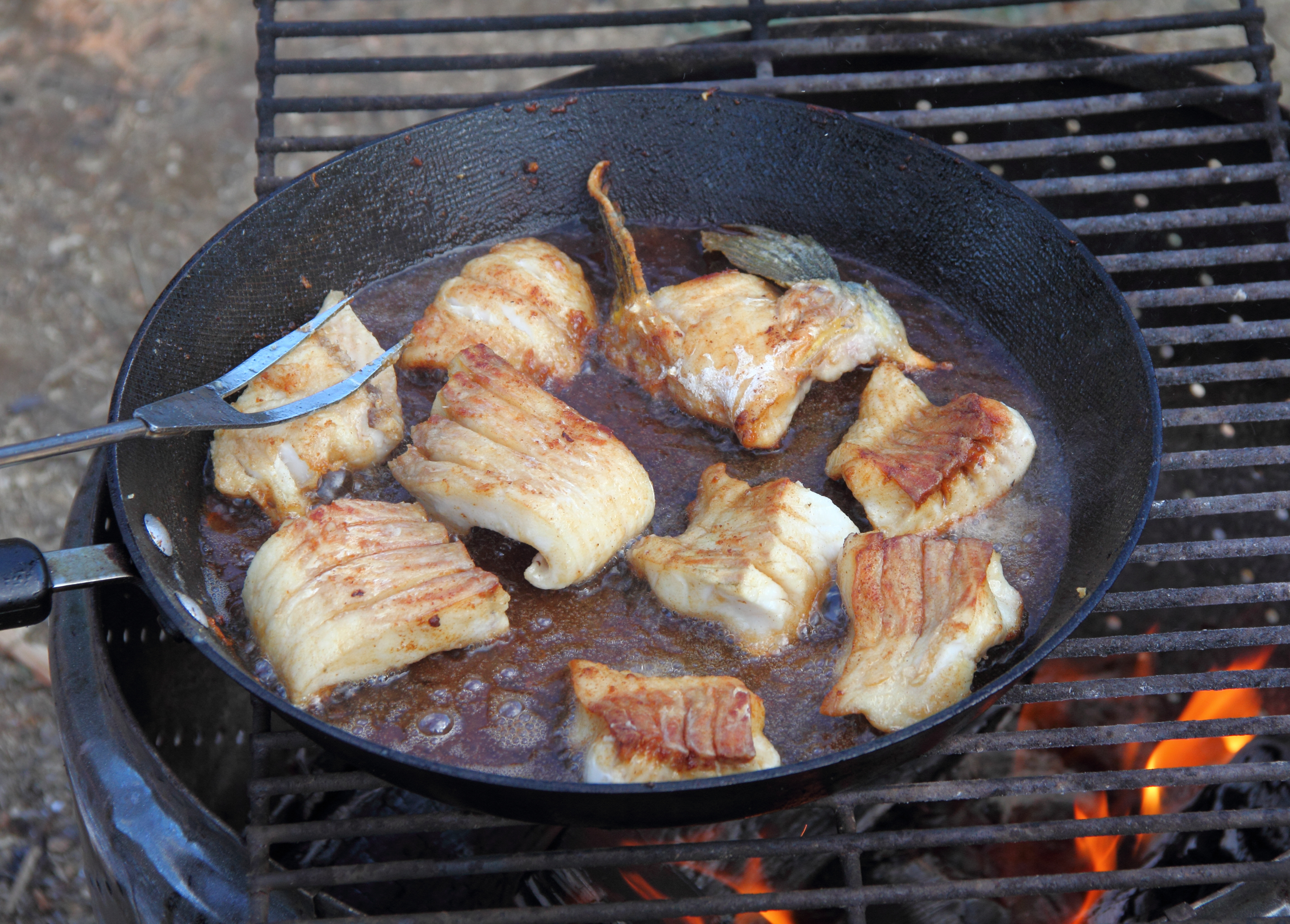
Pan-fried walleye

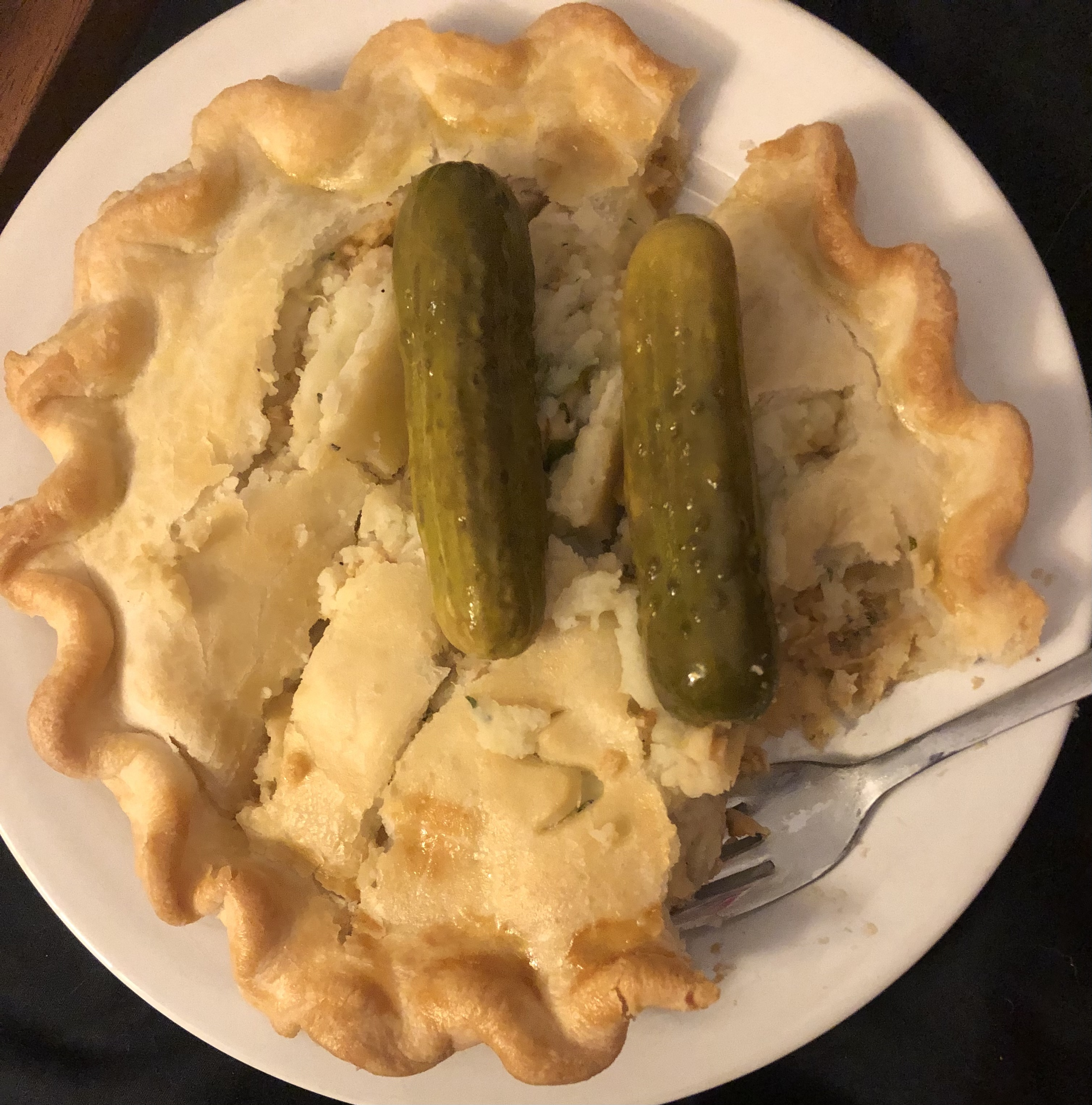
Pâté au saumon

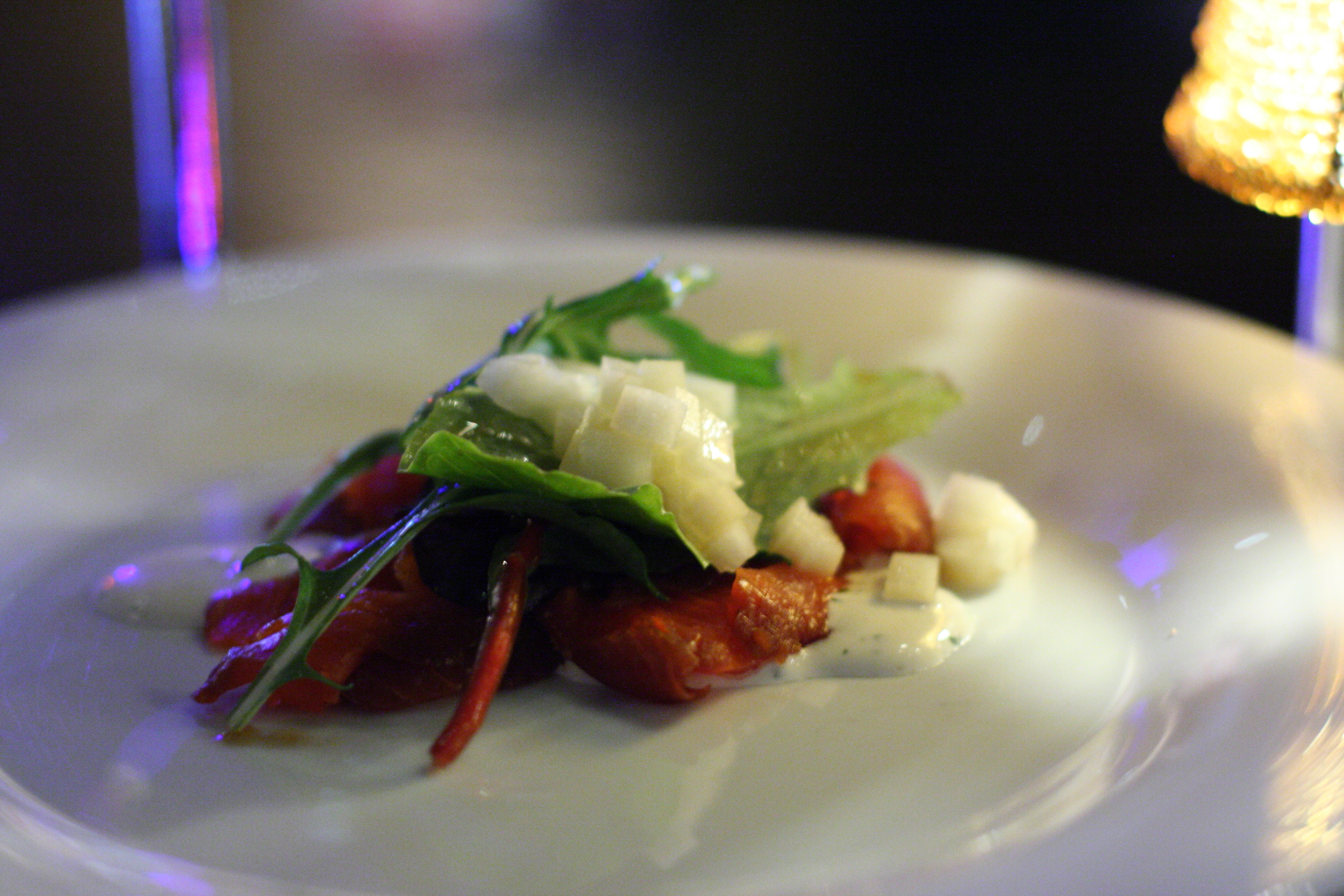
Smoked B.C. salmon appetizer

==== Soups and stews ====
Dishes by region ("O" = originating and "X" = found)
Dish	Description	Pacific	Mountain	Prairies	Ontario	Quebec	Atlantic	Northern	Inherited
Atlantic/Maritime seafood chowder	Also referred to as "Nova Scotia" or "Fundy" seafood chowder. Contains a variety of Atlantic seafood ingredients, such as haddock, lobster, scallops, shrimp and/or clams. May also contain bacon, potatoes, carrots, onions, pepper, salt, dill and chives. Dairy may be 35% heavy cream, whipping cream, half-and-half, or canned milk.						O		
Bologna stew	A stew made of cubed chunks of Bologna sausage.						O		
Caribou stew	Traditional Nunavummiut stew made with a combination of boneless caribou cubes, onions, celery, red wine, tomato paste, bay leaves, thyme, potatoes, carrots, turnips, beef stock, oil, salt, and pepper. Lengthy simmering is required to tenderize all ingredients.							O	
Doukhobour-Canadian borscht	A vegetarian borscht distinguished by its orange colour. Contains cream, mashed potatoes, dill, and often beets.	X	O	X					
Fricot	Consists of potatoes, onions, and a protein (such as chicken, clams, rabbit, beef, or pork), stewed and topped with dumplings.						O		
Hodge Podge	Nova Scotian version of the Scottish stew, consisting of potatoes, beans, peas, and/or carrots, cooked in milk broth.						O		
Soupe aux gourganes	Soup in which the primary ingredient is fava beans. Consists of beef broth, bacon, pearl barley, carrots, fat cabbage, tomato, vermicelli, savoury and chives.					O			
West Coast fish chowder	Creamy soup from Vancouver Island containing candied salmon and rockfish.	O							
Yellow pea soup	French-Canadian comfort food prepared with yellow peas, salted pork, and fresh herbs. Often served with johnnycake in Anglophone areas.			X	X	O	X		
Ragoût de boulettes	Traditional Québécois dish eaten during the holiday season in Québec made of pork meatballs, breadcrumbs, eggs, onions and spices.					O			
Ragoût de Pattes de Cochon	Québécois dish, commonly served with turkey, eaten during the holiday season in Québec made of pig's feet, onions, toasted flour, and spices.					O			

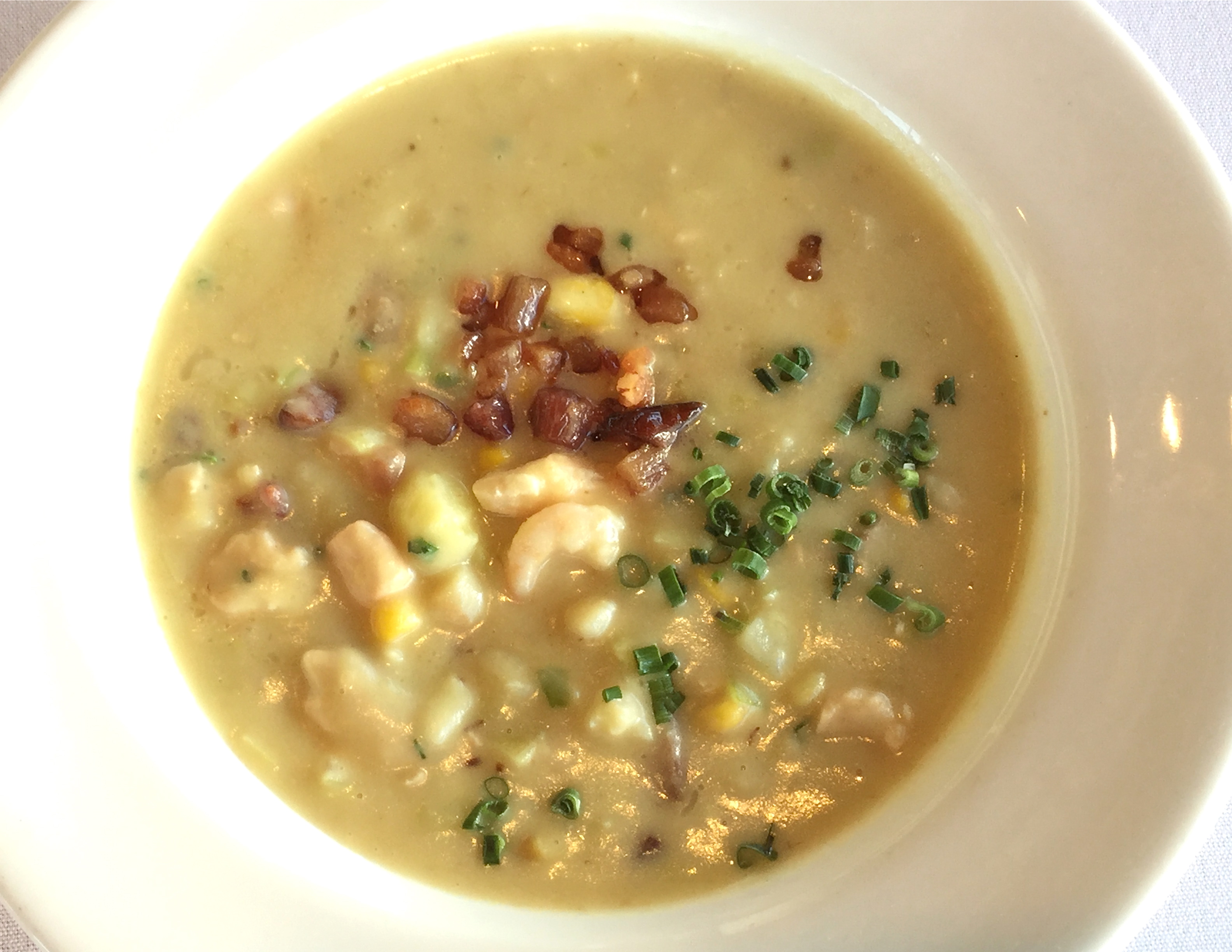
B.C. seafood chowder

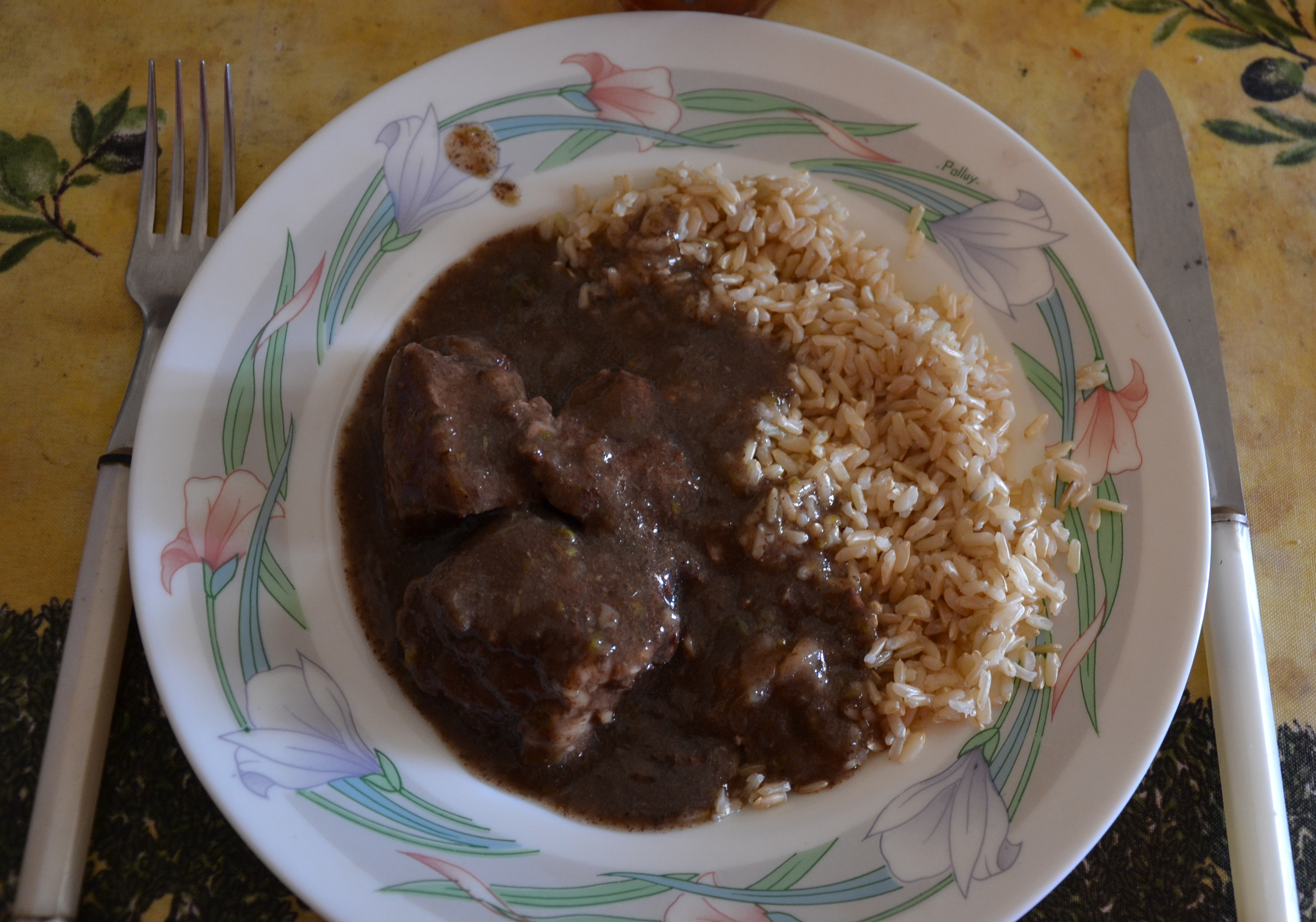
Fricot

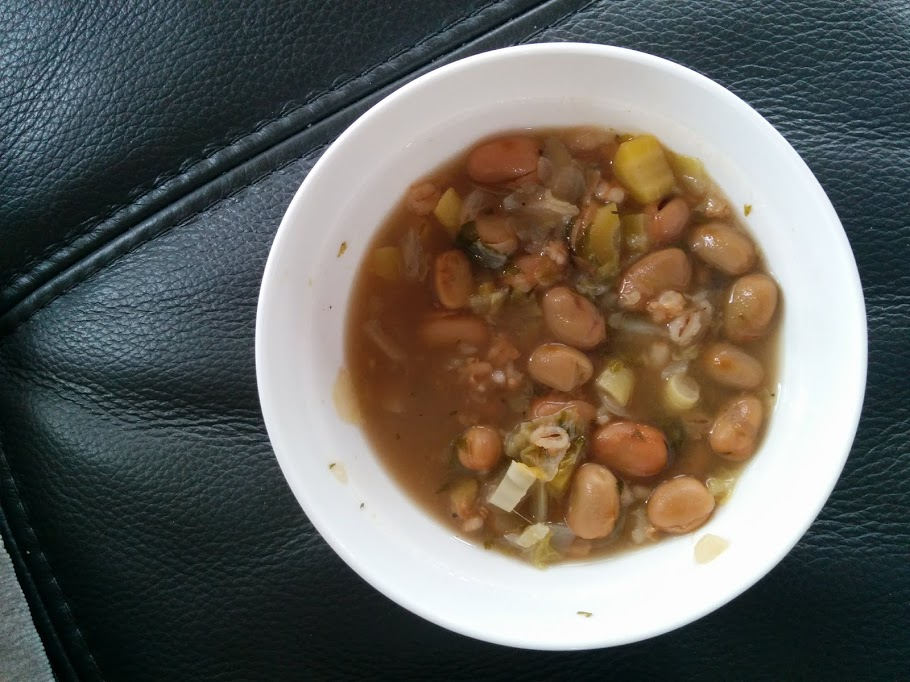
Soupe aux gourganes

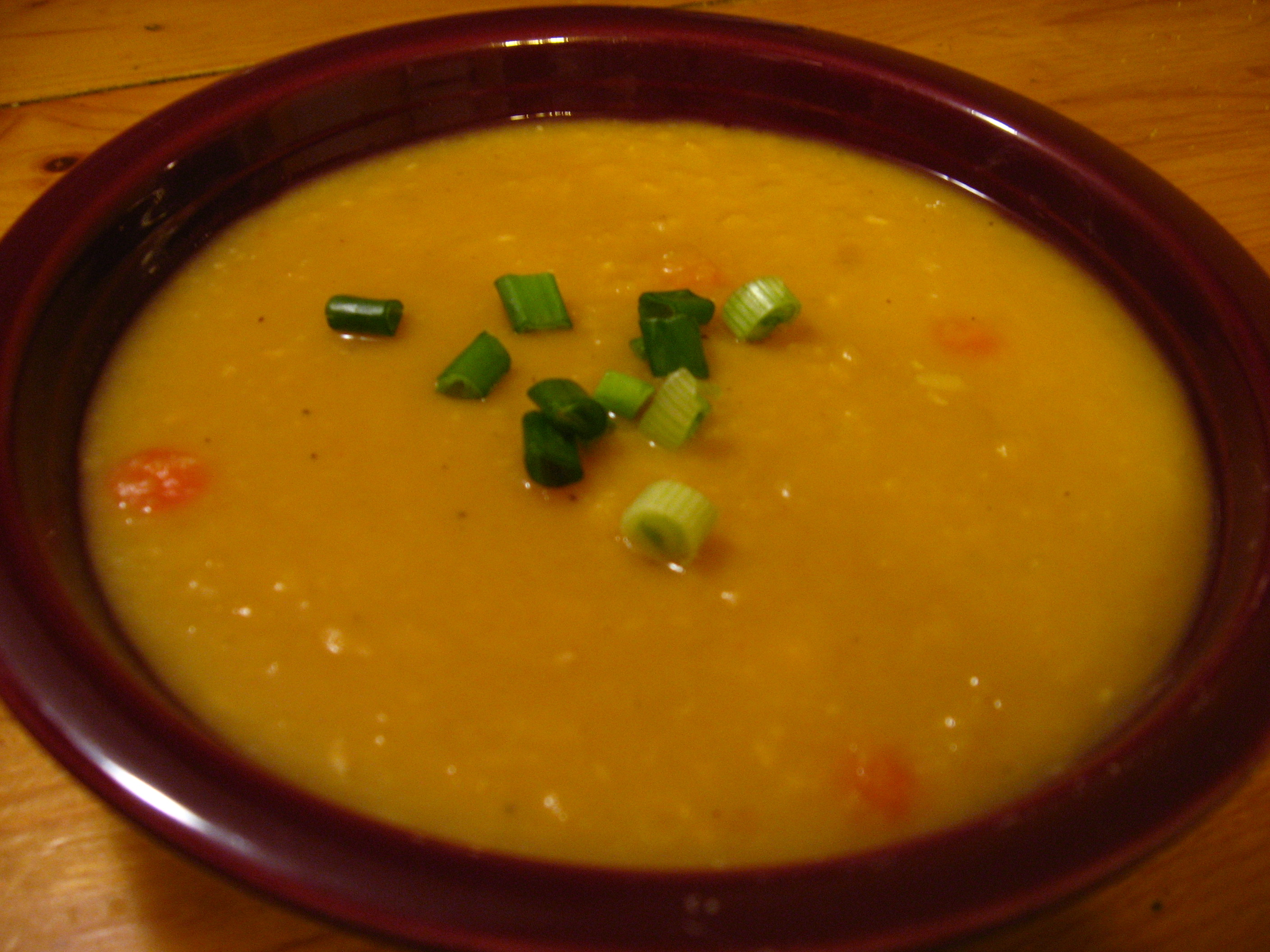
Yellow split pea soup

=== Pastries and desserts ===
Many pastries and desserts originate from Canada. Over 2100 bakery product manufacturing establishments, and more than 1200 retail bakeries, operate in the country. Tim Hortons, a Canadian restaurant chain that specialized in baked goods, maintains the highest number of franchises in the country.

- Apple fritter—deep fried pastry rolled with apple and cinnamon, broken into pieces and then reformed into a single mass, then glazed with icing.
- Beaver tails—also known as elephant ears, moose antlers, dog ears, whale tails, or simply fried dough.
- Blueberry grunt—sweetened and stewed blueberries topped with a biscuit or dumpling.
- Brownie dominoes with wild blueberry cinnamon sauce—British Columbia regional delicacy; chocolate brownies topped with sauce made of wild B.C. blueberries and heated cinnamon.
- Butter tarts—said to be invented in Eastern Ontario around 1915. The main ingredients for the filling include butter, sugar and eggs, but raisins and pecans are often added for additional flavour.
- Canadian maple doughnut—similar to a Boston cream doughnut; a custard-filled, solid pastry with a maple icing.
- Cinnamon buns—Canadian variation of the cinnamon roll. One British Columbia variation includes apple and cranberry.
- Date square (also called "Date crumblies" or "Matrimonial cake")—date-filled desserts with an oatmeal crumb topping.
- Dutchie—a square, yeast-lifted doughnut containing raisins and coated with a sugary glaze.
- Girl Guide Cookies—chocolate and vanilla cream-filled cookies, as well as chocolate mint. Traditionally sold by the Girl Guides of Canada since 1927.
- Glazed maple shortbread cookies—typically served during Canada Day celebrations.
- Grands-pères—dough dumplings boiled in maple syrup.
- Jam busters—prairie jelly doughnuts
- Jam Jams—molasses cookie sandwiches filled with jam.
- Lassy Mogs—Newfoundland cookies made with molasses, spices, dried fruits, and toasted pecans.
- Maple leaf cream cookies—"sandwich cookie" containing maple-flavoured cream.
- Moosehunters—molasses cookies.
- Nanaimo bars—consists of three layers: a wafer, nut (walnuts, almonds, or pecans), and coconut crumb base; custard icing in the middle; and a layer of chocolate ganache on top. Most common in British Columbia, gaining its name sake from the Vancouver Island town of Nanaimo, BC.
- Nanaimo balls—a bite-sized variation of the British Columbian classic. Considered a Christmas treat.
- Passion flakes—pastry sandwich filled with raspberries or apple jam, and vanilla icing or whipped cream.
- Persians—somewhat like a cross between a large cinnamon bun and a doughnut, topped with strawberry icing; particular to Thunder Bay.
- Pets de sœurs—"nun farts", pastry dough wrapped around a brown sugar and butter filling.
- Pinecone gingerbread cookies—pinecone-shaped gingerbread cookies.
- Pouding chômeur—"poor man's pudding".
- Queen Elizabeth cake—a lightly sweet, moist, and low-fat date (fruit) cake, topped with a brown sugar, butter and coconut broiled topping.
- Schmoo torte—a torte with layered whipped cream, caramel, and nuts, commonly made using angel food or sponge cake.
- Sweet bannock—a piece of bannock sweetened with cinnamon and sugar, or made into bread pudding with berries.
- Tea biscuit—similar to the North American biscuit or scone; quickbread typically made with cheese and herbs.
- Timbits—baked dough balls, provided in a variety of flavours and toppings.
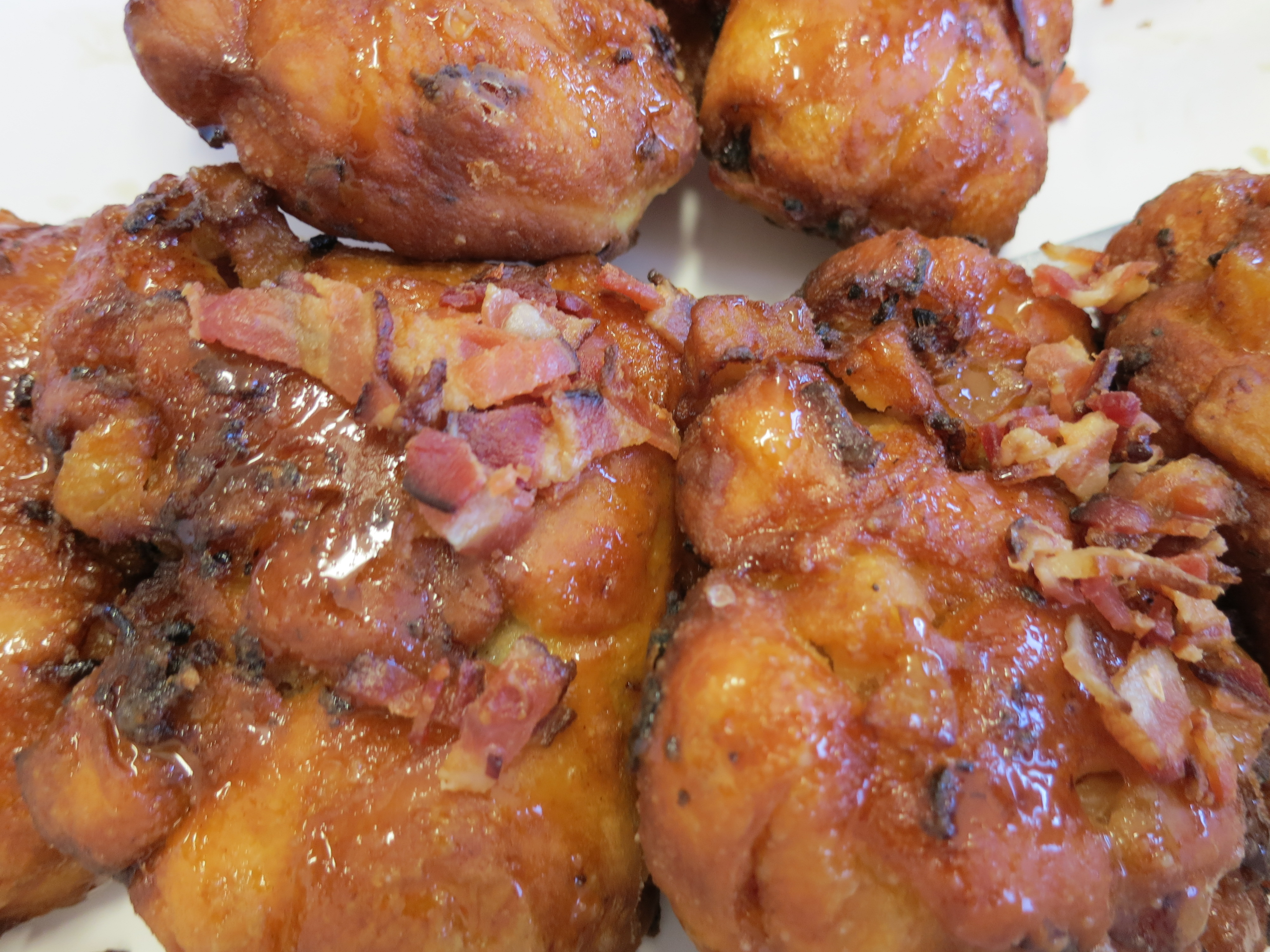
Apple fritters with bacon

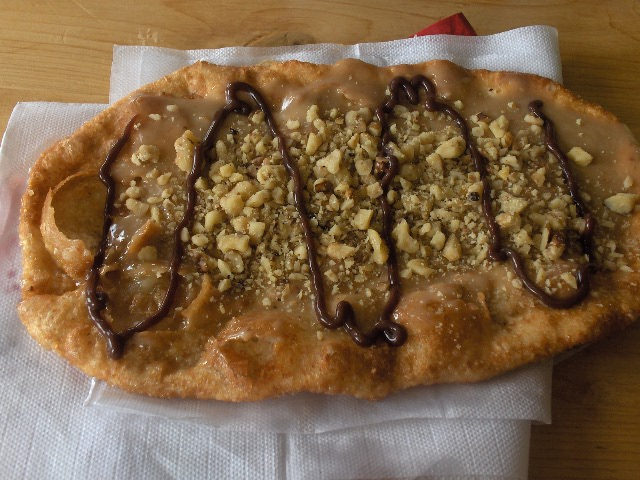
Beavertail

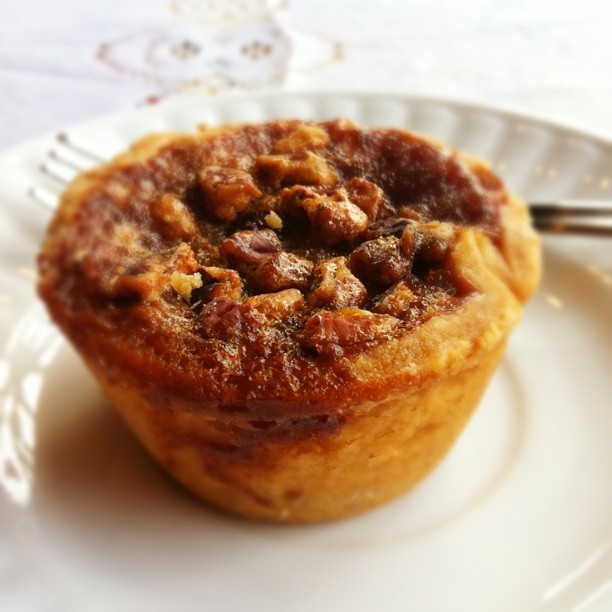
Butter tart

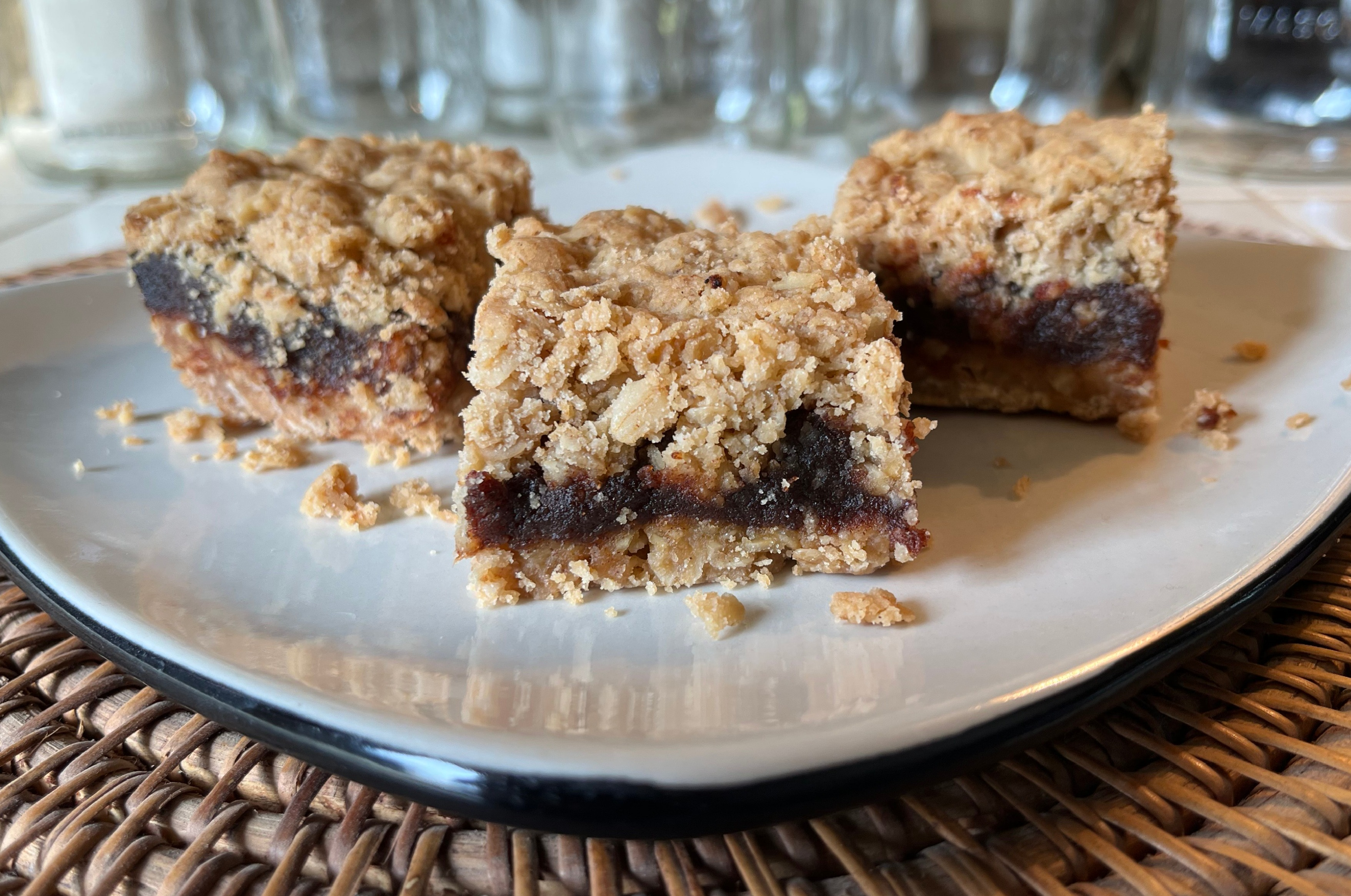
Date squares

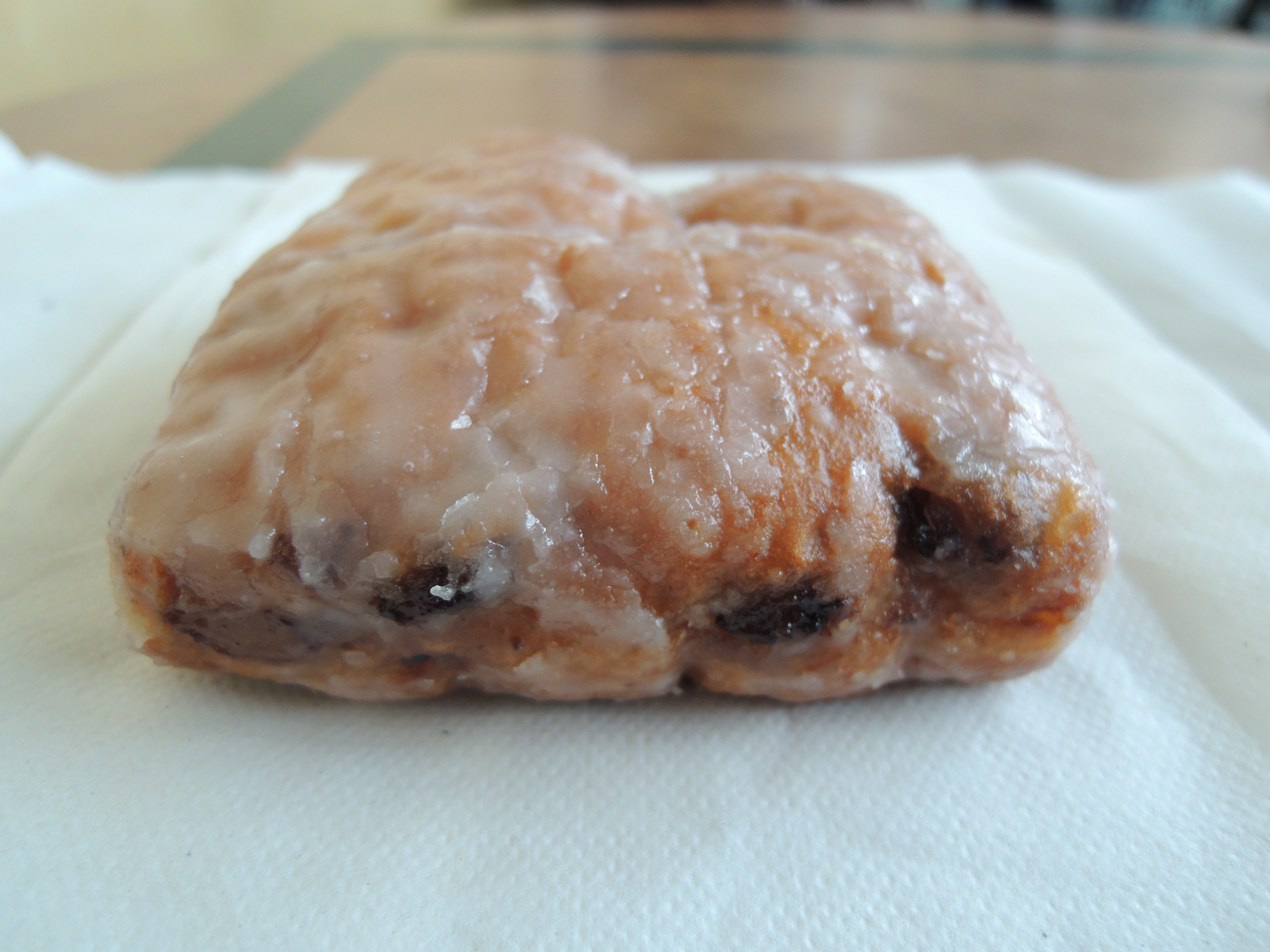
Dutchie

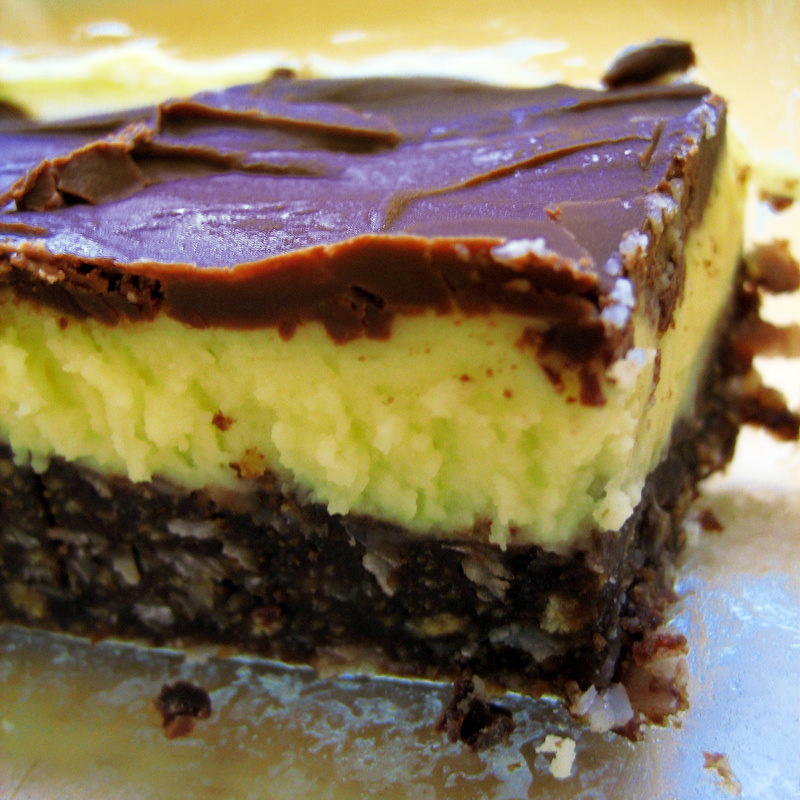
Nanaimo bar

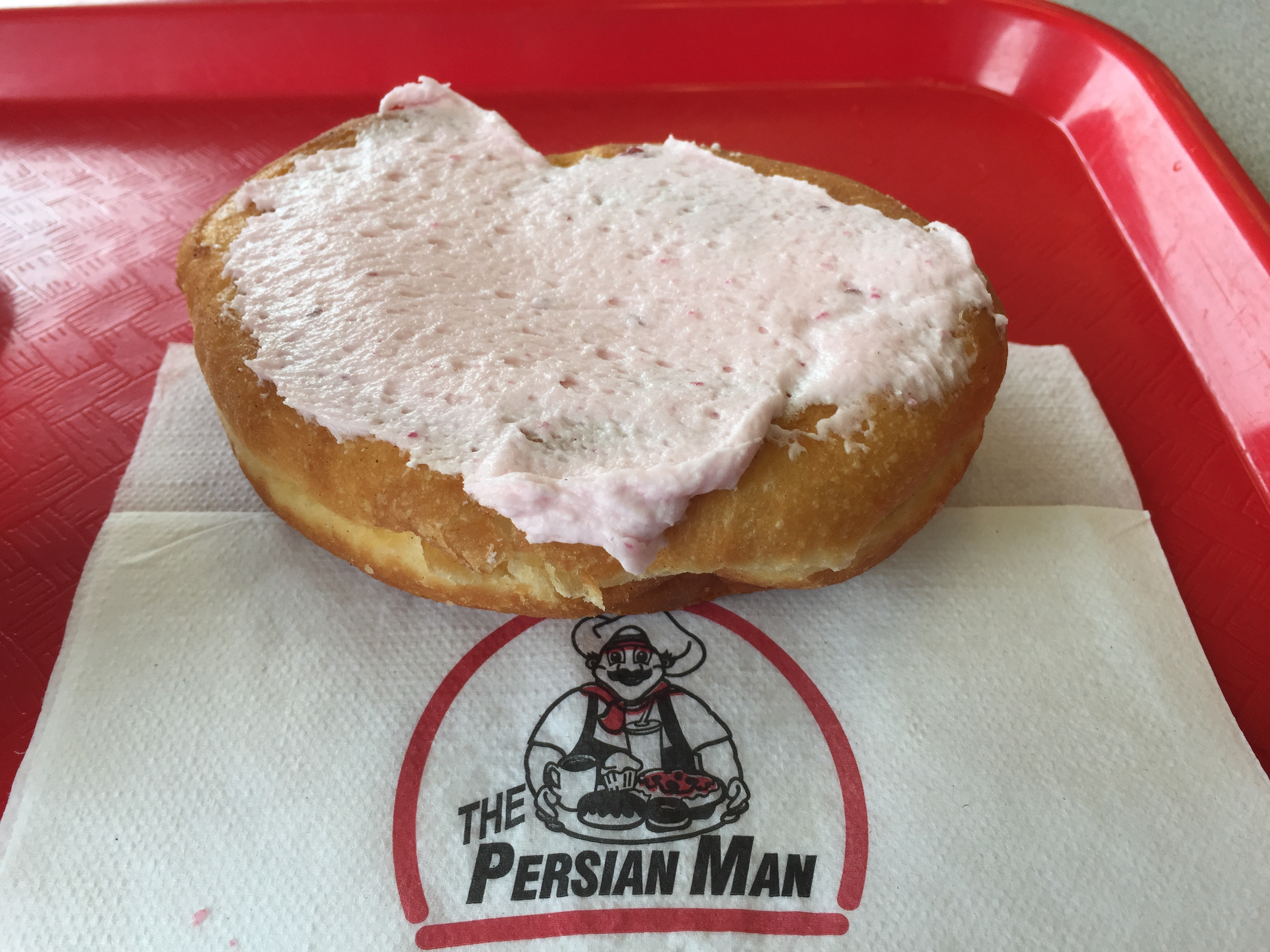
Persian roll

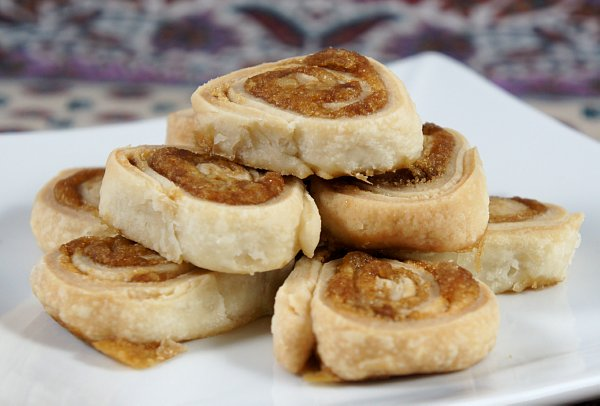
Pets de sœurs (Nun farts)

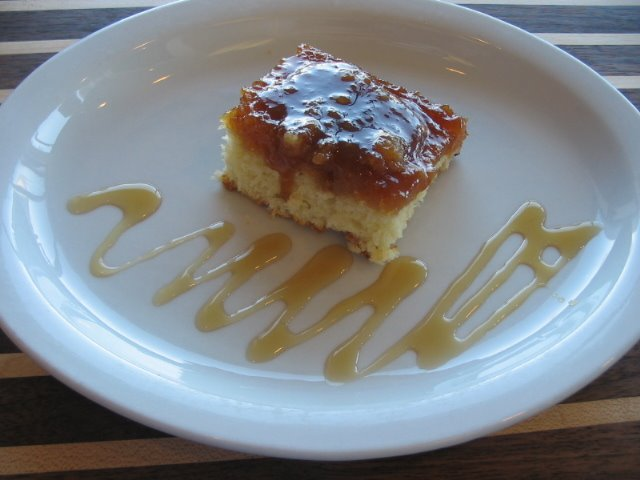
Pouding chômeur (Poor man's pudding)

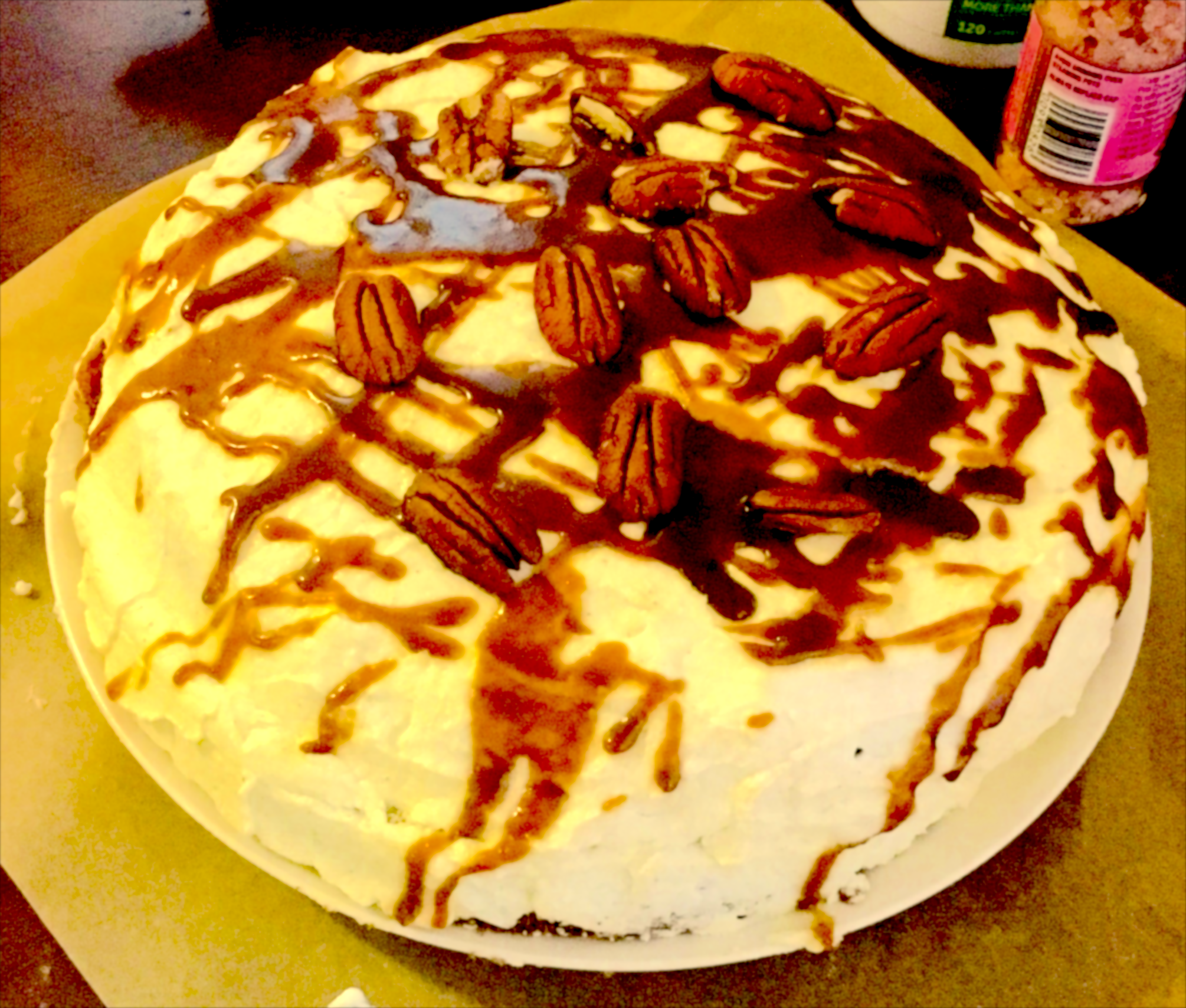
Schmoo torte

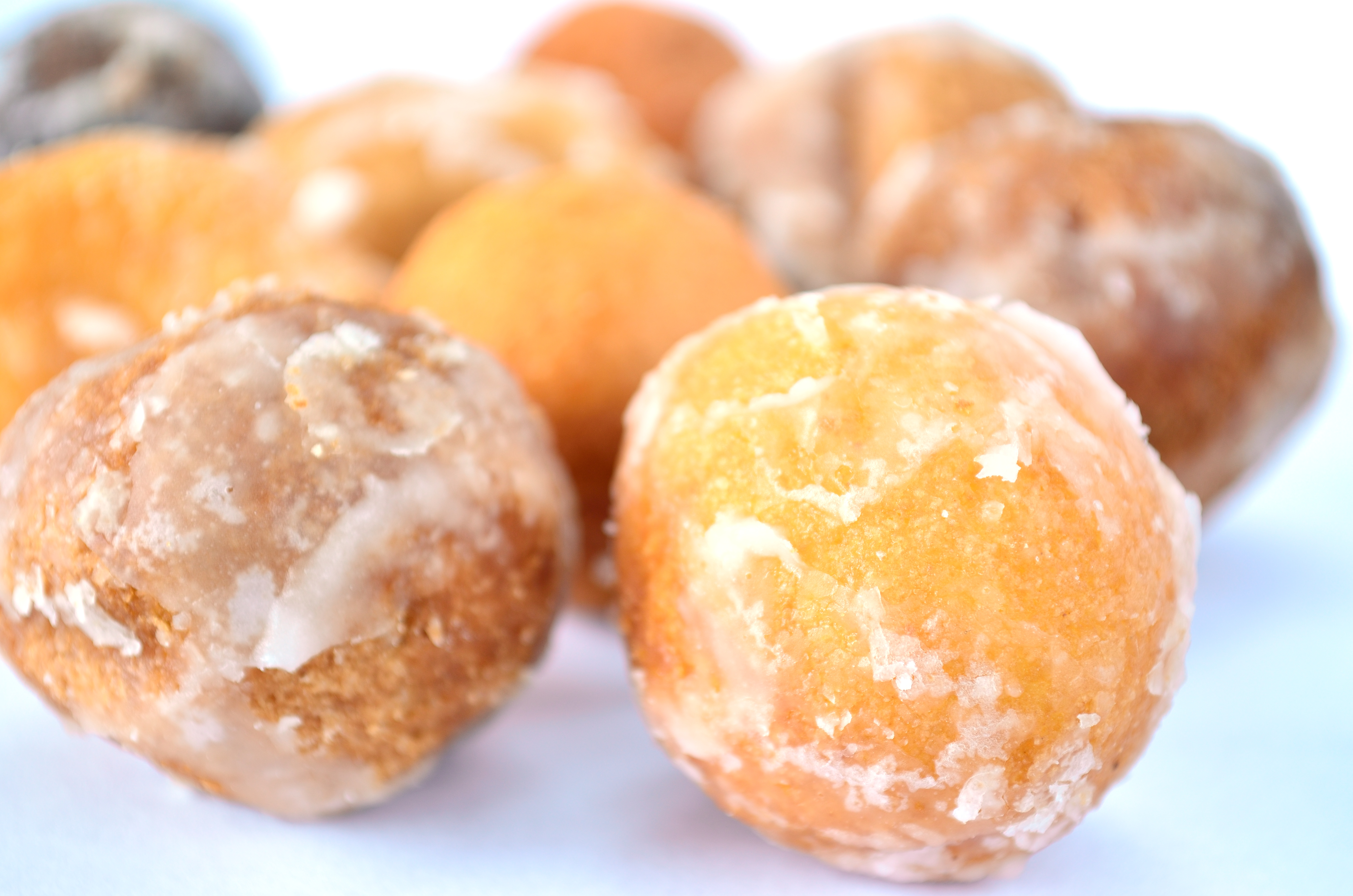
Timbits

==== Confection ====
- Candy apple—also known as "toffee apple".
- Figgy duff—pudding from Newfoundland containing molasses and raisins.
- Maple syrup—especially as tire d'érable sur la neige or "maple toffee" or "taffy". Often used as flavouring (such as in "maple leaf cream cookies", "grandpères", or "Canadian maple donuts").
  - Maple taffy—a sugar candy made by pouring hot maple sap onto snow.
- Nougabricot—preserve consisting of apricots, almonds, and pistachios.
- Sucre à la crème—French-Canadian name for Scottish "tablets".
- Sxusem—whipped confection made from soapberries and other various fruits
- Tiger tail ice cream—orange flavoured ice cream with a black liquorice swirl.
- Blueberry grunt, a combination of stewed blueberries and sweet dumplings common in the Maritimes, especially Cape Breton
- Cape Breton pork pie, a small meatless tart containing dates and topped with maple icing.
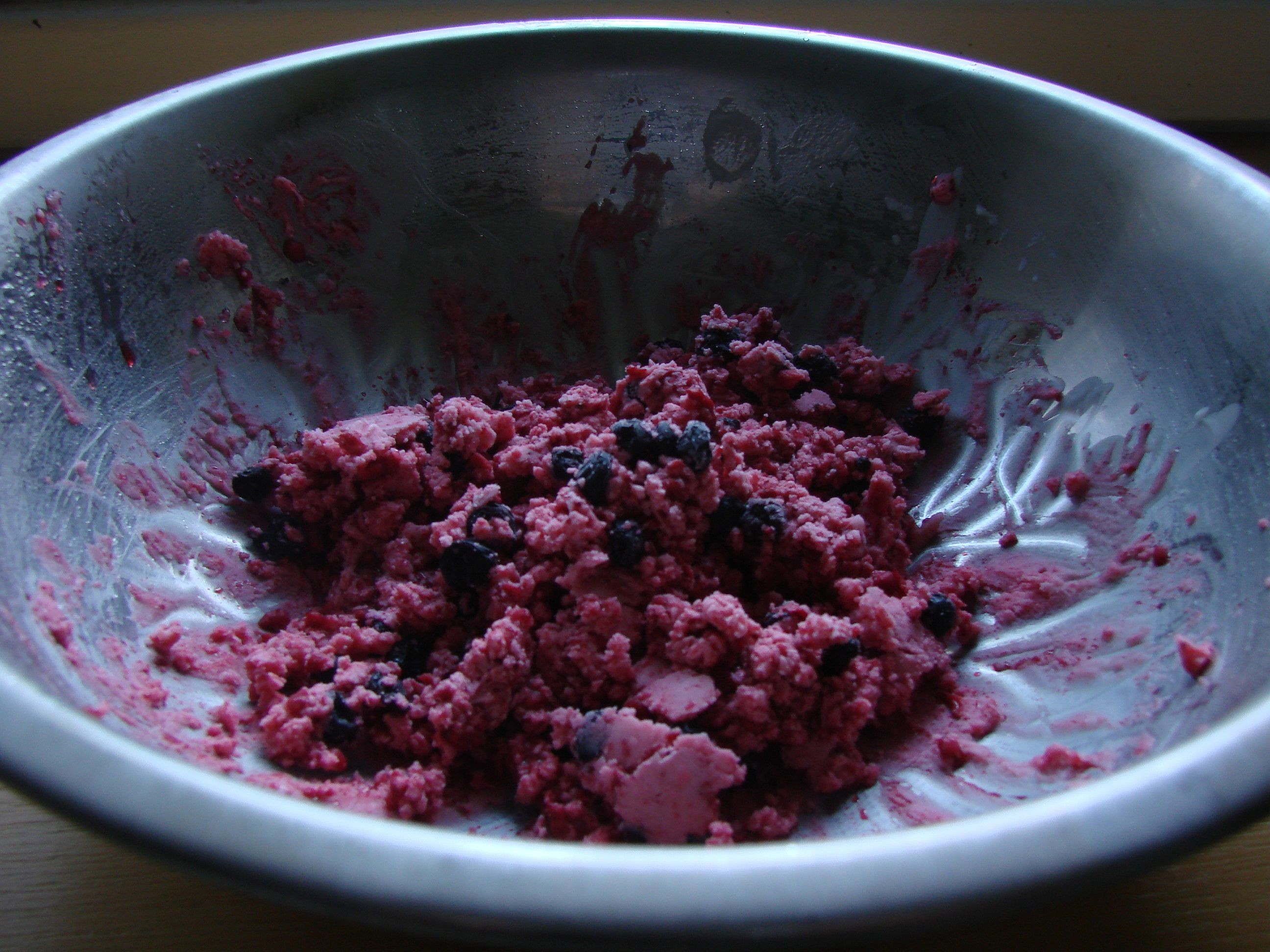
Arctic berry sxusem

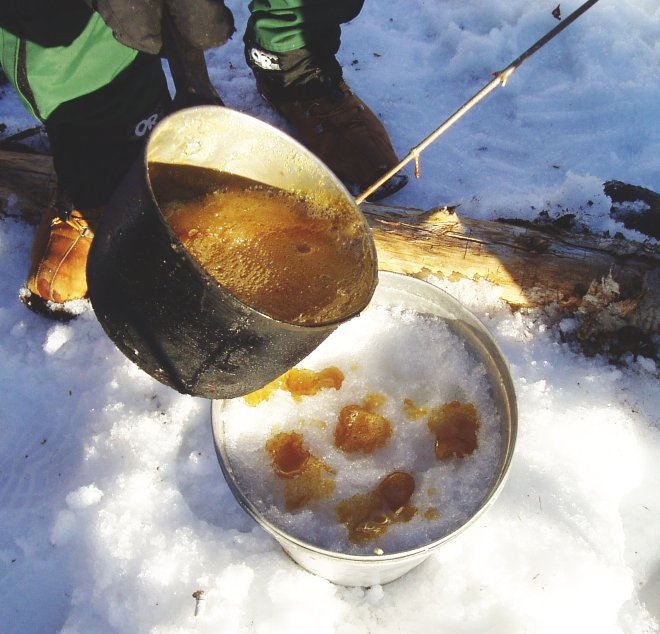
Maple toffee

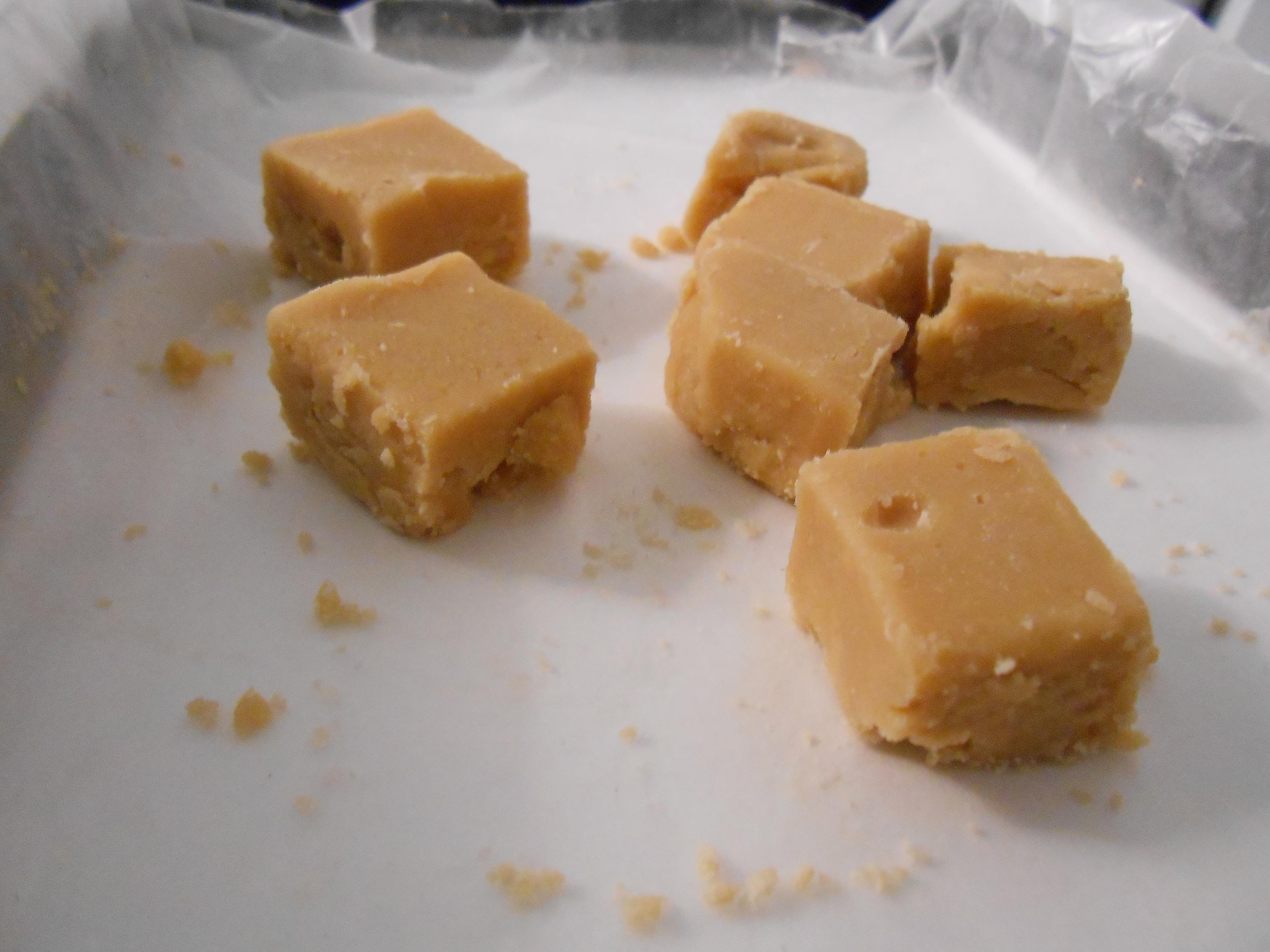
Sucre à la crème (Sugar and cream)

==== Pie ====
- Bakeapple pie—traditional pie from Newfoundland containing cloudberries.
- Bumbleberry pie—"bumbleberry" is a mixture of fruit, berries, and rhubarb.
- Flapper pie—also known as "wafer pie" in Winnipeg; a custard pie popular in Western Canada.
- Maple syrup pie—similar to chess pie, using maple syrup.
- Saskatoonberry pie—pie made from Saskatoon berries.
- Tarte au sucre ("sugar pie")—based on the French dessert.
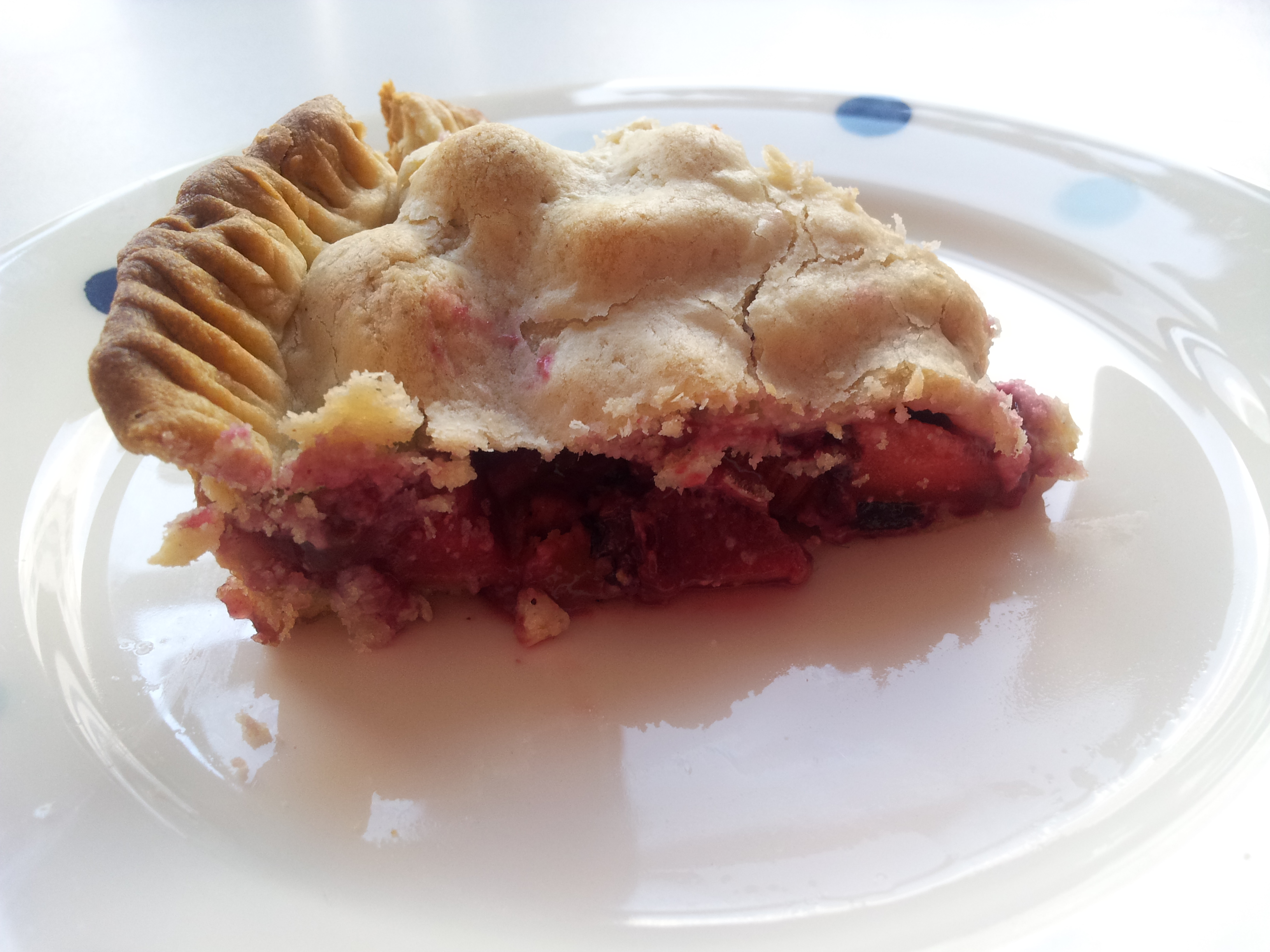
Bumbleberry pie

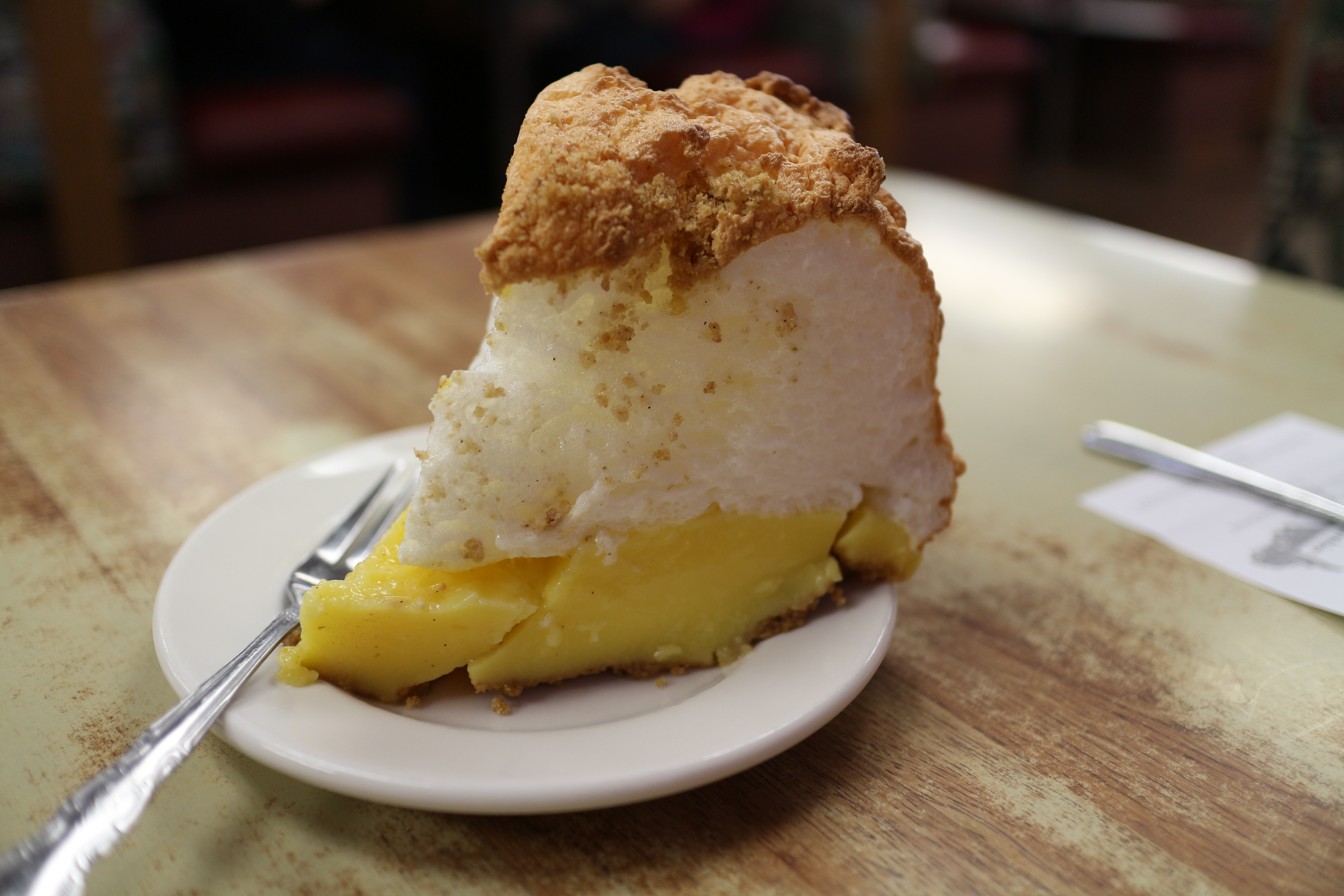
Flapper pie

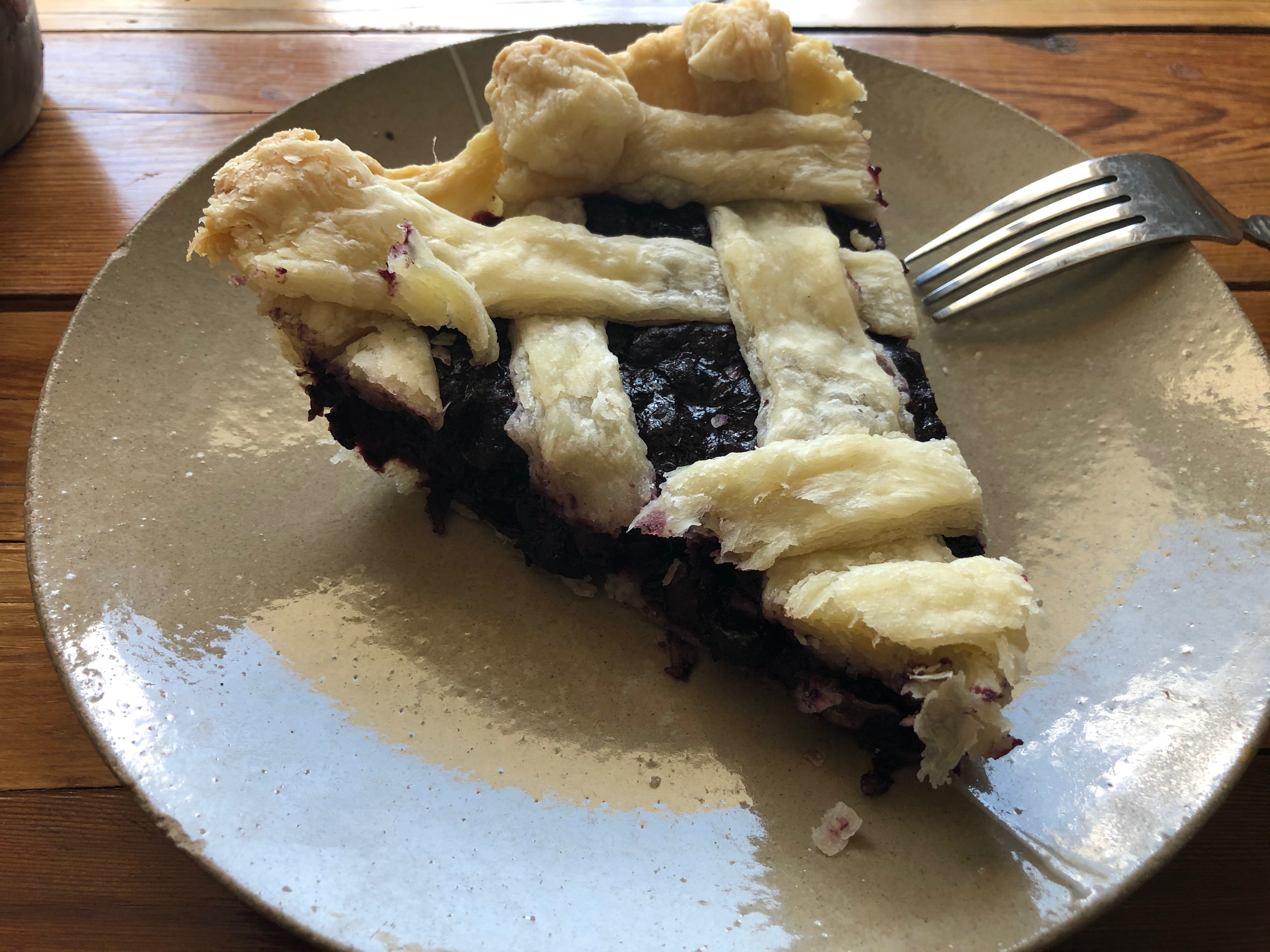
Saskatoonberry pie

=== Cheese ===
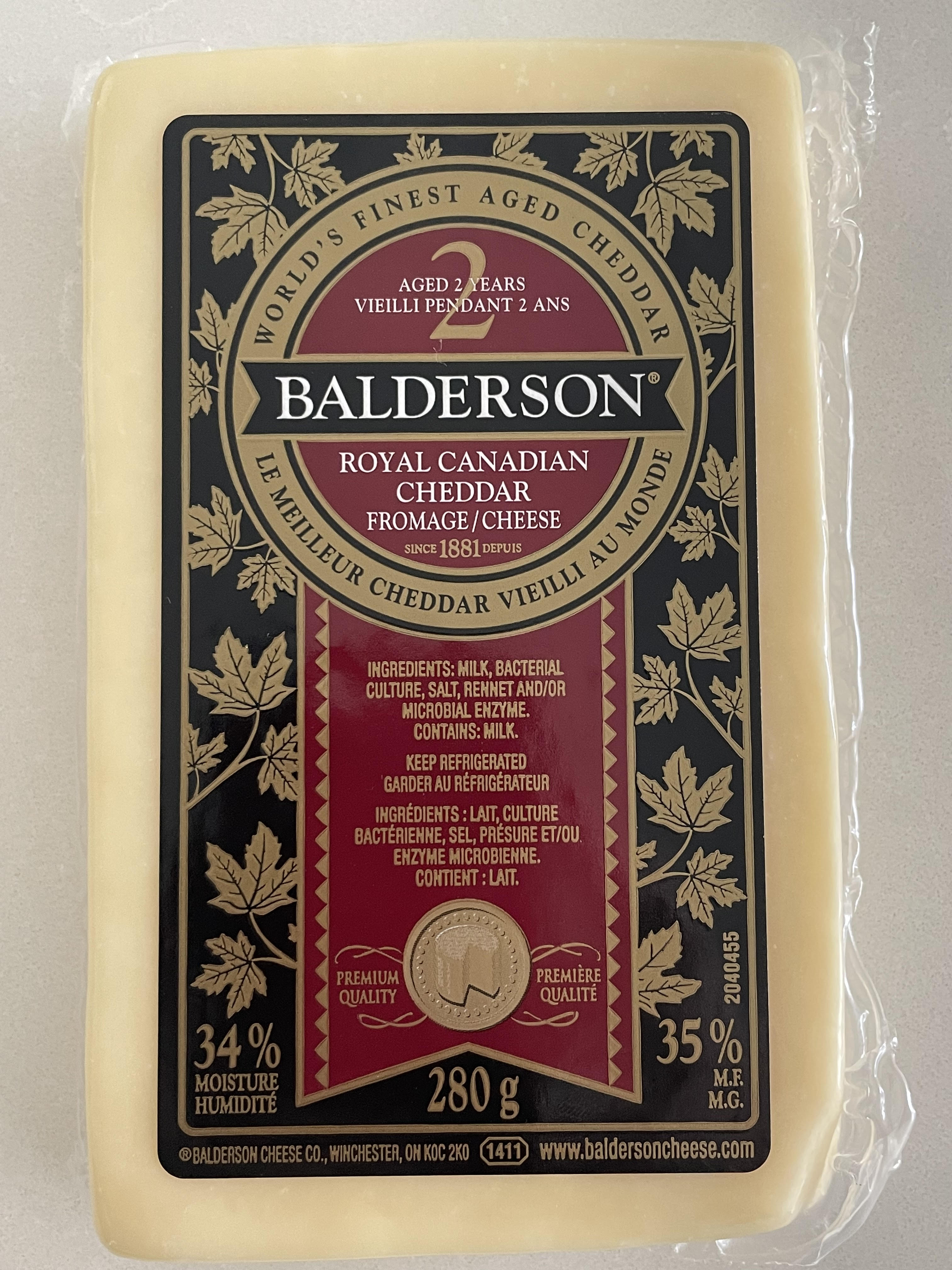
Balderson "Royal Canadian Cheddar". Canadian cheddar is a particularly smooth and creamy cheddar cheese that holds a balance between flavour and sharpness.

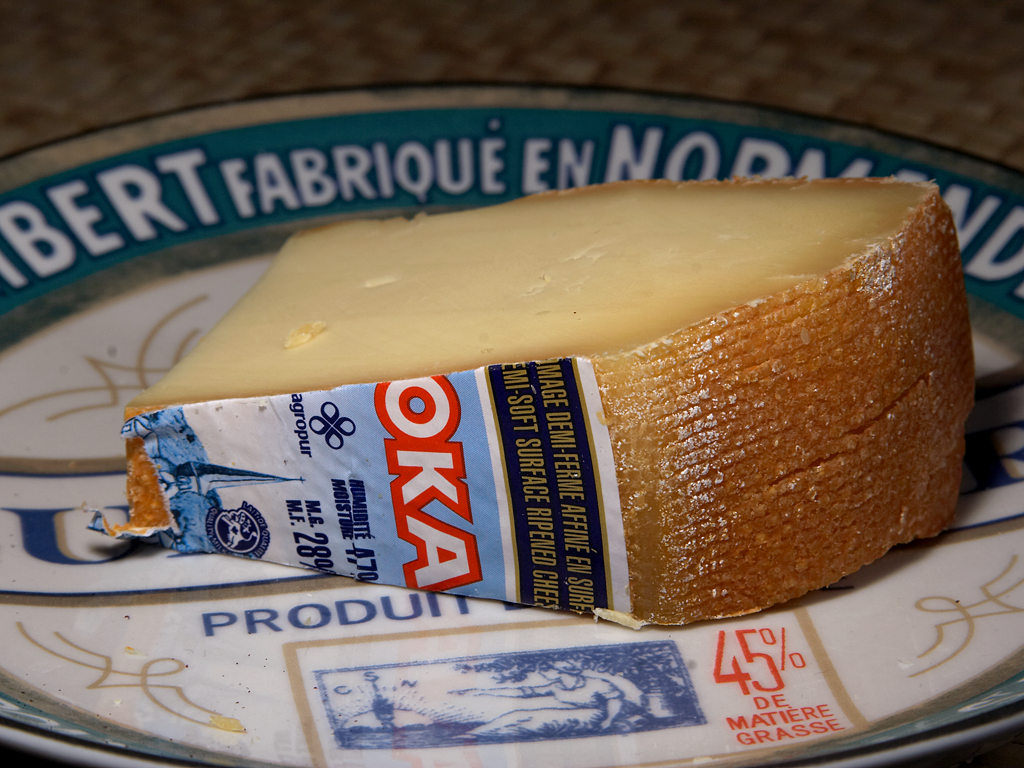
Oka cheese was originally manufactured in the Trappists monasteries of Oka, Quebec and Holland, Manitoba

Dairy products became prominent among Central Canadian producers in the 1860s. Ontario's first cheese factory opened in 1863, and by the end of the decade, they had expanded to over two-hundred. The 1860s also saw to the start of a shift from wheat production to dairy and livestock in Quebec, which would become the dominant agricultural sector in the province by the early 20th century. Cream and cheese factory production would begin to increase exponentially in both Central and Eastern Canada by the 1880s.

Canada is currently the 9th largest producer of cheese by tonnage, and is considered to be one of the major cheese-producing countries. Canadian cheese is mostly "firm", with cheddar and mozzarella being the most produced varieties in 2020. Among Canadians, specialty cheese (such as cream cheese, cottage cheese, and parmesan) is the most popular type, with cheddar being the second-most.

=== Commercially prepared food, condiments and beverages ===
- Baby food
  - Love Child Organics
  - Pablum
  - Pure Organic Baby Food
  - Mother Hen
- Bread
  - Brands (bakeries): Ben's, Bon Matin, Dempster's, POM, Stonemill, Villaggio
  - Canadian white bread, simply referred to as "white bread" in Canada, is distinct from its international counterparts due to the high protein content of Canadian wheat, as required by the Canadian Grain Commission, which gives it a heartier consistency.
- Candy/sweets
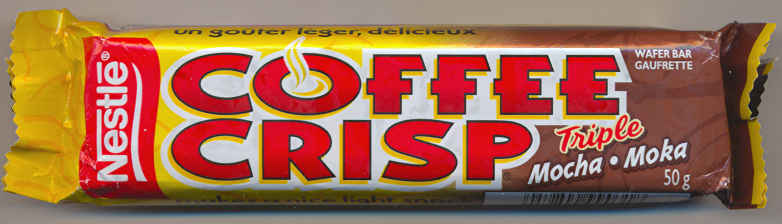
  "Coffee Crisp", introduced in 1938, was originally designed to be a Canadian variation of "Rowntree's Wafer Crisp".
  - Chocolate bars: Coffee Crisp, Mr. Big, Caramilk, Big Turk, Cherry Blossom, Crunchie, Crispy Crunch, Aero, Pal-o-mine, Oh Henry!, Eat-more Chocolate bar
  - Chocolate candy: Bridge mixture, Smarties, Glosette pieces (peanut, raisin, or almonds)
  - Toffee: Templeman's Toffees, Two Brothers Toffee, Canadian Mackintosh's Toffee
- Cereal
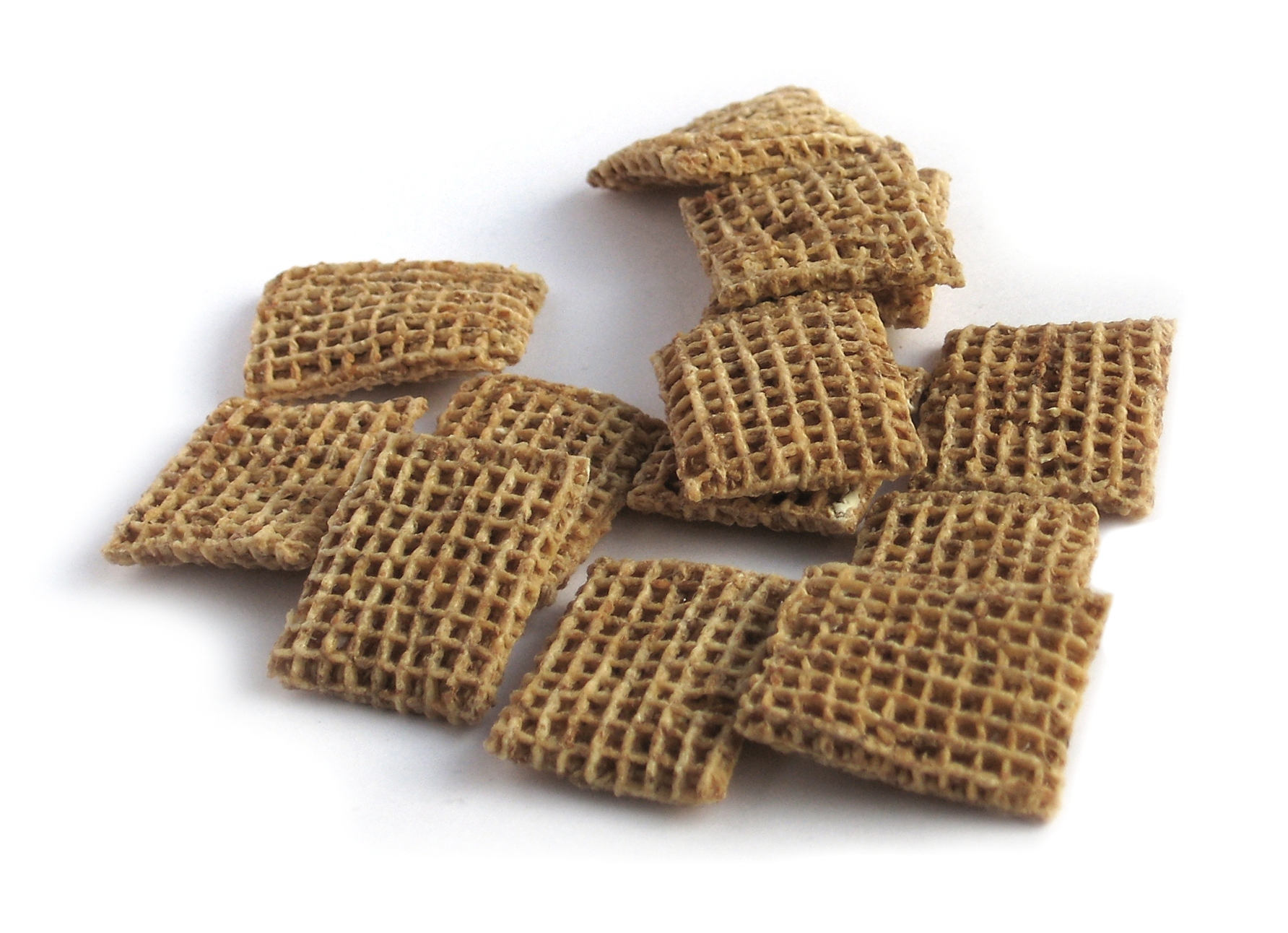
  "Shreddies" breakfast cereal was first produced in 1939 in Niagara Falls, Ontario, where it is still produced with 100% whole grain wheat.
  - Anita's Organic Mill
  - Daybreak Mill
  - Fieldstone Organics
  - Holy Crap
  - MadeGood Foods
  - Red River Cereal
  - Shreddies
  - Sunny Crunch
  - Vector
- Coffee—Canada is the 10th-highest coffee consumer, per capita, in the world.
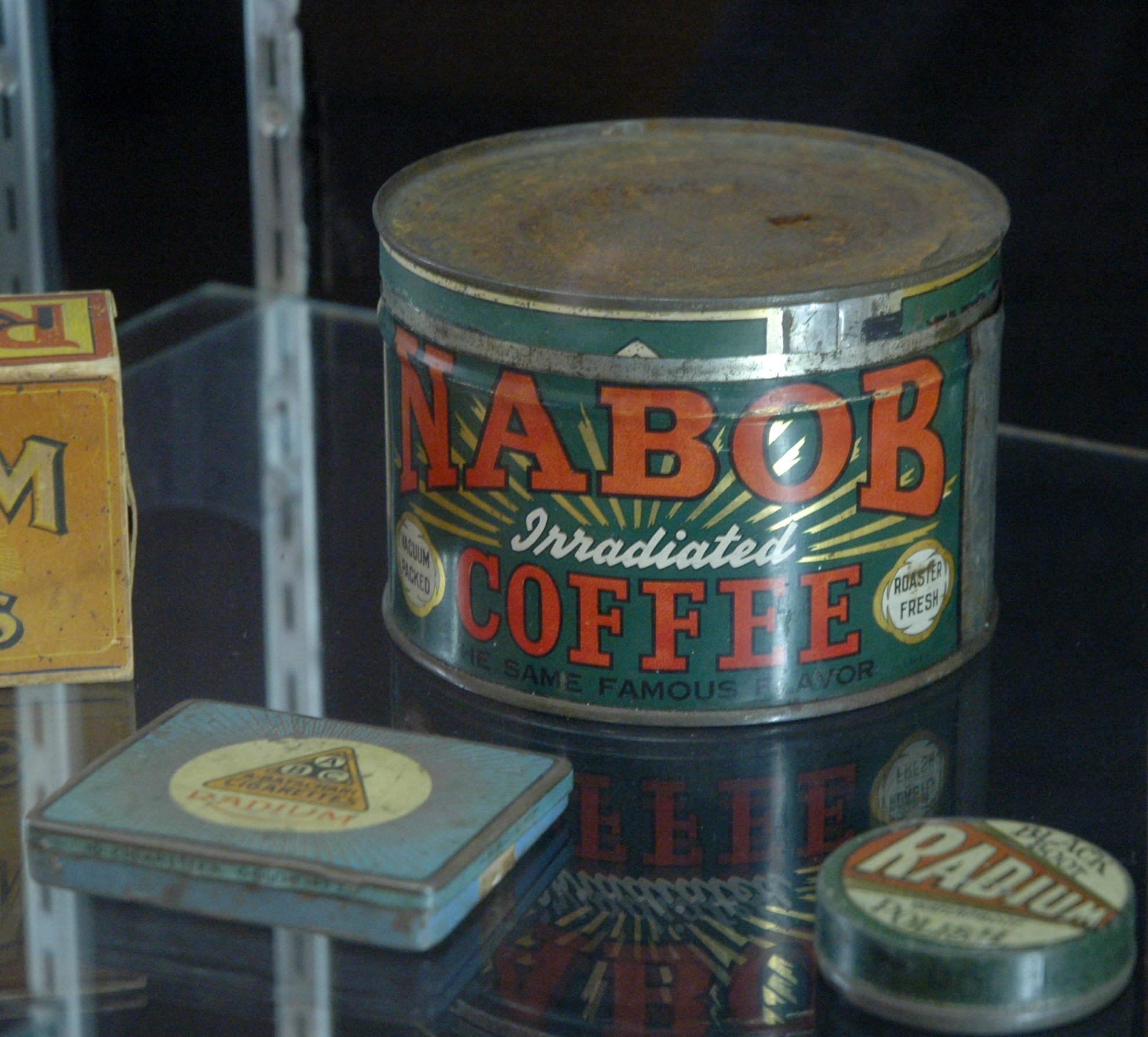
  The Nabob Coffee Company, from Vancouver, has sold coffee in Canada since 1896
  - Brands: 49th Parallel Coffee Roasters, Kicking Horse, Nabob Coffee, Second Cup, Tim Hortons, Van Houtte, among numerous smaller brands.
  - Canadian coffee—a blend of coffee, rye whisky, and maple syrup, often with whipped cream.
- Coffeehouses and doughnut shops
  - Baker's Dozen Donuts
  - Coffee Time
  - Country Style
  - Robin's Donuts
  - Second Cup
  - Tim Hortons
- Condiments
  - Chow-chow
  - Cretons
  - Honey dill sauce
  - Honey garlic sauce
  - Maple butter
  - Maple syrup
  - Montreal steak seasoning
  - Peanut butter—Marcellus Gilmore Edson was the first to invent the manufactured product in 1884
  - Windsor Salt
- Fast food
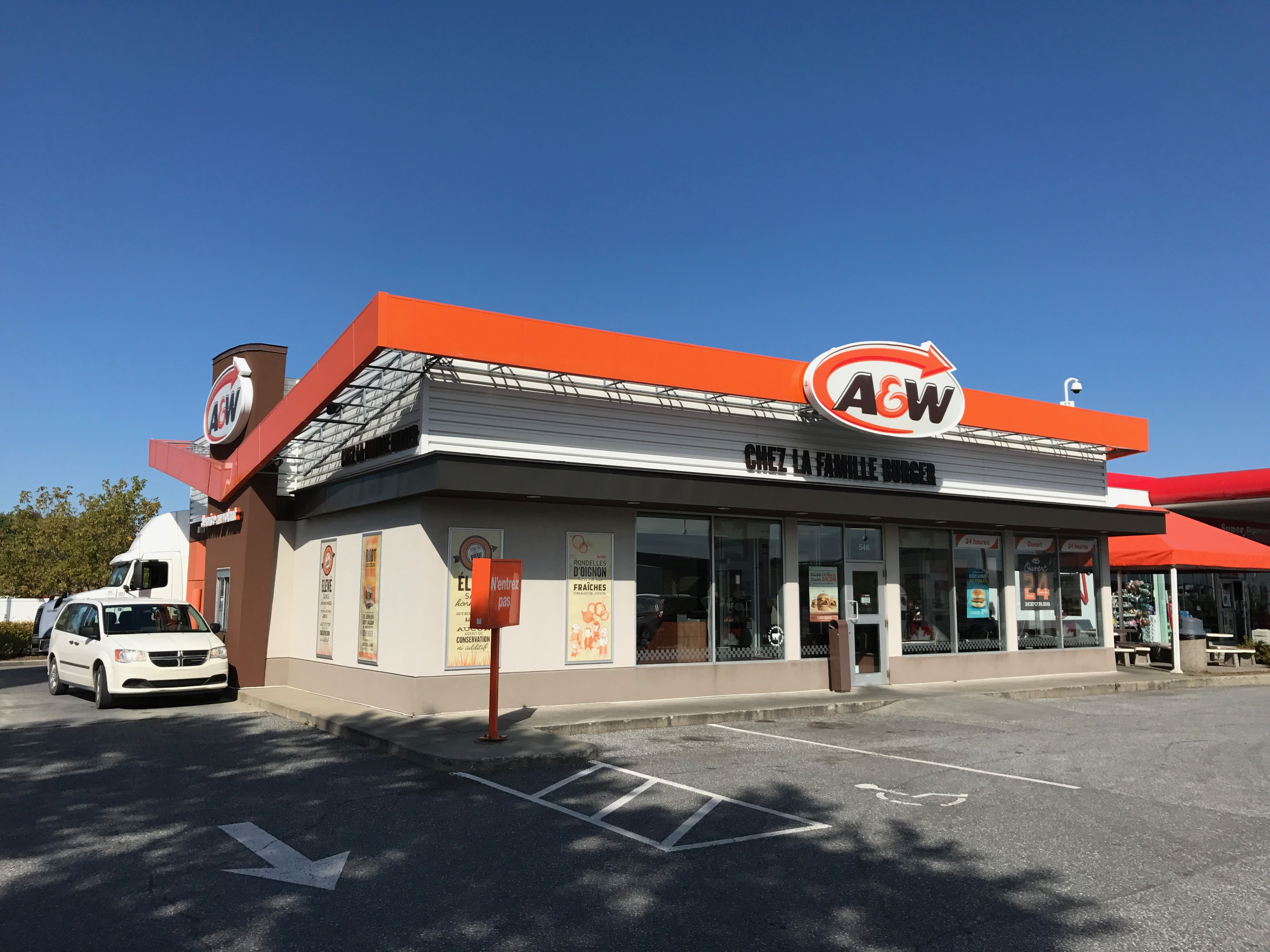
  A&W restaurant in Sainte-Hélène-de-Bagot, Quebec. "A&W Food Services of Canada", now headquartered in North Vancouver, was once part of the U.S.-owned A&W Restaurants, but has been Canadian-owned since a management buyout in 1995.
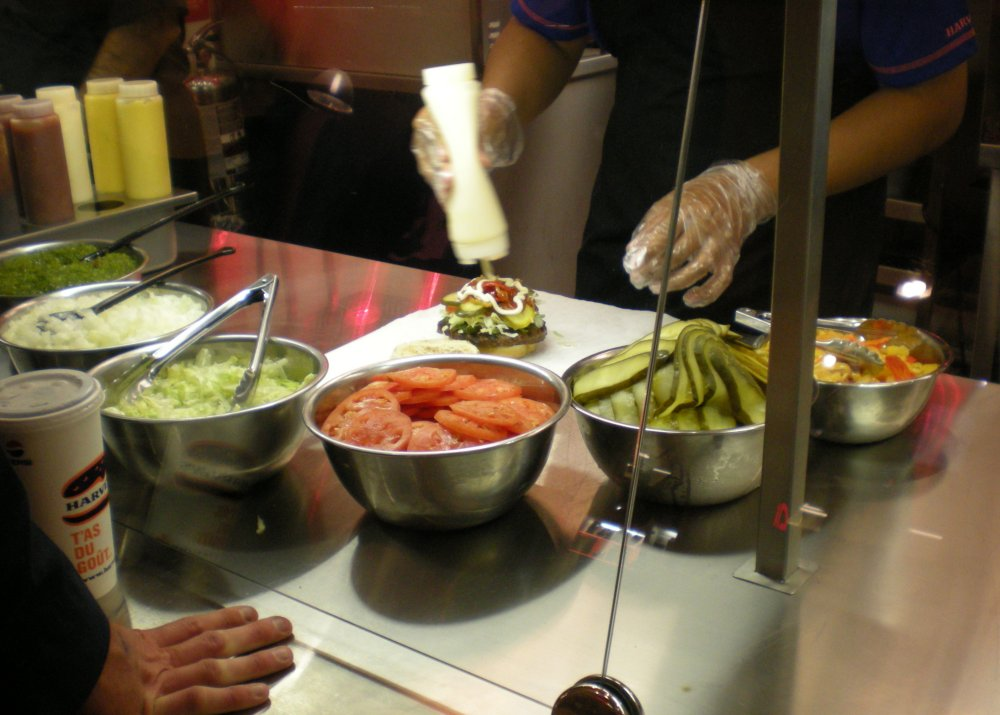
  Employee at a Harvey's restaurant franchise garnishing a hamburger by instruction of the customer
  - A&W (Canada)
  - Burger Baron
  - Edo Japan
  - Extreme Pita
  - Harvey's
  - Manchu Wok
  - Mr. Sub
  - Mucho Burrito
  - Pita Pit
  - Taco Time
  - Thai Express
  - Triple-O's
- Ice cream
  - Chapman's
  - Cows ice cream
  - Dickie Dee
  - Kawartha Dairy Company
  - Laura Secord
  - Neilson Dairy
  - Swensen's
- Miscellaneous distributors and brands
  - Agropur dairy brands, including Natrel
  - Kraft Dinner (also a proprietary eponym)
  - Lactalis Canada dairy brands, including Black Diamond and Cracker Barrel
  - Maple Leaf Foods meat products
  - Nature's Path organic food products, including breakfast cereal, granola, and oatmeal
  - "No Name" food brand
  - Overwaitea Food Group brands, including Western Family
  - President's Choice food brand
  - Saputo Inc. dairy brands, including Dairyland Canada
  - Tim Hortons non-coffee products, such as "timbit" cereal, tea, soup, and granola bars
- Non-alcoholic drinks
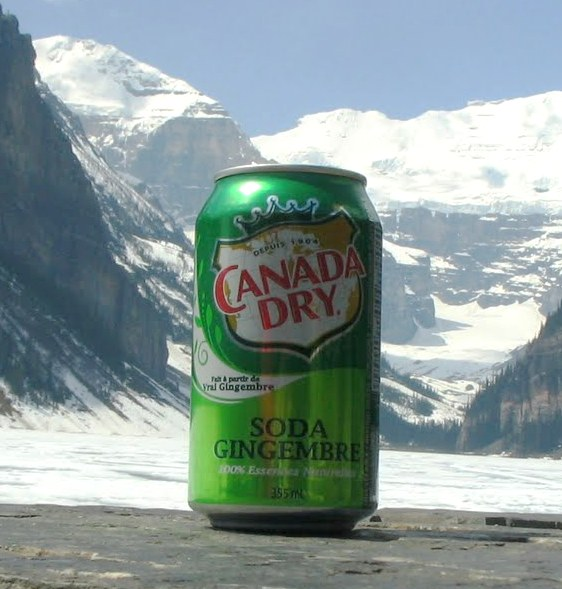
  Can of Canada Dry ginger ale at Lake Louise, Alberta. "Dry" ginger ale was developed by John J. McLaughlin in 1904.
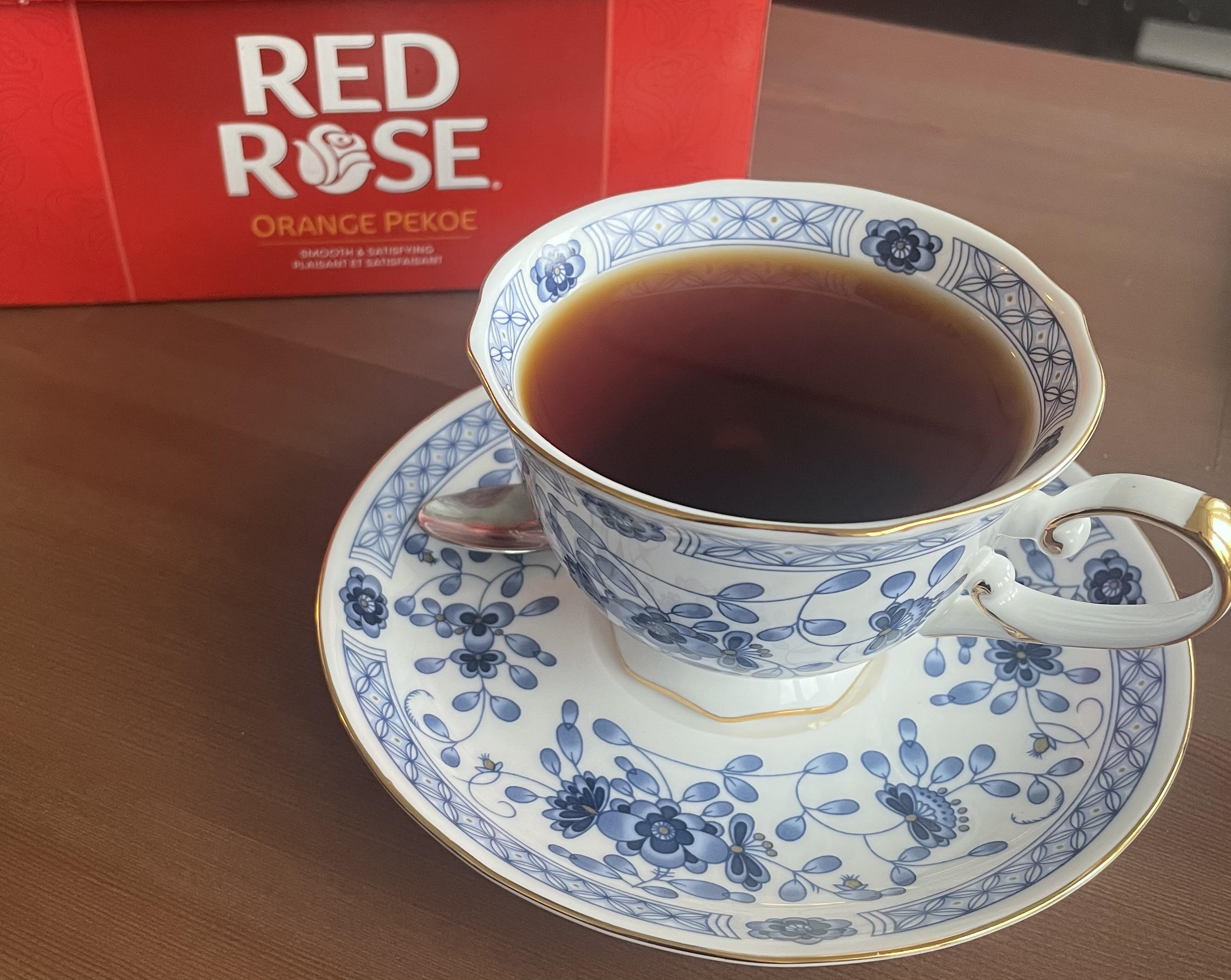
  Red Rose "orange pekoe" tea. The Red Rose Tea company was founded in Saint John, New Brunswick in 1894, and is currently headquartered in Toronto.
  - Bagged milk
  - Brio chinotto
  - Canadian tea—various tea varieties grown and developed in the Chemainus River valley
  - DavidsTea
  - Ginger ale (Canada Dry and Sussex Golden)
  - Iced Capp
  - Labrador (or Hudson's Bay) tea
  - London Fog
  - Red Rose Tea
  - Spruce beer—bière d'épinette, non-alcoholic soft drink from Quebec
- Pizzerias
  - 241 Pizza
  - Boston Pizza
  - Freshslice Pizza
  - Gabriel Pizza
  - Greco Pizza Restaurant
  - King of Donair
  - Mikes
  - Mother's Pizza
  - Panago
  - Pizza 73
  - Pizza Delight
  - Pizza Nova
  - Pizza Pizza
  - Pizzaiolo
  - Topper's Pizza
- Snacks
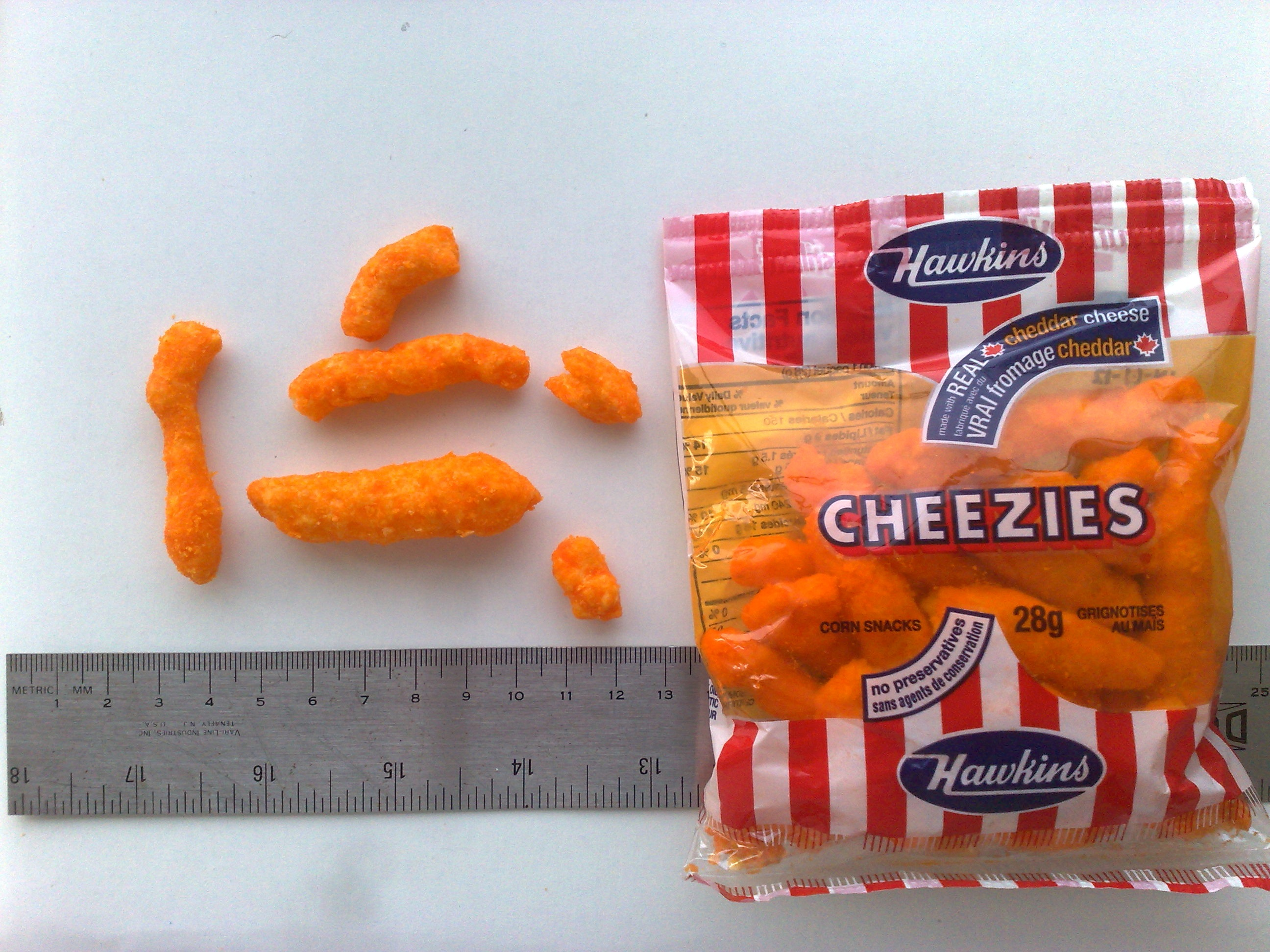
  Hawkins "Cheezies" have been produced in Belleville, Ontario since 1956
  - Dare Foods snack foods, such as Whippets and Wagon Wheels
  - Hawkins Cheezies
  - Hostess Potato Chips
  - Ketchup, salt and vinegar, dill pickle, and "all dressed" flavoured potato chips
  - Miss Vickie's kettle-cooked chips
  - Nuts and Bolts aka Chex Mix
  - Pizza Pops
  - Ringolos and Humpty Dumpty Party Mix
  - Vachon Bakery snack pastries, such as Jos Louis and May West cakes

== Alcohol ==
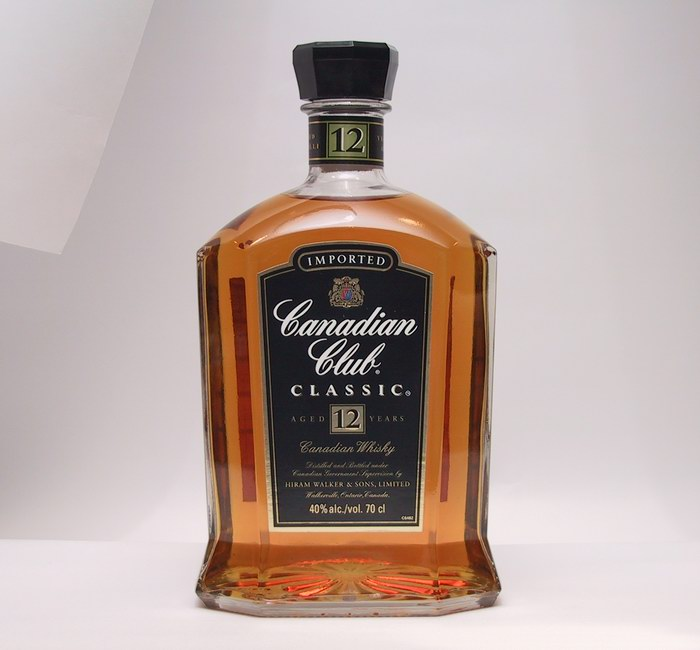
Bottle of 12-year Canadian whisky

Canada is considered one of the top whisky-producing countries, and is most renowned for rye whisky. Regulation states that Canadian whisky must age for a minimum of three years and be kept in oak barrels. Canada houses about thirty whisky distilleries across the country, and produces 54.2 million liters. Canadian whisky is noted for its light and smooth style, and though most of it is blended, single-malt and 100% rye are some of the country's most desired. The Glenora Inn & Distillery is the only single-malt distillery in North America.

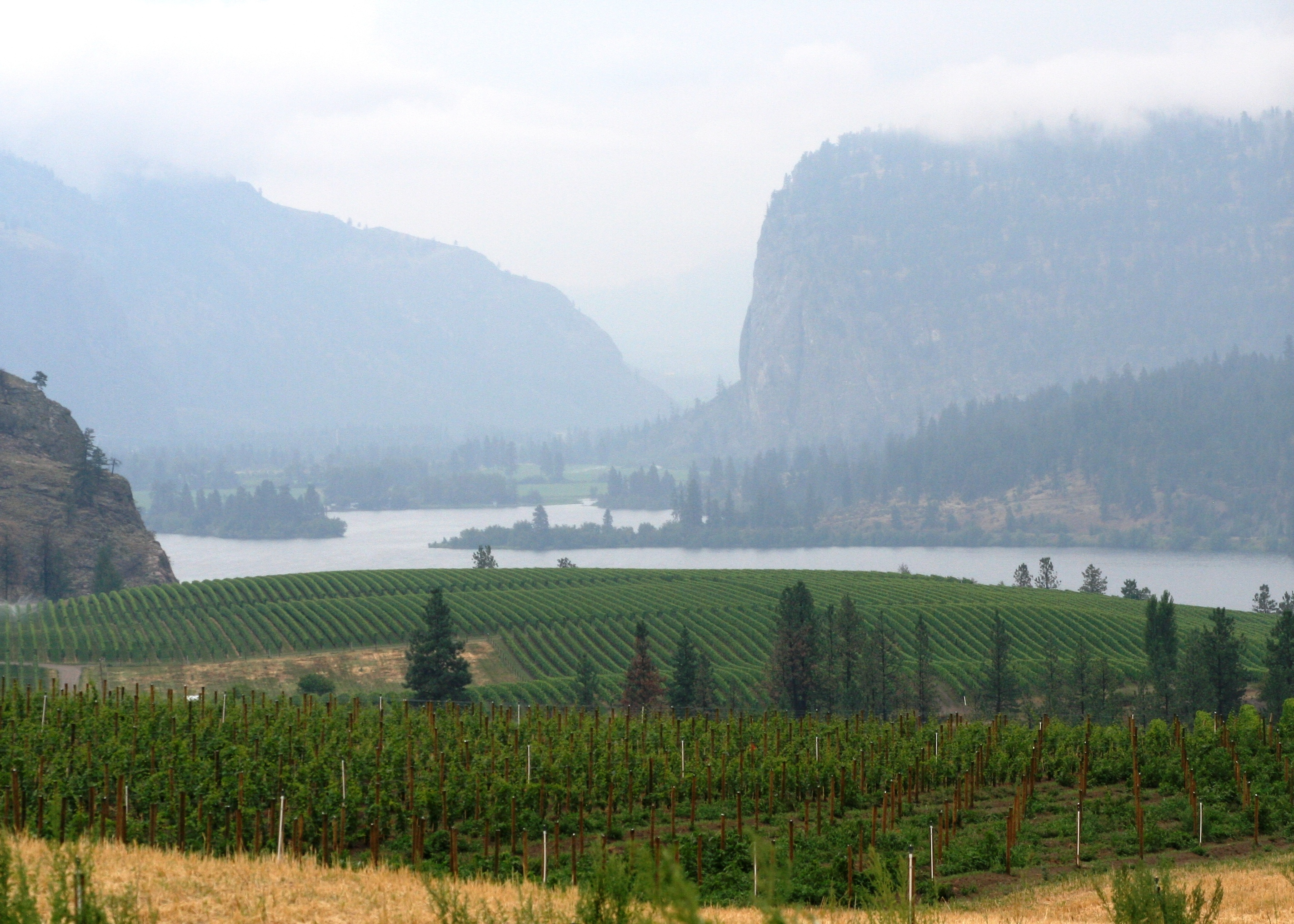
Blue Mountain Vineyard in Okanagan Falls, British Columbia

Canada's wine industry is over two-hundred years old and includes the wine regions of British Columbia, Ontario, Quebec, and Nova Scotia. Canada's first commercial vineyard, the Pelee Island Winery, was established in 1866. There are currently over eight-hundred licensed wineries in the country, with the most recognized wine-producing areas being southern Ontario (most notably the Niagara peninsula), and the Okanagan valley of British Columbia.

=== Straight ===
- Acerum
- Alcohol Global 94%
- Canadian beer
  - Brands (breweries): Alexander Keith's, Stanley Park Brewing, Kokanee beer, Labatt, Molson Canadian, Moosehead Breweries, Sleeman Breweries, among others.
  - Cream Ale
  - Ice beer
- Canadian whisky, commonly referred to as "rye".
  - Alberta Premium
  - Black Velvet
  - Canadian Club
  - Crown Royal
  - Forty Creek
  - Glen Breton
  - Gooderham and Worts
  - J.P. Wiser's Whisky
- Canadian wine
  - Brands (wineries): Burrowing Owl Estate, Henry of Pelham Winery, Inniskillin, Mission Hill Family Estate, Quails' Gate Winery, among others.
  - British Columbia wine
  - Ice wine
- Granville Island Sake
- Ice cider
- Newfoundland Screech
- Yukon Jack—a Canadian liqueur made of whisky and honey

=== Mixes ===
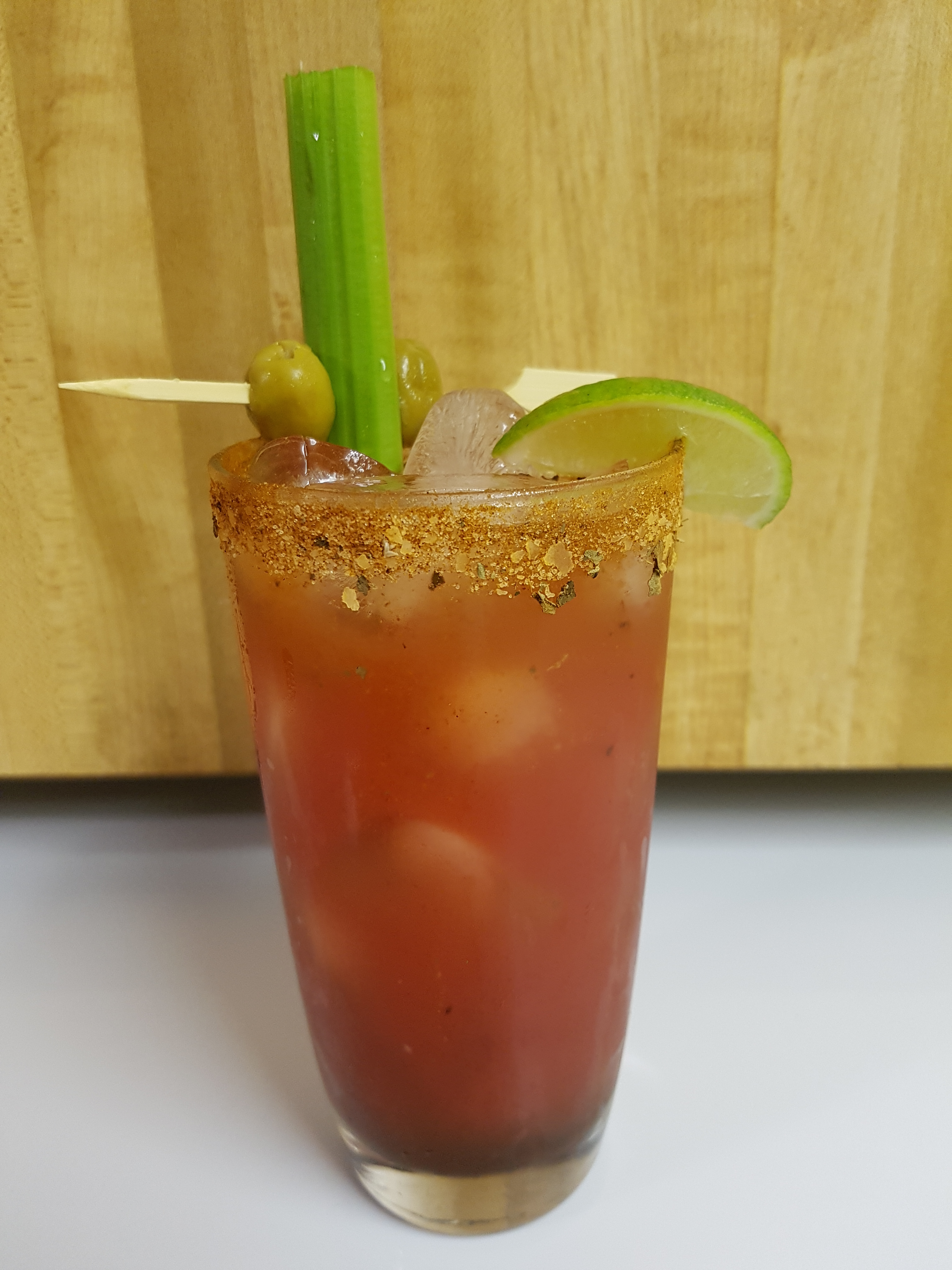
The "Caesar" is a uniquely Canadian cocktail, invented in Calgary

- Angry Canadian—a variety of the Old Fashioned, made with a combination of Canadian rye whiskey, bitters, club soda or water, and pure maple syrup
- The Caesar—originally called the Bloody Caesar, is a cocktail made from vodka, clamato juice (clam-tomato juice), Worcestershire sauce, and Tabasco sauce, in a salt-rimmed glass (table salt or celery salt), and garnished with a stalk of celery, or more adventurously with a spoonful of horseradish or a shot of beef bouillon. The Caesar was invented in 1969 in Calgary, Alberta, by bartender Walter Chell, to mark the opening of a new restaurant, "Marco's".
- Canadian blueberry sour—a mix of rye whisky, blueberry liqueur, and maple syrup.
- Caribou—a mix of red wine, maple syrup, and Canadian whisky; consumed during winter festivals in Quebec
- Donald Sutherland—a combination of Canadian rye whiskey and drambuie, prepared with both ingredients poured into an ice-filled old-fashioned glass, then stirred
- Mahogany—a combination of Jägermeister, Benedictine, dry vermouth, and cinnamon tincture, prepared with a cocktail glass coated with the cinnamon tincture or cinnamon schnapps
- Maple liqueur—sold bottled as Sortilege, this drink combines Canadian whisky and maple syrup
- Moose Milk—a cream and spirit (usually rye whisky and dark rum) drink served and consumed at celebratory events of the Canadian Armed Forces
- The Queen Mary—beer mixed with grenadine, with maraschino cherries dropped into the glass as a garnish
- Raymond Massey—a mix of whisky, ginger syrup, and champagne. Named after the Toronto actor.
- Rye & Ginger—Canadian whisky and ginger ale
- The Toronto—a dry, rich, and mildly bitter cocktail consisting of Canadian whisky, Fernet-Branca, angostura bitters, and either sugar or simple syrup
- A Shaft—a mix of vodka, coffee liqueur, Irish cream, and chilled espresso, originating from Hugo's Bar at the Strathcona Hotel in Victoria, BC.

== Street food ==
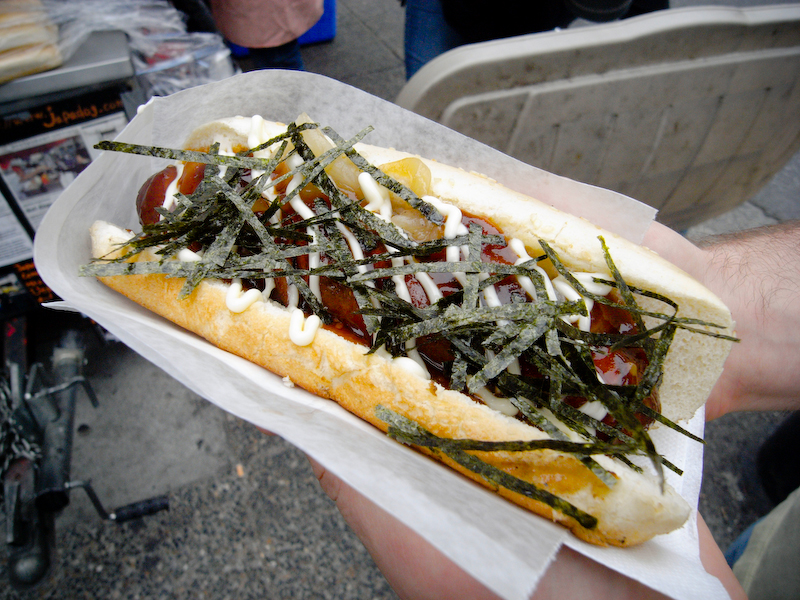
"Terimayo" from the Japadog street cart on Burrard Street and Smithe, Vancouver

Street food in Canada varies by city and region, and is commonly shaped by local immigrant communities, municipal vending rules, and seasonal public events. In major cities, street-food offerings include food trucks, carts, market stalls, and festival vendors, with examples ranging from hot dogs, pizza slices, shawarma, falafel, tacos, burgers, and ice cream trucks to East Asian, South Asian, Filipino, Vietnamese, Middle Eastern, and fusion foods.

Municipal regulation of street food also varies across the country. In Toronto, street vending rules regulate the sale of food, drink, and ice cream from motorized and non-motorized vending vehicles on city highways; operators of motorized or non-motorized refreshment vehicles require a business licence, while vendors operating on public property require a separate street-vending permit. In Calgary, a municipal business licence is required for mobile food services including food trucks, food trailers, bicycle food vendors, pushcarts, hot dog carts, and ice cream trucks; full-service food trucks may operate on both city streets and private property, subject to additional requirements. In Halifax, the municipal food-vending licence system includes food service vehicles, food stands, and bicycle wagons.

Regional examples include Montreal food trucks offering shish taouk, the Montreal hot dog, and falafel; Vancouver street foods influenced by East Asian cuisines, including sushi, samosas, Vietnamese banh mi or pho, Filipino offerings, and Japanese and Chinese cuisines; and Victoria offerings such as vegan and vegetarian burgers, seafood take-away, and Mexican-influenced street food. In Western Canada, a version of the Ukrainian garlic-pork sausage referred to as "kubasa", a corruption of the Ukrainian sausage "kobasa", is widely available. The term "smokies" or "smokeys" may refer to kubasa rather than frankfurters.

Fusion street foods include the Japadog, which tops a hot dog with Japanese ingredients such as wasabi, teriyaki, shredded daikon radish, or bonito flakes. Shawarma is common in Ottawa and Windsor, while Halifax offers its own version of the döner kebab, the donair, which features a sauce made from condensed milk, sugar, garlic, and vinegar. Winnipeg has had food truck vendors on Main Street, and Lebanese Canadian fast-food restaurants such as Boustan offer a version of poutine called shawarma poutine, which features shawarma meat on top.

== National food of Canada ==
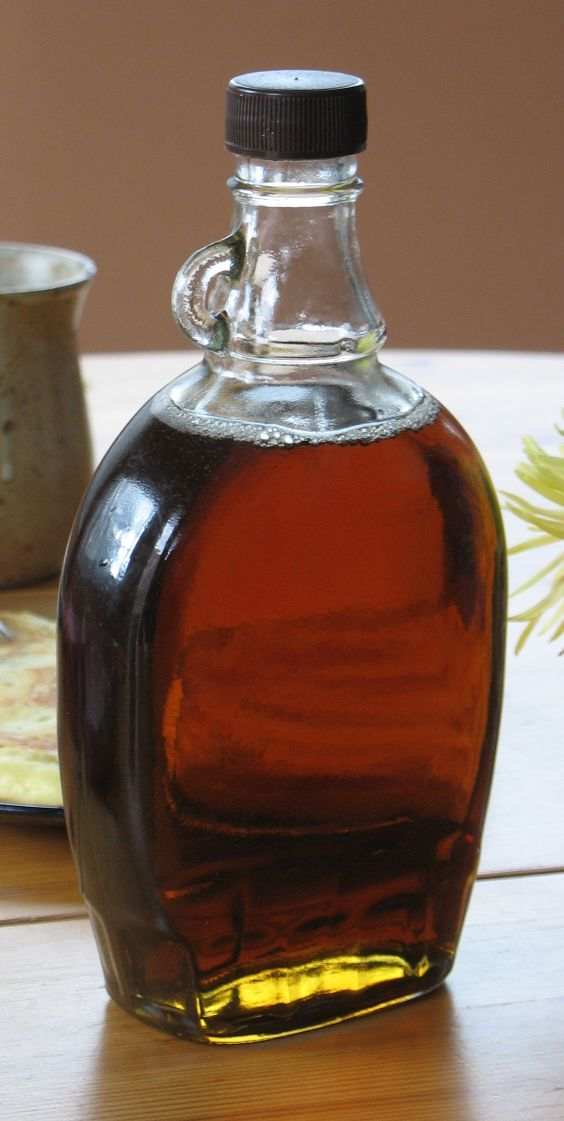
Maple syrup is widely recognized as emblematic of Canada, both internationally and within the country itself

Though finding consensus among Canadians in determining a national food or dish can prove difficult, there are nonetheless several items broadly recognized as being representative of Canada's national cuisine. Foods typically considered national dishes of Canada include poutine and butter tarts. Canadian back or peameal bacon, as well as Atlantic or Pacific salmon, are also commonly thought of as representative of Canada.

Published by the Statista Research Department, a June 2015 poll asked Canadians, "If Canada were to identify one of the following as official national food, which should it be?" The results revealed Canadian bacon to be the top choice, followed by poutine:

1. Canadian bacon (35%)
2. Poutine (30%)
3. Atlantic or Pacific salmon (17%)
4. Beavertail (8%)
5. Tourtiere (6%)
6. Doughnut (4%)

CanCulture Magazine conducted a 2021 social media poll that sampled from fifty-five Canadians given ten choices. The poll revealed the following results:

1. Poutine (38.9%)
2. Maple syrup (25.9%)
3. BeaverTails (9.3%)
4. Peameal bacon and Timbits (7.4% each)

According to an informal survey by The Globe and Mail conducted through Facebook from collected comments, users considered the following to be the Canadian national dish, with maple syrup likely above all the other foods if it were considered:

1. Poutine (51%)
2. Montreal-style bagels (14%)
3. Salmon jerky (dried smoked salmon) (11%)
4. Pierogi/Perogy (10%)
5. Ketchup chips (7%)
6. Nova Scotian donair (4%)
7. California roll (1%)

Canada's most "iconic" foods were named in a survey conducted by the Canadian Broadcasting Corporation, in the summer of 2012, as:

1. Maple syrup
2. Poutine
3. Nanaimo bars, smoked salmon and butter tarts

In 2020, Hayley Simpson identified the "best signature Canadian dishes" as poutine, Nanaimo bars, butter tarts, beavertails, tourtière, pea soup, Halifax donair, Saskatoon berry pie, and Montreal-style bagels. The following year, Reader's Digest published an article similarly listing "10 Must-Try Canadian Dishes" as poutine, Canadian bacon, caesar, beavertails, Canadian pizza, butter tarts, Nanaimo bars, split pea soup, tourtière, and "ketchup...on everything".

== Meal formats ==
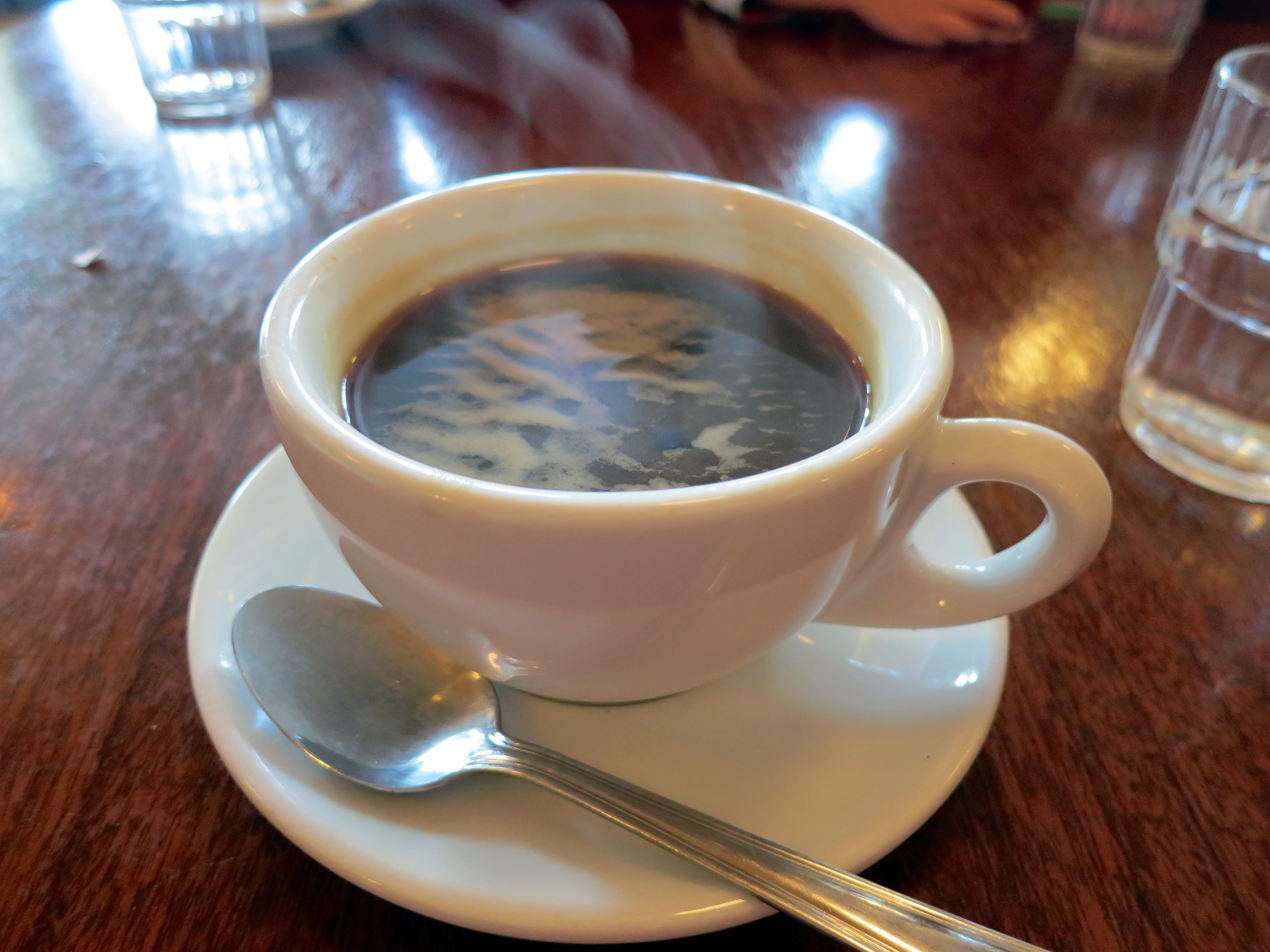
Coffee from Pronto Café in Vancouver. Canada is the 10th largest consumer of coffee in the world, consuming more coffee per capita than any other English-speaking country.

As in other countries, Canadian meals are commonly segmented accordingly to their suitability for the time of day.

Breakfast takes place in the morning and typically consists of a variety of foods, such as toast, biscuits, muffins, scones, pancakes, bacon, bagels, cereals, fruit and eggs, among others. Breakfast condiments are very common and can often include an assortment of jam, cream cheese, peanut butter, marmalade, or Nutella. Typical drinks include water, juice, coffee, and tea. Breakfast traditionally occurs before work or school on weekdays, or otherwise soon after waking up in the morning. An archetypal French-Canadian meal may contain more starch-based material, while an English-Canadian meal might consist of more protein.

- Lumberjack's breakfast, also known as logger's breakfast or "the lumby"—a gargantuan breakfast of three-plus eggs, rations of ham, bacon and sausages, and several large pancakes. This was invented by hotelier J. Houston c. 1870, at his Granville Hotel on Water Street in old pre-railway Gastown, Vancouver, in response to requests from his clientele for a better "feed" at the start of a long day of work.

Coffee customarily refers to a small meal during a break from labour. This involves the consumption of a snack that, although it is the typical drink of choice (hence the name), may or may not include coffee. The Canada Labour Code requires employers to provide 30-minute breaks for every five consecutive hours of work.

Lunch generally takes place around noon. Sandwiches, soups, fruit, nuts, cheese and a variety of snacks are common foods during this meal. Lunches are usually compact, utilitarian, and/or casual, particularly given that they are often eaten at work, school, or otherwise outside of the home.

Dinner usually takes place from anywhere between 17:00 to 19:00, and tend to be heartier affairs based around protein and vegetables. Local flora and fauna are most fully realized during dinner; in the Maritimes, dinner may be more likely to include fish, while the Prairies might include more beef.

- Sunday dinner in Canada is commonly observed as a more formal affair than typical dinners, often involving family and/or guests, and a more thoroughly prepared meal. Roast beef is a common centerpiece, but particular specialties also vary by region, such as traditional Prairie pot roast and Newfoundland Jiggs dinner.

=== Occasions ===
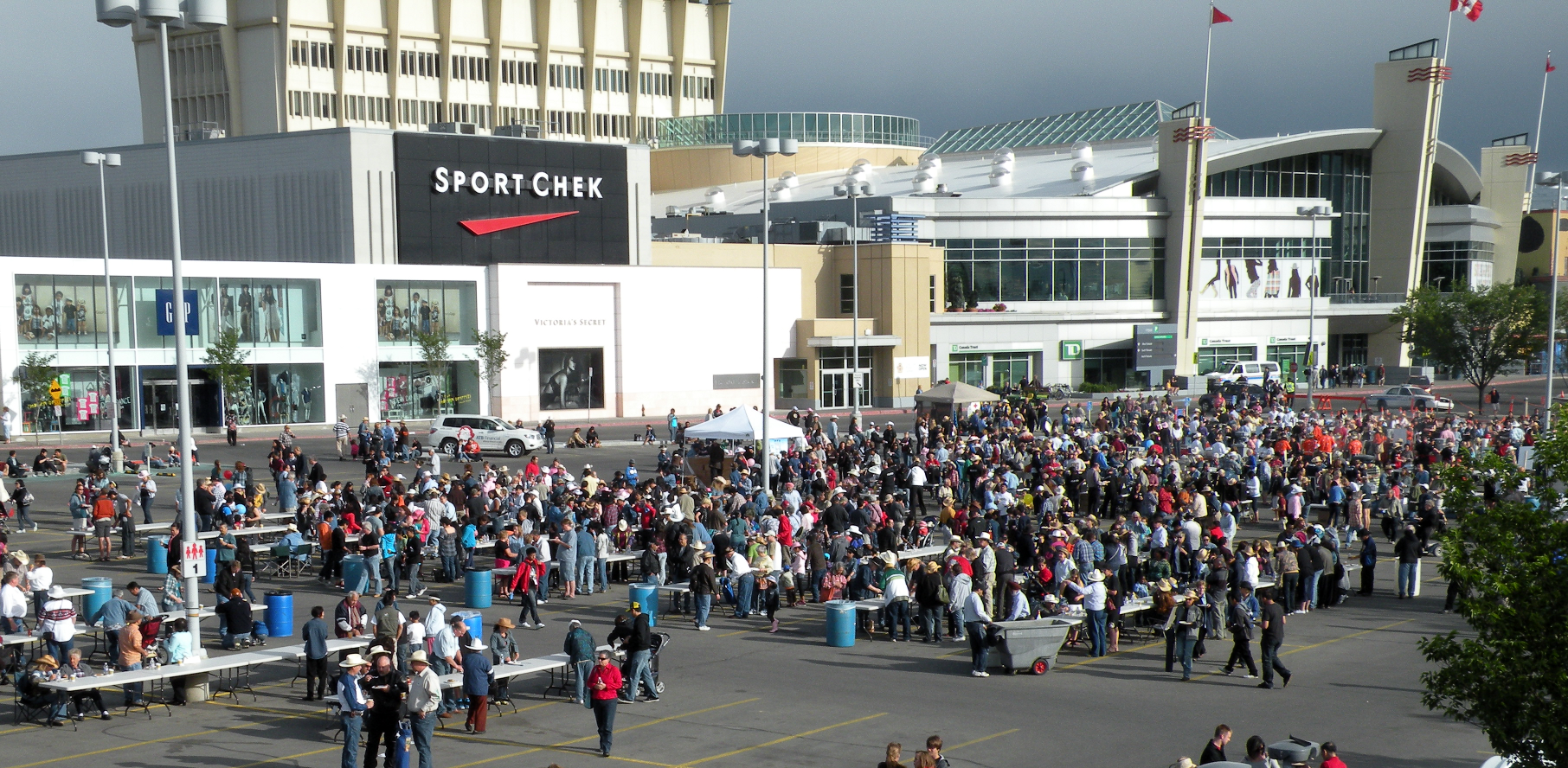
The annual pancake breakfast at the Chinook Centre in Calgary feeds over 60,000 in one day.

- Chinese buffet or smorgasbord is a particular meal system invented in Gastown, Vancouver and prevalent throughout the country. This style of buffet was developed in the 19th century by Chinese immigrants in order to cater to the local clientele of Scandinavian Canadian loggers. Staples of Chinese-Canadian cuisine, as well as North American Chinese cuisine broadly, such as ginger beef, chow mein, and dumplings, are commonly available.
- Christmas dinner in Canada draws from the traditions of both Britain and France. These dinners are typically meant to serve a larger group than is usual, with the pièce de résistance often being turkey, roast beef, and/or ham. Sides often include stuffing, mashed or roast potatoes, gravy, cranberry sauce, and cooked vegetables (such as carrots or yams). Pies and cakes are common desserts. Treats during the Christmas season typically include tarts, shortbread and gingerbread, bar, square, and "snowball" pastries, toffee, roll kuchen (particularly in the Prairies), crème brûlée, and biscotti. Easter weekend (April), Victoria Day weekend (May), and Canadian Thanksgiving (October) tend to share certain culinary customs with Christmas, albeit with different ingredients based on seasonality.
- Pancake breakfast is a traditional public meal, particularly in Western Canada, which takes place during festivals, celebrations, and community events. This tradition has roots in the Prairies' ranching culture, as well as the Christian tradition of Shrove Tuesday. Such events that take part in a pancake breakfast include the Calgary Stampede, Grey Cup festival, and K-Days.
- Potlatch is a gift-giving feast practiced by Indigenous peoples of the Pacific Northwest. Although the occasion as a whole incorporates complex political, social, and economic elements, feasting is still a central aspect of the practice.
- Réveillon is a long dinner held in the evenings preceding Christmas Day and New Year's Eve, and is a traditional practice for French-Canadians across the country. Meals tend to be particularly opulent, and may include lobster, oysters, escargot, foie gras, and tourtière. A traditional dessert for this occasion is Yule log.

== Food festivals ==
Various food festivals take place annually across Canada and in accordance with seasonality, often in celebration of a local culinary tradition or industry. The list below is a selection of food festivals by region (giving their location and standard month(s) of occurrence), and is not exhaustive.

British Columbia

- BC Seafood Festival (Comox Valley; June)
- Dine Out Vancouver Festival (Vancouver; January to February)
- Eat! Vancouver (Vancouver; May)
- Half Corked Marathon (Osoyoos; October)
- Sun Peaks Winter Okanagan Wine Festival (Sun Peaks; January)
- Surrey Fusion Festival (Surrey; July)

Prairies

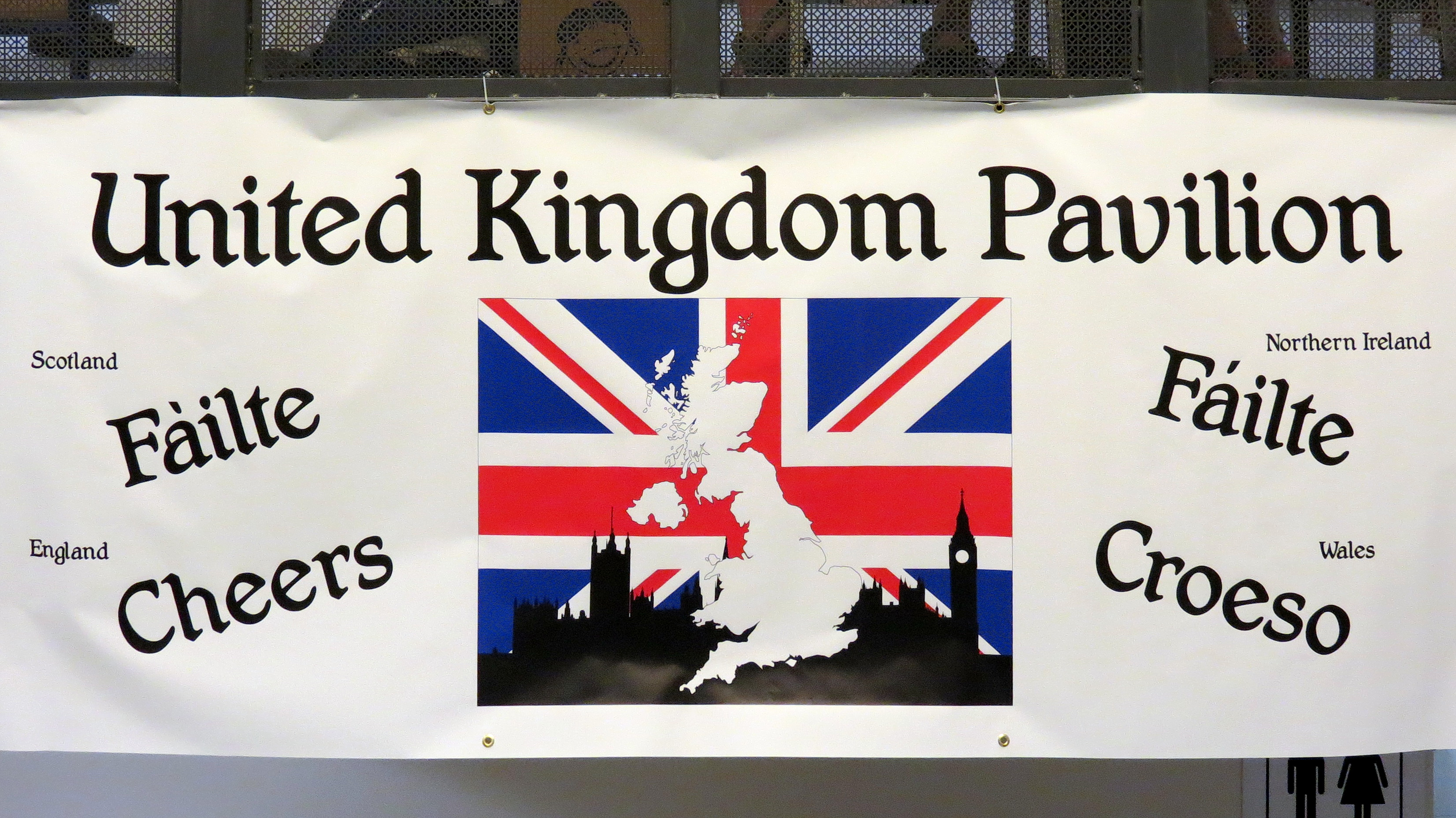
Folklorama UK Pavilion on King Edward St., Winnipeg

- Corn and Apple Festival (Morden; August)
- Folklorama (Winnipeg; July to August)
- Foodtruck Wars (Saskatoon; July)
- Festival du Voyageur (Winnipeg; February)
- Taste of Edmonton (Edmonton; July)
- Edmonton Heritage Festival (Edmonton; First Weekend of August)
- The Big Taste (Calgary; March)
- The Great Saskatchewan Mustard Festival (Regina; August)

Ontario

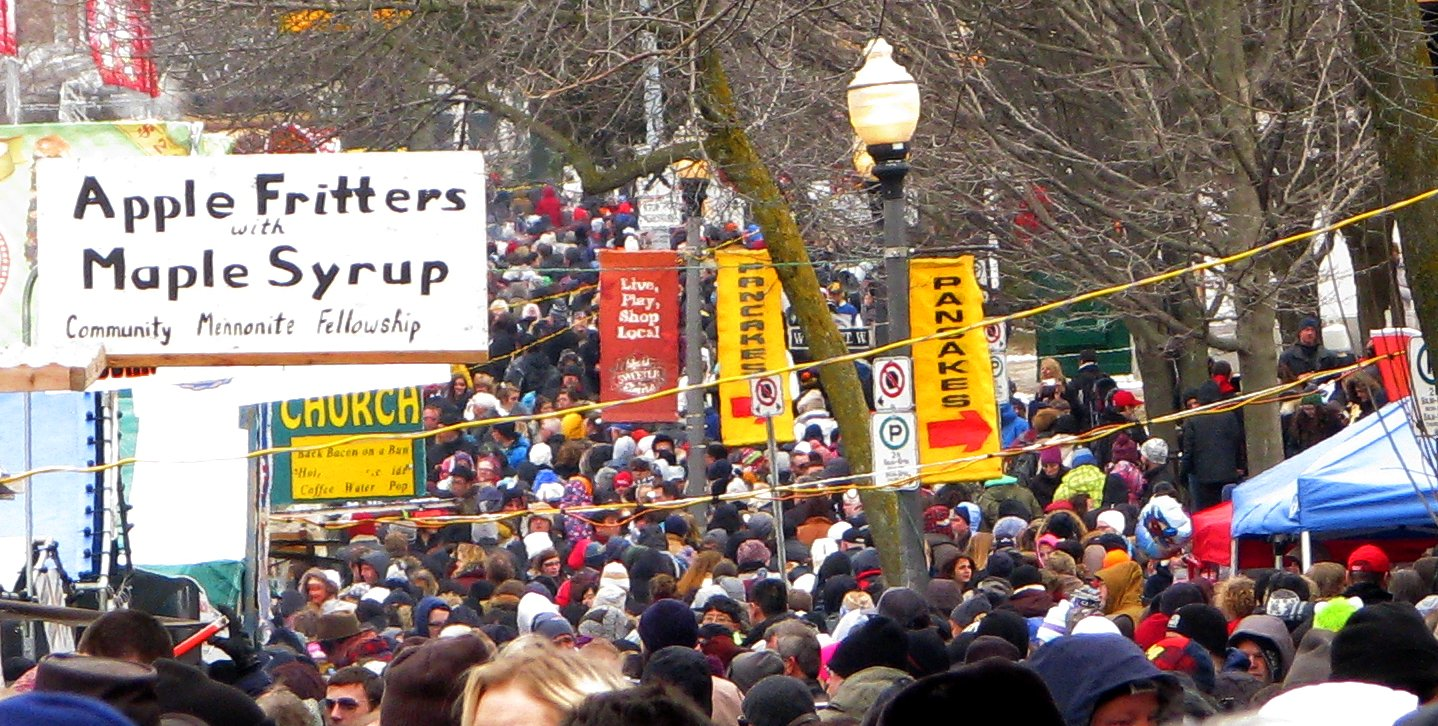
Elmira Maple Syrup Festival, 2014

- A Taste of Niagara-on-the-Lake (Niagara-on-the-Lake; January, March and April)
- Canada's Largest Ribfest (Burlington; August to September)
- Elmira Maple Syrup Festival (Elmira; April)
- Icewine Festival (Niagara-on-the-Lake; January)
- Oktoberfest (Kitchener–Waterloo; October)
- Ontario's Best Butter Tart Festival (Midland; June)
- Ottawa Poutine Fest (Ottawa; October to November)
- Summerlicious (Toronto; July)
- Taste of the Danforth (Toronto; August)
- WinterBrewed (Ottawa; February)
- Winterlicious (Toronto; January to February)

Quebec

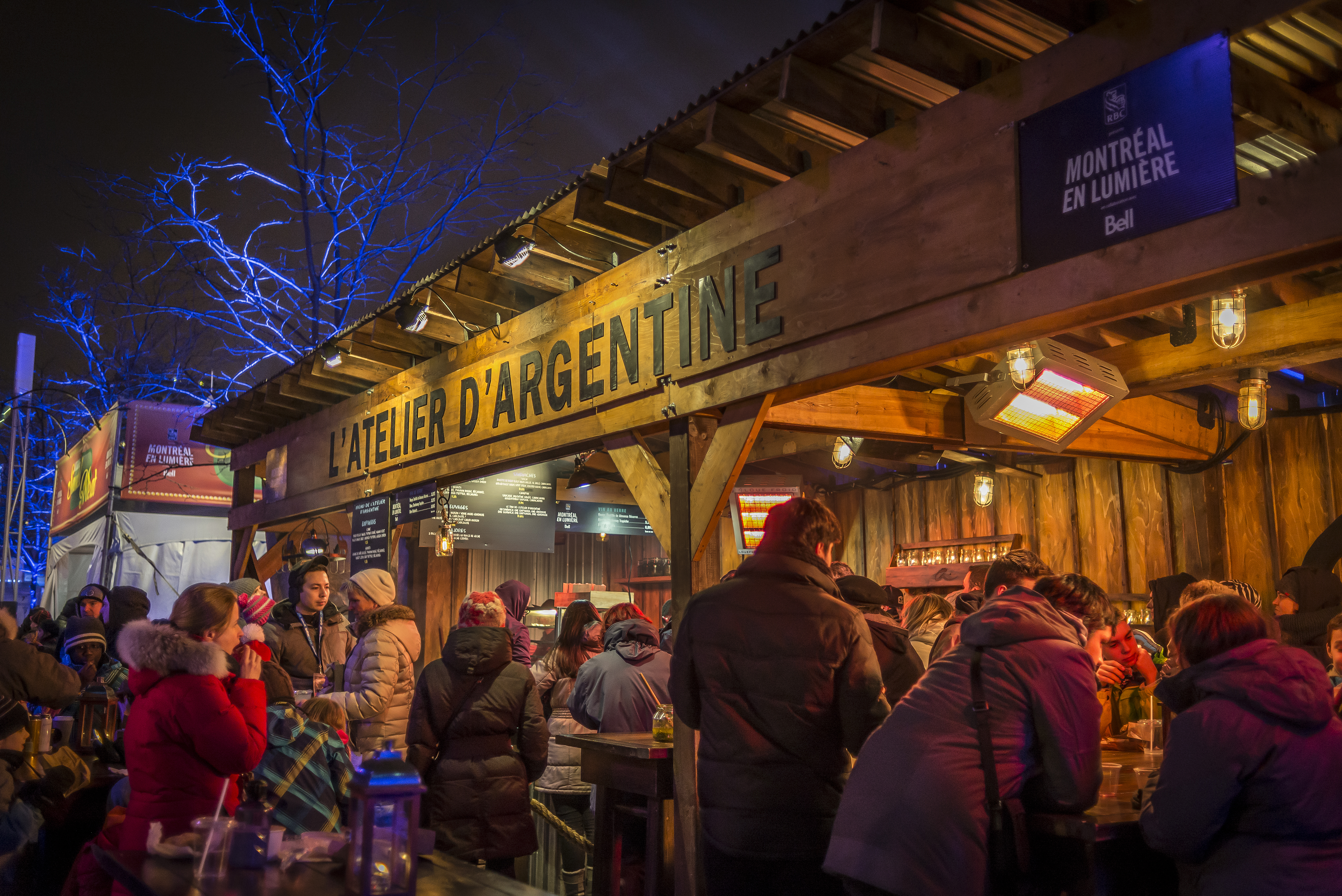
Montréal en Lumière, 2014

- Montréal en Lumière (Montreal; February)
- Festibière de Québec (Quebec City; August)
- Taste of the Caribbean (Montreal; July)

Maritimes

- Dine Around Freddy (Fredericton; March)
- Prince Edward Island Fall Flavours Festival (Charlottetown; September)
- Shediac Lobster Festival (Shediac; June to July)
- The Gathering (Burlington, Newfoundland and Labrador; August)
- WinterDine (Charlottetown; January to February)

North

- Yukon Culinary Festival (Whitehorse; August)

== Livestock breeds and cultivars ==
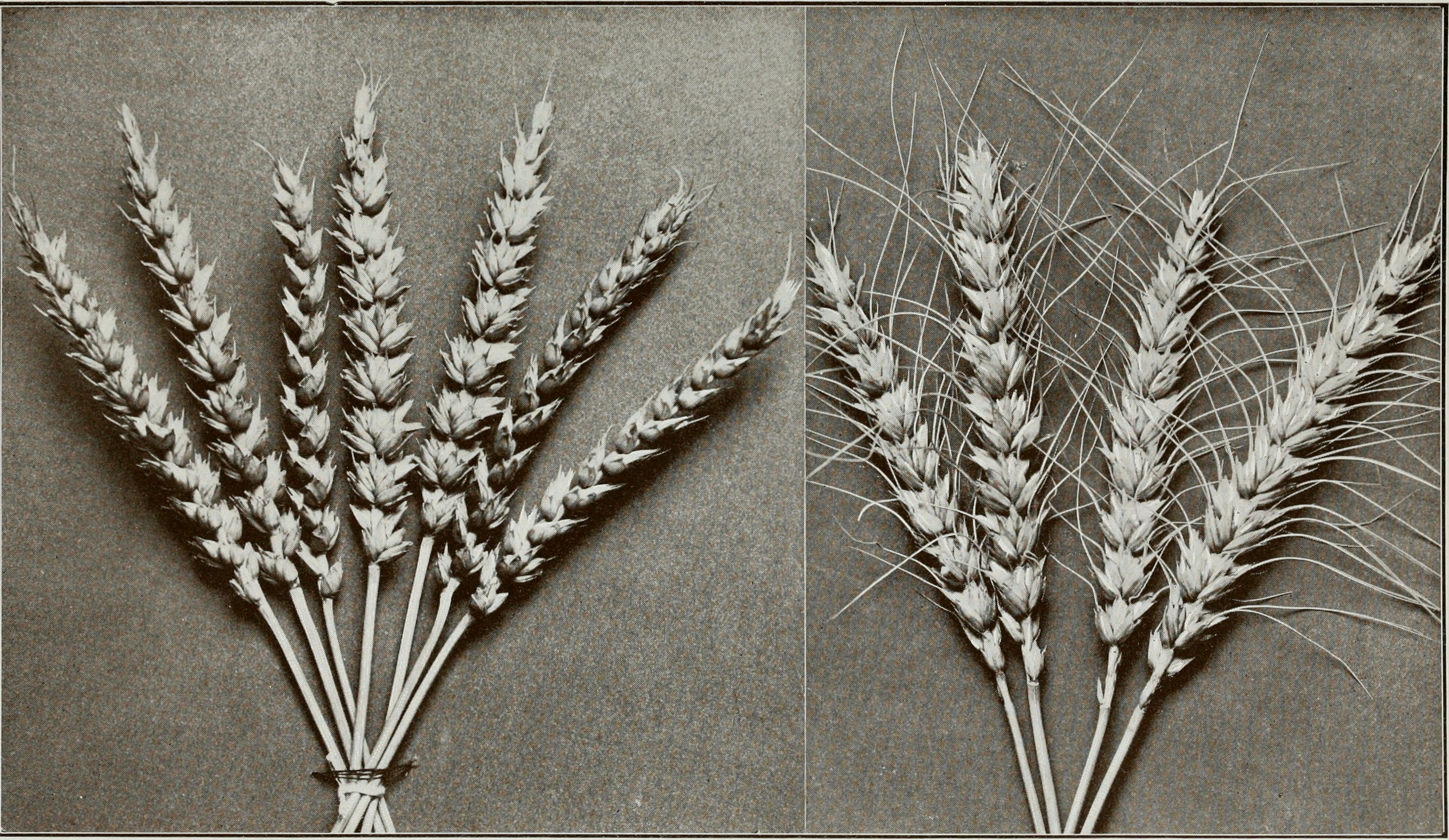
"Marquis" wheat (left) compared to "Preston". The Marquis variety made a marked improvement in maturation speed, harvest efficiency, and winter resilience, and became the basis for all future major wheat strains in Canada.

While an abundance of livestock breeds and crops originating from other countries are grown and raised in Canada, there is also a variety of unique breeds and cultivars that have been developed domestically. Below is a selection of various livestock breeds and cultivars that originate from Canada.

Apples

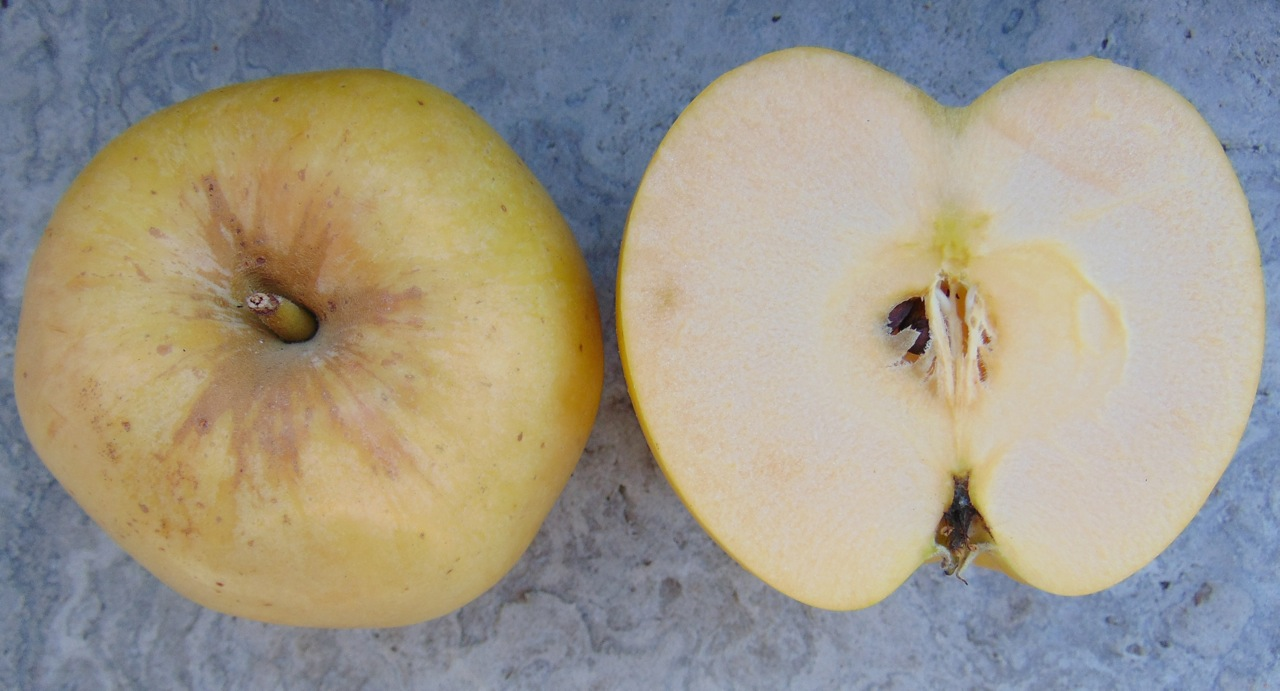
The "Aurora Golden Gala" was created in Summerland, British Columbia at the Pacific Agri-Food Research Centre

Due to an influx of grain from the Prairies into British Columbia during the late 19th century, via the advent of the Canadian rail network, the province's grain production became largely redundant. This allowed for the development of specialized produce industries, such as fruit in the Okanagan. As a result, many of Canada's unique apple varieties have been developed in the interior of British Columbia.

- Ambrosia
- Aurora Golden Gala
- Battleford
- Creston
- Golden Nugget
- Jubilee
- McIntosh
- Melba
- Nicola
- Nova Easygro
- Spartan
- Wijcik McIntosh

Beans

- CDC Blackstrap
- CDC Floral
- CDC Ray
- CDC Sol
- CDC Sunburst
- CDC Whitetrack
- CDC WM-2
- CDC WM-3
- Majesty
- Wolfe

Cattle

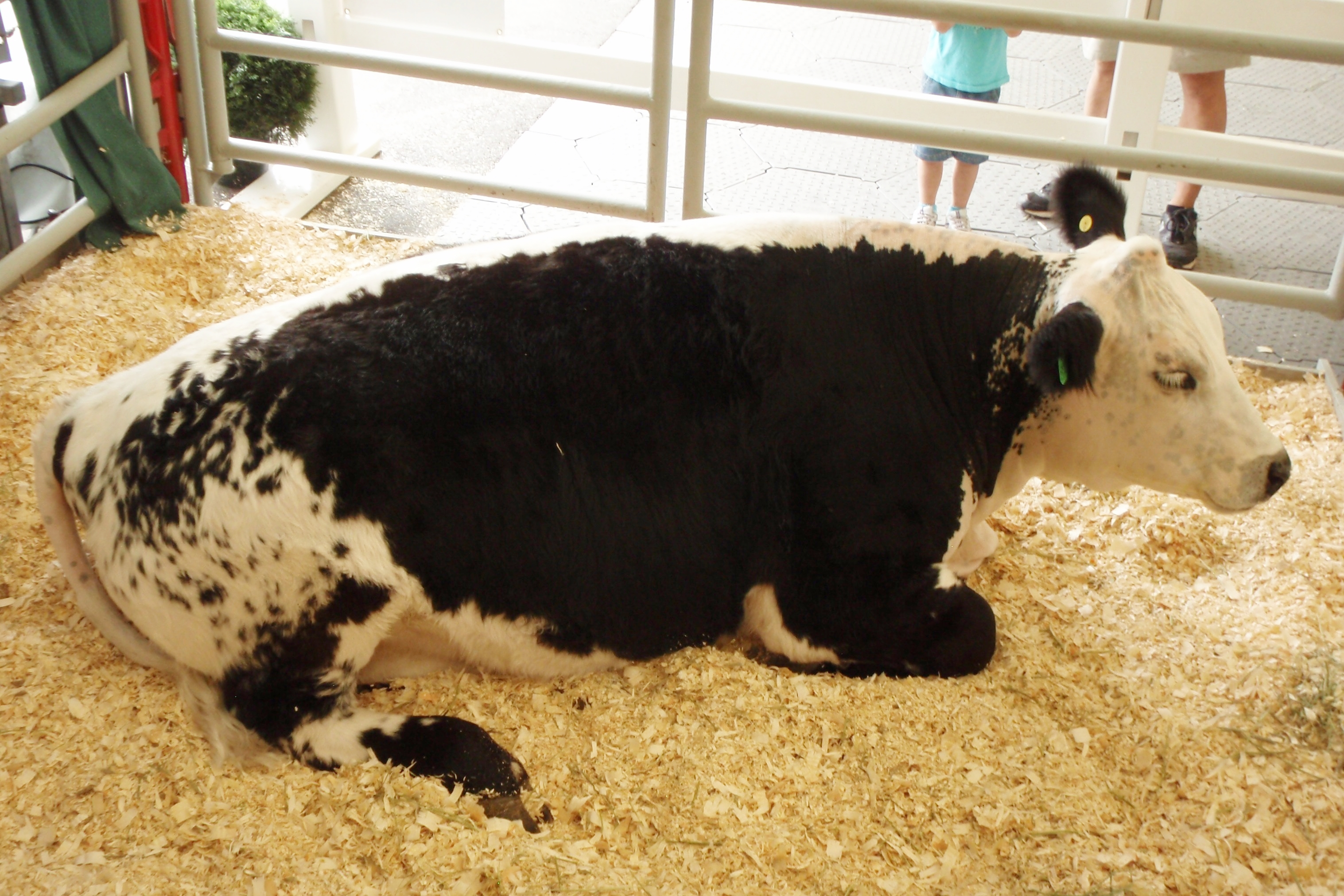
The "Speckle Park" breed of beef cattle was developed in Saskatchewan by cross-breeding the Aberdeen Angus and Shorthorn. The "speckled" pattern for which it is named is derived from a single progenitor bull with the colour-pointed markings of the White Park.

- Canadienne
- Hays Converter
- Lynch Lineback
- Speckle Park

Cherries

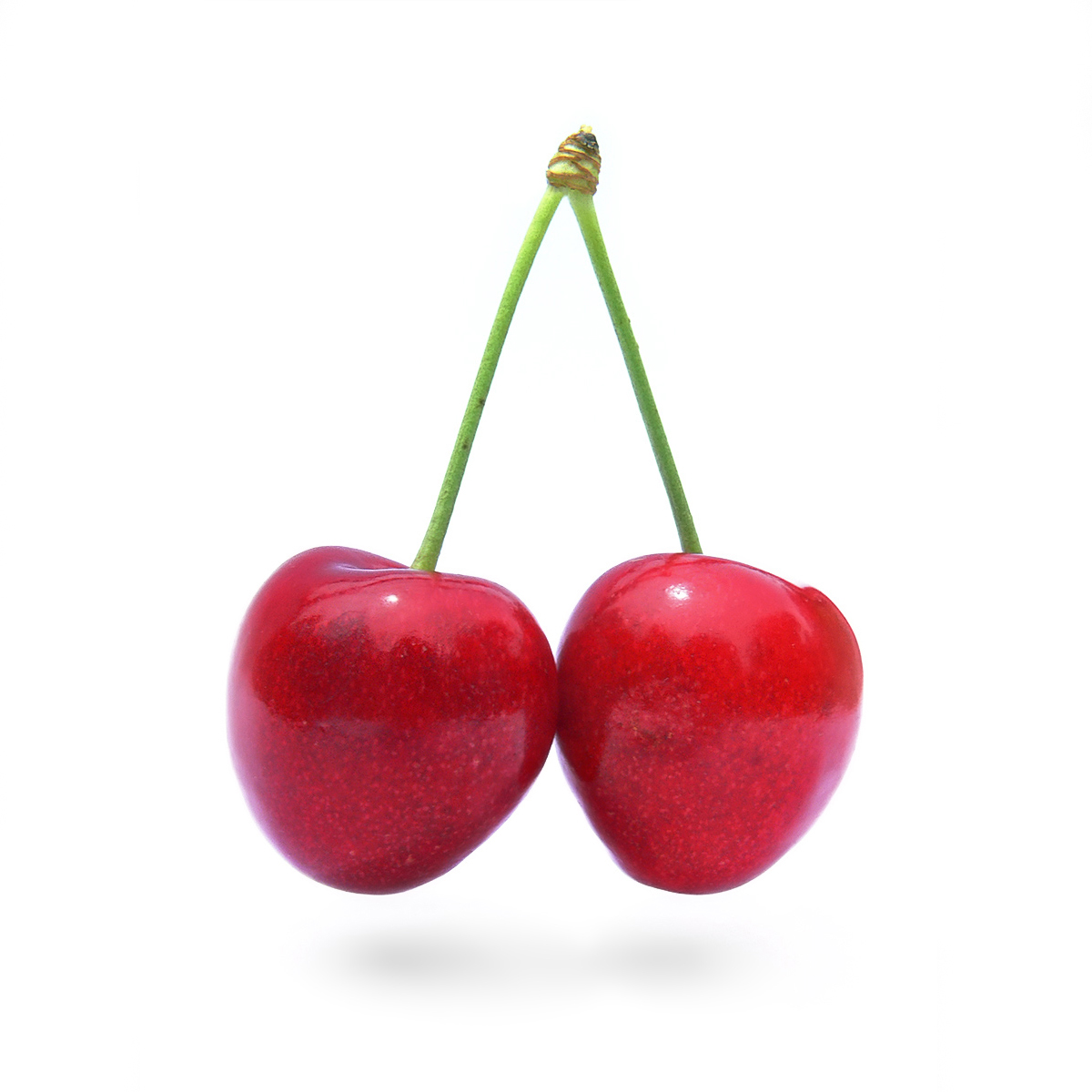
The "Stella cherry" is the first self-fertile sweet cherry to be named and was awarded the Award of Garden Merit by the Royal Horticultural Society.

- Lapins cherry
- Saskatoon Prairie cherry
- Skeena cherry
- Stella cherry
- Sweetheart cherry
- Van cherry

Pigs

- Lacombe
- Miniature, or "Teacup"

Potatoes

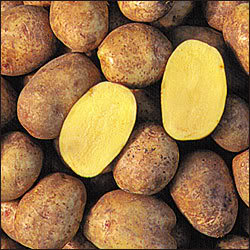
The "Yukon Gold" potato was developed at the University of Guelph

There are over sixty potato varieties that originate from Canada. Many of these were developed by Agriculture and Agri-Food Canada, largely in New Brunswick, but also in Alberta, Newfoundland, Ontario, and Quebec. The following is a small sampling of Canadian potatoes:

- Abeille
- Blue Mac
- Carlton
- Eramosa
- Fundy
- Glenwood Red
- Island Sunshine
- Hunter
- Maple Gold
- Pacific Russet
- Red Gold
- Yukon Gold

Poultry

- Chantecler
- Red Shaver
- Ridley Bronze turkey

Sheep

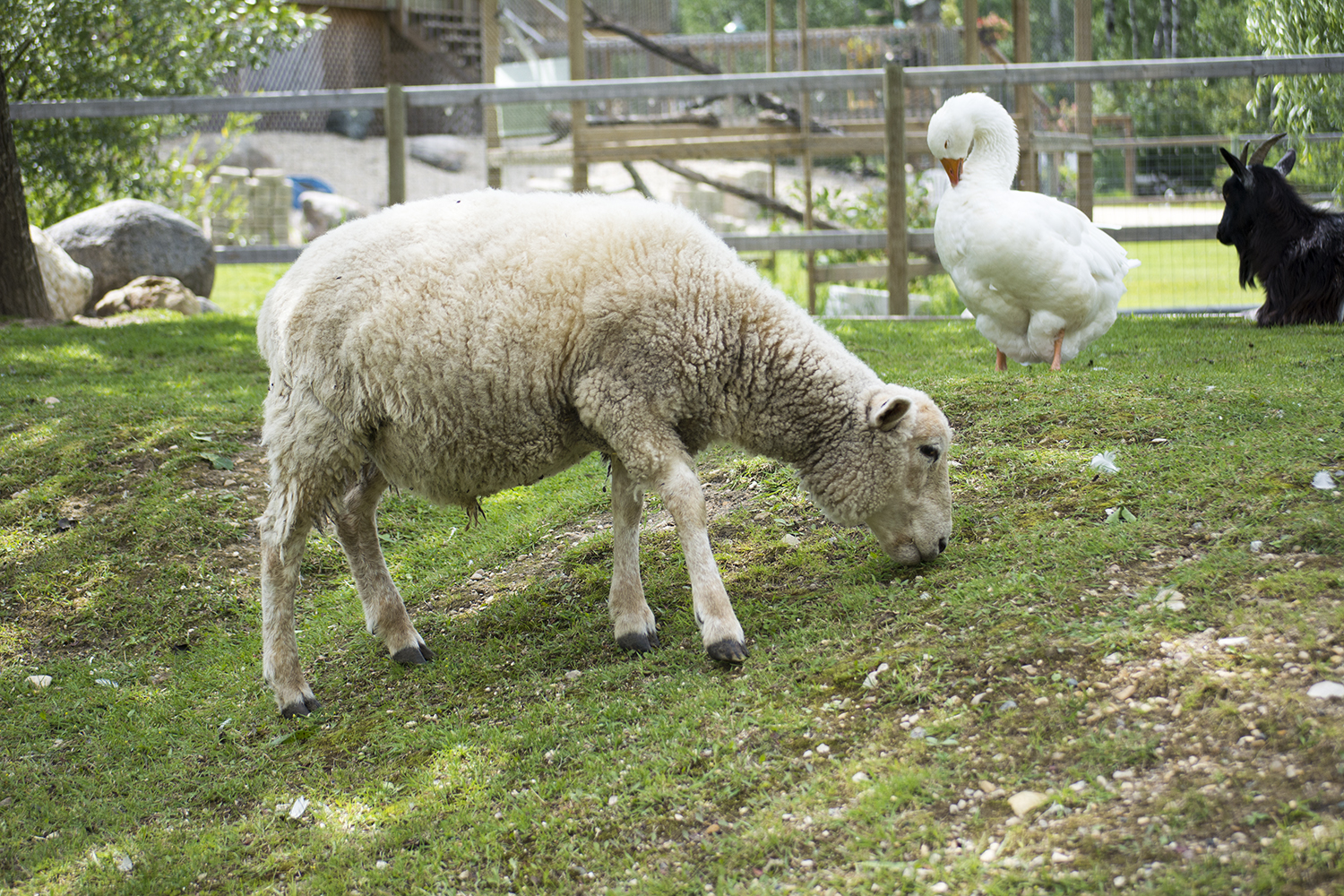
"Canadian Arcott" sheep, as well as the "Rideau" and "Outaouais" Arcotts, were developed at the Animal Research Centre in Ottawa, of which the word "Arcott" is an acronym for.

- Canadian Arcott
- Newfoundland
- Outaouais Arcott
- Rideau Arcott

Strawberries

- Annapolis
- Brunswick
- Cabot
- Cavendish
- Chambly
- Evangeline
- Glooscap
- Kent
- Mira
- R14
- Sable
- Saint Pierre
- Sapphire
- Serenity
- Totem
- Valley Sunset
- Wendy
- Yamaska

Other berries

- Aurora haskap
- Boreal Beauty haskap
- Boreal Beast haskap
- Boreal Blizzard haskap
- Borealis haskap
- Tulameen raspberry

Other breeds and cultivars

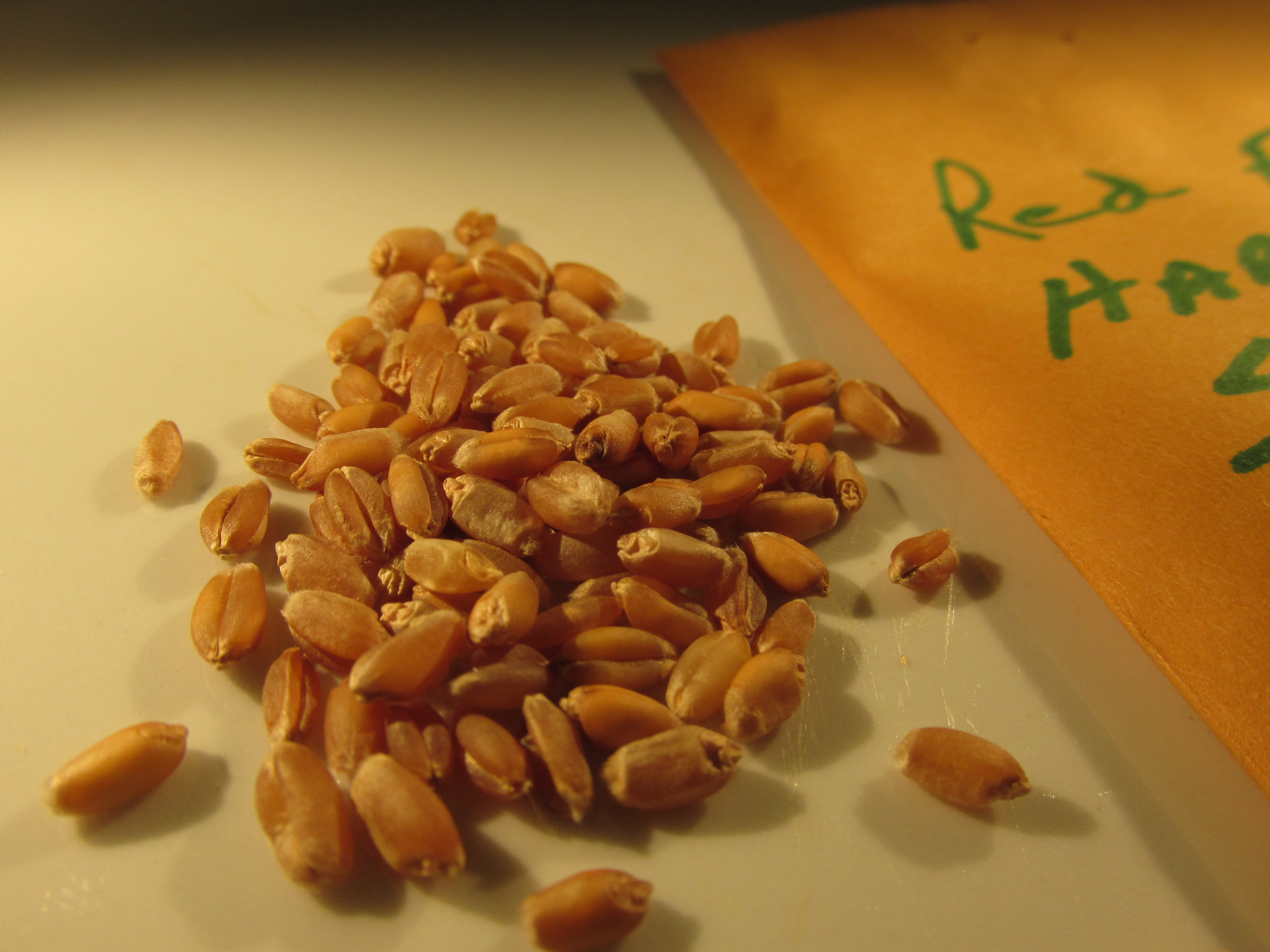
"Red Fife" wheat is named after the colour of its kernel and the Peterborough farmer who developed it, Dave Fife.

- Brookred plum
- Canada Red rhubarb
- Canola
- Coronation grape
- Harrow Crisp pear
- Harrow Sweet pear
- Jedediah Island goat
- Marquis wheat
- Montreal melon
- Red Fife wheat

== See also ==
- Agriculture in Canada
- Canadian Chinese cuisine
- Cuisine of Quebec
- Cuisine of the Maritime Provinces (Canada)
- Cuisine of Toronto
- List of Canadian cookbook writers
- North American cuisine
- Pacific Northwest cuisine
- Rocky Mountain cuisine
