= Skeena cherry =

Late season cherry cultivar from Canada

- Genus: Prunus
- Species: Prunus avium
- Hybrid parentage: 2N-60-7 × 2N-38-22
- Cultivar: Skeena
- Origin: Summerland, British Columbia, Canada

Skeena is a cultivar of cherry originating in Canada.

== Cultivar history ==
The Skeena variety originated as a hybrid of two unnamed cherry hybrids. One of the parent varieties, 2N-60-7, was a hybrid of Van and Stella, while the other parent, 2N-38-32, was a hybrid of Bing and Stella. It was developed in Summerland, British Columbia at the Pacific Agri-Food Research Centre, for the purpose of providing a high-quality late-season cherry that matures about 14-16 days after Van. The cross was made in 1976 and selected in 1984.

== Tree characteristics ==
Trees of the Skeena cherry are vigorous and spreading, with a medium flower density. It is considered significantly easier to manage its habit compared to the Lapins cultivar. Like its Stella ancestor, it is self-fertile. It blooms about 4-5 days later than Bing.

== Fruit characteristics ==
Skeena is considered a late-season cherry, ripening 12-15 days after Bing. Its fruits are large and very firm, with dark red flesh and dark red to black skin. It has a higher cracking resistance than the standard cultivars. However, very high temperatures for several days can cause the fruit to become too soft, leading to post-harvest problems.
