= Rube (disambiguation) =

A rube is a country bumpkin or an inexperienced, unsophisticated, gullible person.

Rube may also refer to:

- Rube (nickname), a list of people and fictional characters
- Auguste Alfred Rubé (1817–1899), French painter
- Jan Rube (born 1952), Swedish former golfer
- Rube, Wisconsin, United States, an unincorporated community
- Rube, a cherry cultivar - see Regina cherry

== See also ==
- Hey Rube (disambiguation)
