= Tieton cherry =

Edible fruit cultivar

- Genus: Prunus
- Species: Prunus avium
- Hybrid parentage: Stella × Early Burlat
- Cultivar: Tieton
- Origin: Prosser, WA

Tieton is a cultivar of sweet cherry developed in Washington state.

== Cultivar history ==
The Tieton cultivar is a hybrid of Stella and Early Burlat, originally developed at Washington State University's Irrigated Agriculture Research and Extension Center (IAREC).

== Tree characteristics ==
The Tieton tree is vigorous, but not highly productive. It has similar branching angles to Bing trees. It is recommended to use dwarf rootstocks in order to reduce the tree's vigor and increase its productivity. It is considered a mid-season bloomer (about 0-2 days before Bing). It is not self-fertile, and is incompatible with Burlat and Chelan but compatible with Bing.

== Fruit characteristics ==
Tieton is an early-ripening cherry, about 6-9 days before Bing. The cherries are mahogany-red, very large in size, with very firm texture and mild flavor. They have very thick stems, which allow the fruit to retain moisture, and therefore a fresh appearance, longer after picking. Tieton is susceptible to cracking, doubling, and powdery mildew.
