= Regina cherry =

Cherry cultivar

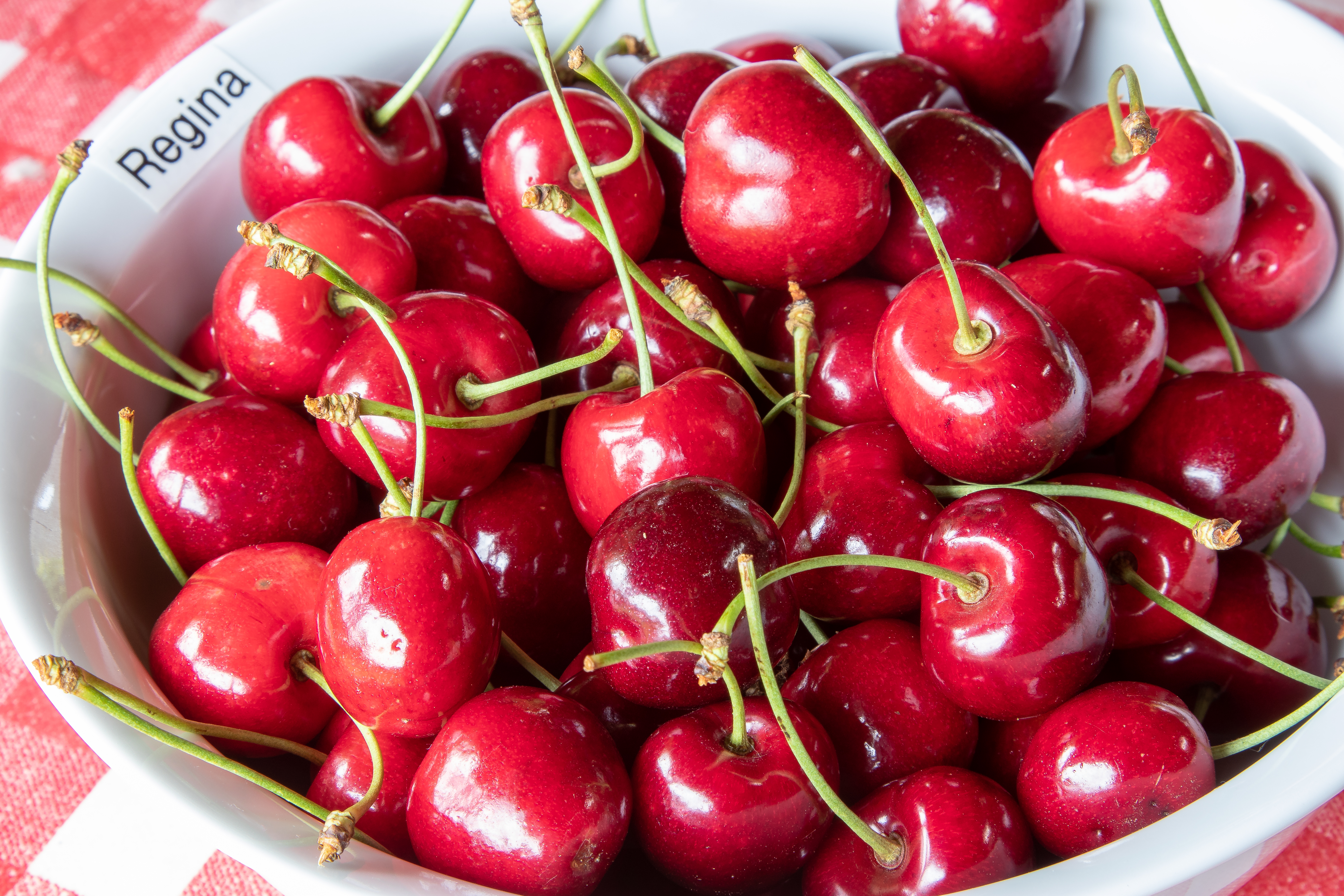
- Genus: Prunus
- Species: Prunus avium
- Hybrid parentage: Schneiders Spate Knorpelkirsche × Rube
- Cultivar: Regina
- Origin: Jork, Germany

Regina is a cultivar of sweet cherry developed in Germany.

== Cultivar history ==
The Regina was developed at the Jork Fruit Research Station in Germany, and is considered the most successful sweet cherry cultivar to have been developed there. First introduced in 1998, Regina is a cross of the 'Schneiders Spate Knorpelkirsche' and 'Rube' cultivars. Apart from Europe, it is also grown commercially in Oregon

== Tree characteristics ==
The Regina tree is compact and upright, with dark green, toothed leaves. It is not self-fertile, and is incompatible with the Van or Olympus cultivars.

== Fruit characteristics ==
Regina is considered a late-season cherry, similar to the Lapins cherry, maturing about 10 days after Bing. The cherries are large, with dark red skin and flesh, and have a sweet-tart flavor. They are highly resistant to rain-cracking.
