= Waverley Country Club =

Country club in Clackamas County, Oregon, United States

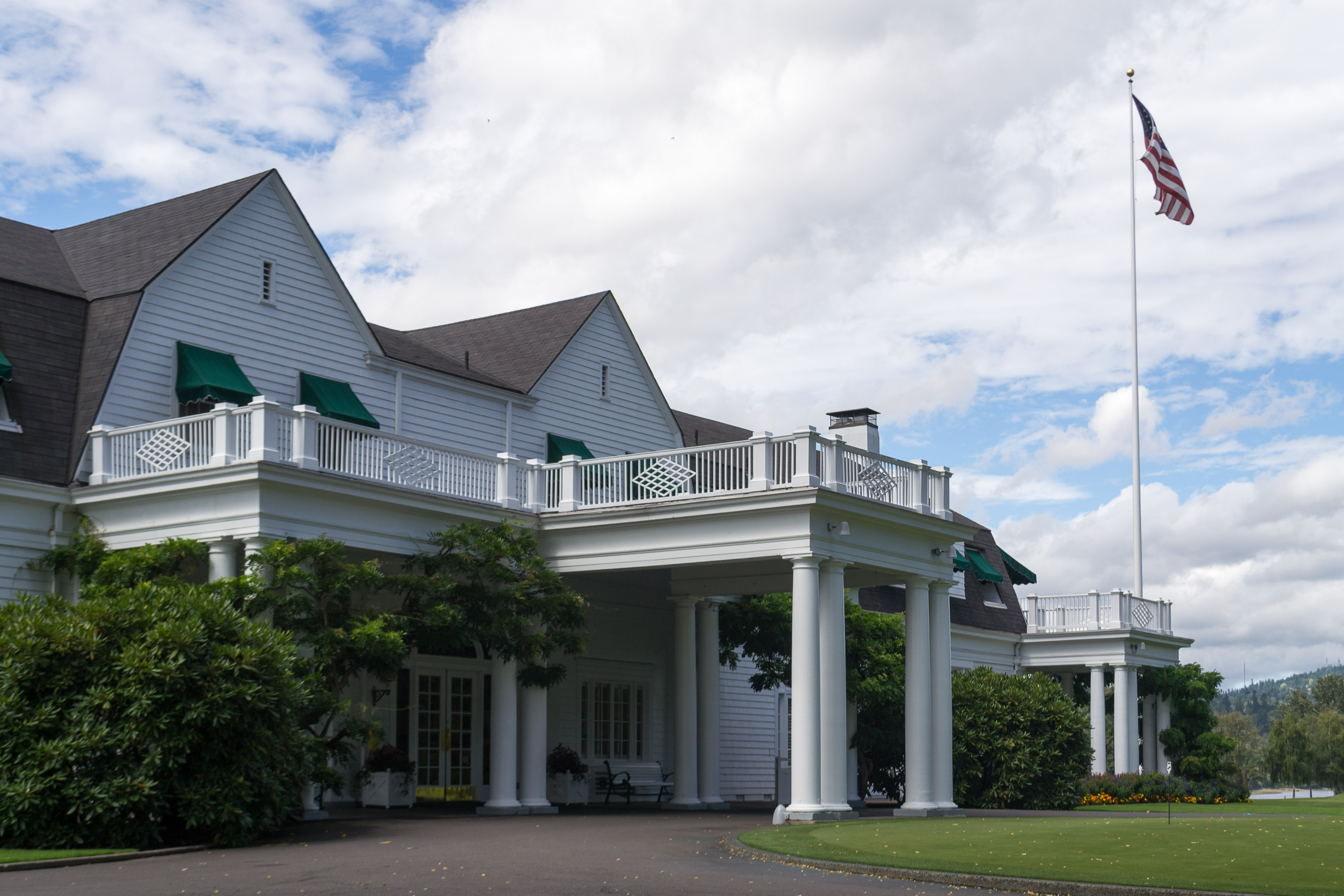
- Interactive map of Waverley Country Club
- 45°27′8.51″N 122°39′12.49″W

Club information
- Location: Clackamas County, Oregon, U.S.
- Established: 1896
- Type: Private
- Tota holes: 18
- Website: www.waverley.cc
- Designed by: Jack Moffat
- Par: 71
- Length: 6,668 yards
- Course rating: 72.0
- Slope rating: 134.0

The Waverley Country Club is a country club located in Clackamas County, Oregon, United States. Chartered in 1896, the club was the second private golf club established west of the Mississippi River.

== History ==
The club was established in April 1896, with its original golf course laid out several miles northeast, in the Richmond neighborhood, near the present-day corner of Southeast César E. Chávez Boulevard and Powell Boulevard. Established two years after the Tacoma Country and Golf Club, Waverley was the second private golf club in the United States established west of the Mississippi River.

A year later, in 1897, the club moved to its present location on the east bank of the Willamette River in unincorporated Clackamas County just south of the Sellwood neighborhood of Portland. It was built on the site of an orchard owned by Oregon pioneers Henderson Luelling and Seth Lewelling, where Seth and his orchard foreman Ah Bing developed the Bing cherry. A golf course was built at the current location in 1898. Jack Moffat, Waverley's first golf professional assisted members in routing the new course. Between May 1912 and 1924, H. Chandler Egan assisted members in establishing the current course routing, completed comprehensive bunkering and constructed numerous green complexes. Until his death in 1936, Egan continued to guide all golf course improvements. Over the past century many of Egan's classical design elements had been overgrown, or had disappeared. In 2012, Gil Hanse using old photographs, was critical in recognizing the masterpiece of classic golf design Egan had imprinted upon Waverley. Today Egan's vision can be seen in the expert restoration of numerous classic architectural elements at Waverley Country Club.

The club, which was originally spelled Waverly after the Waverly-Richmond district in which it was first established, changed its name to Waverley in 1912, with some accounts blaming an engraving error for the change in spelling.

== Course ==
Waverley Country Club
Tee	Rating/Slope	1	2	3	4	5	6	7	8	9	Out	10	11	12	13	14	15	16	17	18	In	Total
Par		4	4	4	4	4	3	4	5	3	35	4	3	4	5	3	4	3	5	5	36	71
SI		13	9	11	3	1	15	5	7	17		1	6	12	2	16	18	14	10	4
Black	72.0/134	333	422	362	438	463	177	385	603	130	3313	411	169	413	512	153	365	224	532	576	3355	6668
Par		4	4	4	4	5	3	4	5	3	36	4	3	4	5	3	4	3	5	5	36	72
SI		11	7	9	1	15	13	3	5	17		4	10	2	16	18	12	8	14	6
Blue	70.7/129	326	360	341	399	453	159	371	565	121	3095	405	146	404	496	126	354	201	507	562	3201	6296
White	68.4/128	314	342	325	393	409	136	362	536	113	2930	373	134	370	489	115	340	186	431	497	2935	5865
SI		13	7	9	5	11	15	3	1	17		12	14	4	2	18	8	16	10	6
Green	66.9/125	314	304	325	344	409	136	309	463	113	2717	373	134	309	489	115	295	155	431	497	2798	5515

== Tournaments hosted ==
The Blyth Tournament, one of the oldest international golf matches in the United States, has been held at Waverley since 1897. The first Oregon Amateur Golf Tournament was held at Waverley in 1904.

Winners of major championship tournaments held at Waverley:

Year	Tournament	Winner
1952	U.S. Women's Amateur	Jackie Pung
1964	U.S. Senior Amateur	William D. Higgins
1970	U.S. Amateur	Lanny Wadkins
1981	U.S. Women's Amateur	Juli Inkster
1993	U.S. Junior Amateur	Tiger Woods
2000	U.S. Women's Amateur	Marcy Newton
2017	U.S. Senior Women's Amateur	Judith Kyrinis
2023	U.S. Senior Women's Open	Trish Johnson
