= Henderson Lewelling House =

Historic house in Iowa, United States

- U.S. National Register of Historic Places
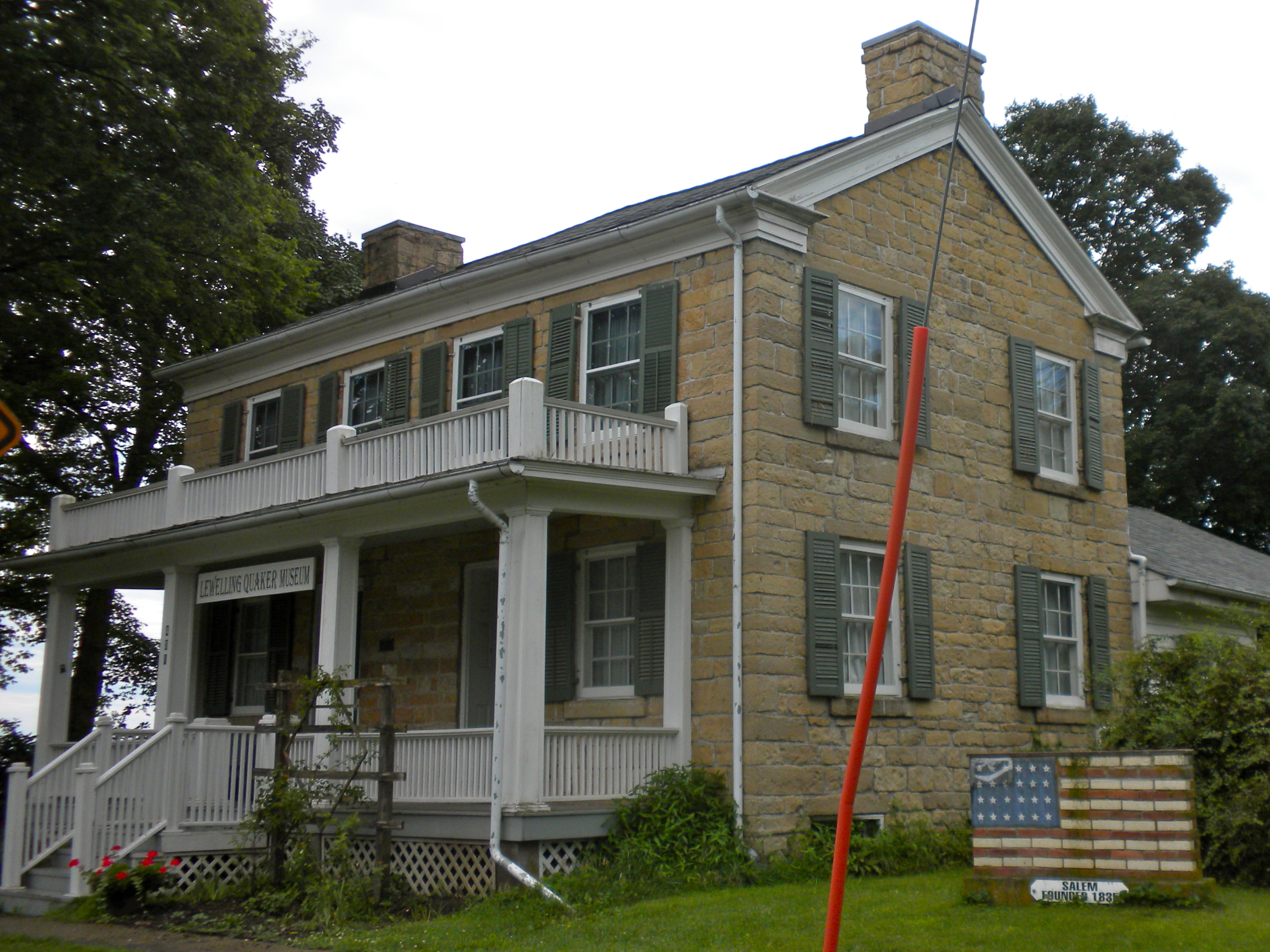

- Location within Iowa Location within the United States
- Location: W. Main St. Salem, Iowa
- Coordinates: 40°51′5.4″N 91°37′17.7″W
- Area: 1.61 acres (0.65 ha)
- Built: 1843
- Built by: Henderson Lewelling
- Architectural style: Greek Revival
- NRHP reference No.: 82002620
- Added to NRHP: June 21, 1982

The Henderson Lewelling House, also known as the Lewelling Quaker Museum, is a historic building located in Salem, Iowa, United States. Henderson Luelling (as he more consistently spelled his surname, following his father's practice) and his wife Elizabeth were among the first settlers in the Quaker community of Salem in 1837. They moved here from Henry County, Indiana, and Henderson moved his fruit tree nursery with him. This was Iowa's first commercial nursery. Henderson built this two-story stone house with Greek Revival details in 1843. The Lewellings were abolitionists associated with the Society of Anti-Slavery Friends, and his home is thought to have been a stop on the Underground Railroad. The family left Salem for Oregon in 1847, taking the nursery with them.

The Lewelling's continued to own the house after they left Salem, and Nelson Gibbs, the local Justice of the Peace, used it for his office. In 1848 he held a hearing in the house concerning the slaves of Ruel Daggs from Clark County, Missouri who had escaped to Salem. Because of the size of the crowd, the hearing was moved to the Anti-Slavery Quaker Meetinghouse (no longer extant) across the street. Gibbs determined he had no jurisdiction in the case. It led to the federal court case Ruel Daggs vs. Elihu Frazier et al (1850), which was heard in the United States District Court for the Southern District of Iowa in Burlington. The case, which Daggs won, was one of the last major cases using the Fugitive Slave Act of 1793, and the only one held west of the Mississippi River.

The house was listed on the National Register of Historic Places in 1982. It is noteworthy for its association with both Lewelling's nursery and the Daggs' case. It has been converted into a museum.

== See also ==
- Royal Ann cherry
- Seth Lewelling
