= Chinook =

Chinook may refer to:

== Chinook peoples ==
The name derives from a settlement of Indigenous people in Oregon and Washington State.

- Chinookan peoples, several groups of Indigenous people of the Pacific Northwest
  - Chinook Indian Nation, an organization representing the western tribes of Chinookan peoples
- Chinookan languages, small family of languages spoken in Oregon and Washington along the Columbia River by Chinook peoples
  - Chinook Jargon, a language originating as a pidgin trade language in the Pacific Northwest
  - Lower Chinook, a Chinookan language spoken at the mouth of the Columbia River
  - Upper Chinook language, a recently extinct language of the US Pacific Northwest

== Places ==
- Chinook, a Martian crater at 22.7°N 55.5°W
- Chinook (provincial electoral district), a provincial electoral district in Alberta
- Chinook, Alberta, a hamlet in Canada
- Peregrino (previously Chinook), an oil field located offshore of Brazil, east of Rio de Janeiro

=== United States ===
- Chinook, Montana, a city in and the county seat of Blaine County

==== Washington state ====
- Chinook Pass, through the Cascade Range
- Chinook Peak, a summit located on the eastern border of Mount Rainier National Park
- Chinook, Washington, a census-designated place (CDP) in Pacific County
- Washington State Route 410 (also the Chinook Scenic Byway), a 107.44-mile long state highway

== Animals ==
- Chinook (dog), a breed of sled dog
- Chinook salmon, the largest and most valuable species of Pacific salmon

== Plants ==
- Chinook cherry, a cross between Bing and Gil Peck cultivars

== Transport ==
- Avro Canada Chinook, Canada's first turbojet engine
- Chinook station, a CTrain light rail station in Manchester, Calgary, Alberta

=== Aircraft ===
- Birdman Chinook, a family of single and two-place, pusher configuration, high-wing ultralight aircraft
- Boeing CH-47 Chinook, a tandem-rotor helicopter
- Hermanspann Chinook, an American mid-wing, two-seat, experimental research glider
- Meadowcroft Chinook, a two-seat mid-winged American homebuilt aircraft
- Wings of Change Chinhook Bi, an Austrian two-place paraglider

=== Watercraft ===
- USS Chinook (PC-9), the ninth Cyclone-class patrol ship of the United States Navy
- USS Chinook (SP-644), a United States Navy patrol vessel
- MV Golden Gate (previously Chinook), a passenger-only fast ferry

== Other ==
- Chinook, the first Canadian exclusive geographic Beanie Baby
- The Chinook, weekly newspaper in South Vancouver founded by George Matheson Murray
- Chinook (computer program), draughts player
- Chinook (newspaper), a counterculture underground newspaper published weekly in Denver, Colorado
- Chinook Sciences, a technology company that specializes in waste to energy and metal recovery
- Chinook wind, two types of prevailing warm, generally westerly winds in western North America
- Chinook Wines, a Washington winery located in the Yakima Valley AVA
- Billy Chinook (c. 1827 – 1890), chief and member of the Wasco tribe
- Lakeshore Chinooks, a baseball team based in Mequon, Wisconsin
- Chugiak-Eagle River Chinooks, a baseball team based in Chugiak, Alaska

== See also ==
- Chinook Centre, the largest shopping mall in Calgary, Alberta, Canada
- Chinook Park, Calgary, a residential neighbourhood
- Chrysotoxum chinook, a species of syrphid fly
