= Sweetheart cherry =

Cherry cultivar developed in Canada

- Genus: Prunus
- Species: Prunus avium
- Hybrid parentage: Van × Newstar
- Cultivar: Sweetheart
- Breeder: David Lane
- Origin: Summerland, British Columbia, Canada

The Sweetheart cherry is a cultivar of cherry. It is a hybrid of the Van and Newstar cultivars first developed in Canada.

== Cultivar history ==
The Sweetheart cultivar was developed at the Pacific Agri-Food Research Centre in Summerland, British Columbia. The cross was made in 1975 and selected in 1982, and the variety was officially released in 1994. It has since been used as a parent cultivar for several new varieties, including Staccato, Sentennial, and Sovereign. The American Society for Horticultural Science awarded Sweetheart their Outstanding Fruit Cultivar award in 2012.

== Tree characteristics ==
Sweetheart is a self-fertile cultivar which can be used as a "universal pollinator" for other cherry varieties with similar bloom time. The flowers bloom about 2-3 days before Bing. It is a very heavy producer, with overcropping being a potential issue. The tree is highly susceptible to powdery mildew.

== Fruit characteristics ==
Sweetheart is a late-season cherry, ripening about 20-22 days after Bing cherries. The fruit is of moderate size, with red flesh, and dark bright red skin.
