= Joseph Hamilton Lambert =

American pioneer and orchardist

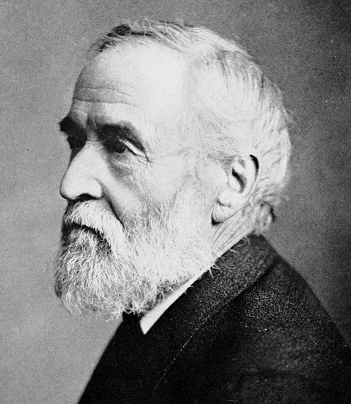
- Lambert in his later years
- Born: December 1, 1825; Vigo County, Indiana
- Died: November 12, 1909 (aged 83); Portland, Oregon
- Known for: Lambert cherry
- Spouse: Clementine Miller
- Children: Albert W., Henry M., Carrie (Mrs. E. L. E. White), Mary (Mrs. A. B. Graham), Nellie, Elizabeth (Mrs. W. L. Wood), Lucy (Mrs. D. G. Woodard), and Grace

Joseph Hamilton Lambert (December 1, 1825 – November 12, 1909), was an American pioneer of Oregon and an orchardist who developed the Lambert cherry. A native of Indiana, he also served as a county commissioner in Multnomah and Clackamas counties in Oregon.

== Early life ==
Lambert was born on December 1, 1825, in Vigo County, Indiana, a few miles northeast of Terre Haute. He was raised on a farm by his parents, Hugh and Nancy (née McClain) Lambert. At the age of 20, Lambert left Indiana for Iowa, where he worked and went to school until 1849, when he headed west again. He traveled on the Oregon Trail, arriving at the Philip Foster Farm at the end of the Barlow Road in Oregon Country on September 14, 1850. He spent the winter in Salem. In the spring of 1851, he traveled to Yreka, California, for the California Gold Rush, but he soon returned to Oregon's Willamette Valley, where he worked in a sawmill and for William Meek & Henderson Luelling in Milwaukie hauling logs. Next he joined the surveying team of a Mr. Ives. He helped lay out the Willamette Meridian north from Portland to Puget Sound, and the Willamette Baseline, the first standard parallel in Oregon. He also surveyed a few tiers of townships, including Salem. He returned to working in sawmills and as a log hauler until 1853, when he was again employed by Meek & Luelling, this time in their orchard business. In 1854, Lambert married Clementine Miller and they took up a 320-acre (1.3 km^{2}) Donation Land Claim in Powell Valley.

== Orchardist ==
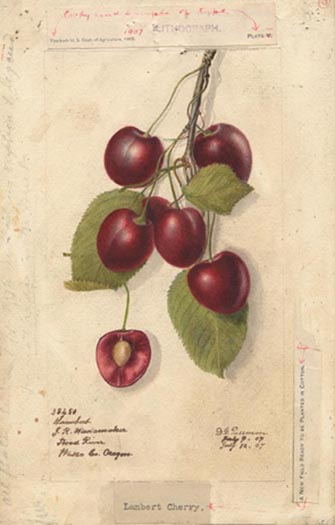
Lambert cherries, from the USDA Pomological Watercolor Collection

Henderson's brother Seth Lewelling later bought out Henderson's share of the business. In 1859, Lambert and his father-in-law, Henry Miller, bought half of Meek's interest in Meek & Luelling's orchard. The venture did not start out well, because of a drop in the price of apples and the poor yield from the formerly productive trees. Lambert introduced new horticulture methods that in two years restored the health of the trees and again allowed them to produce "mammoth" crops of apples. Lambert became the sole owner of the orchards, which are notable for being the first to produce cultivated fruit in Oregon. Former owner Henderson Luelling later became a prominent orchardist in California.

=== Lambert cherry ===
Lambert developed what became known as the Lambert cherry, by grafting a volunteer seedling, found in 1848 under a Napoleon cherry tree to the rootstock of a May Duke cherry. The crown of the tree died in 1880 and a new tree grew from its roots that was not a May Duke, nor was it identical to the original seedling. The resulting cherry was large, richly colored, flavorful, and had a small pit, and it immediately became popular. Lambert introduced his cherry to the Oregon Horticultural Society in 1896 and it became one of the most important cherries grown in the early Oregon orchards, along with Royal Anns, Bings, and Black Republicans. In 1916, it was called the "finest cherry grown in America".

== Other work ==
While living in Multnomah County in 1858, Lambert was elected to serve on the county commission. He served as a Clackamas County Commissioner in 1864.

In 1887, Lambert was a founding member of the Oregon Horticultural Society. In 1890, he helped establish the Citizens Bank of Portland and became its president. Lambert managed to keep the bank open during the financial Panic of 1893, when over 500 banks failed. He also served as president of White Publishing Company.

== Death and legacy ==
Joseph and Clementine Lambert had ten children, eight of whom survived into adulthood. Their two sons and six daughters included author Elizabeth Lambert Wood. Clementine died in the early 1890s, and Joseph Lambert died in Portland, Oregon, on November 12, 1909, at the age of 83.

J. H. Lambert is one of the 158 names of people who are notable in the early history of Oregon painted in the friezes of the House and Senate chambers of the Oregon State Capitol. Lambert's name is in the House chamber. His former employer Seth Lewelling (formerly Luelling), developer of the Bing cherry, is so honored on the Senate side.
