= Rainier cherry =

Edible fruit cultivar

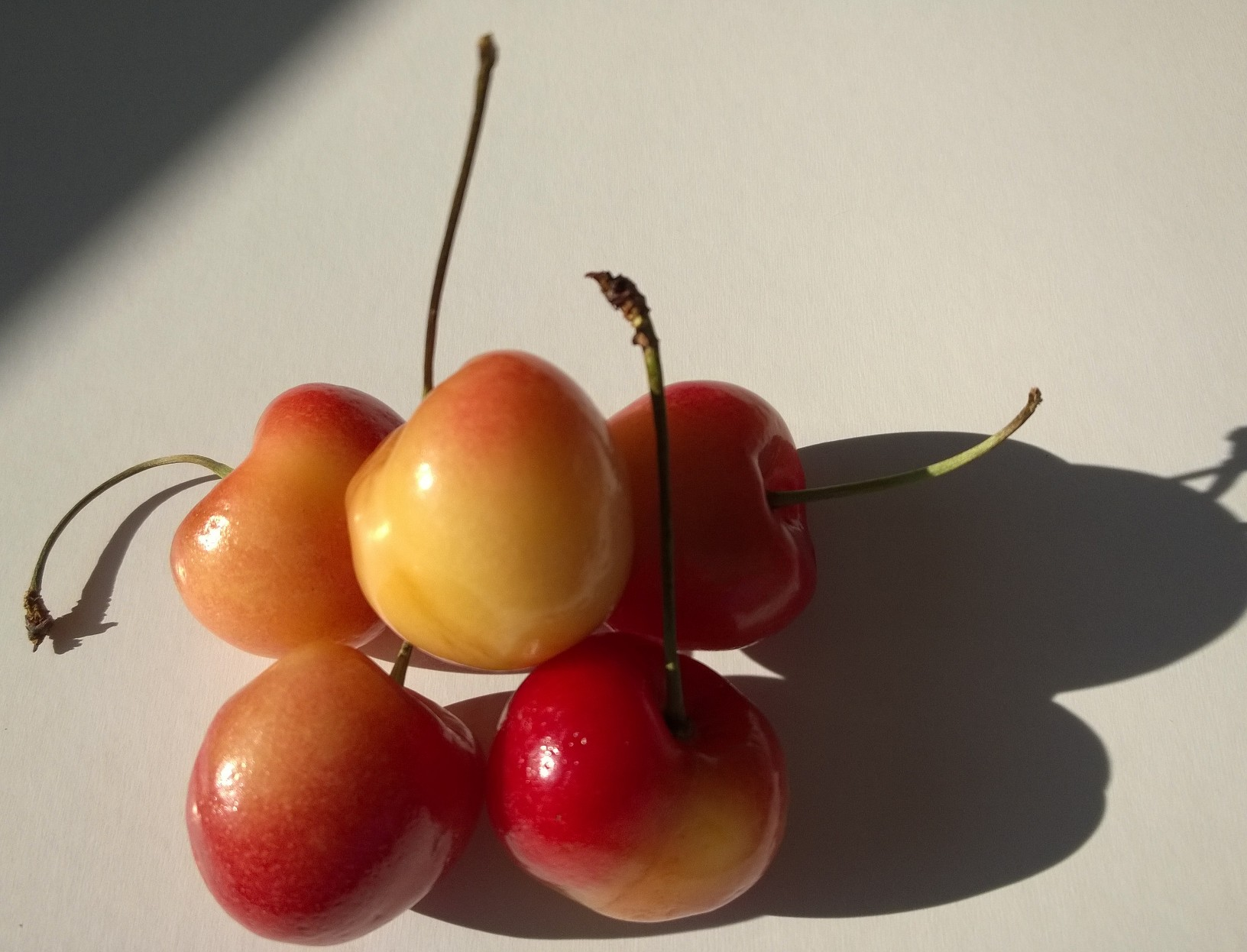
- Rainier cherries from the state of Washington, USA
- Genus: Prunus
- Species: Prunus avium
- Cultivar: 'Rainier'
- Breeder: Harold Fogle
- Origin: Washington State University, in 1952

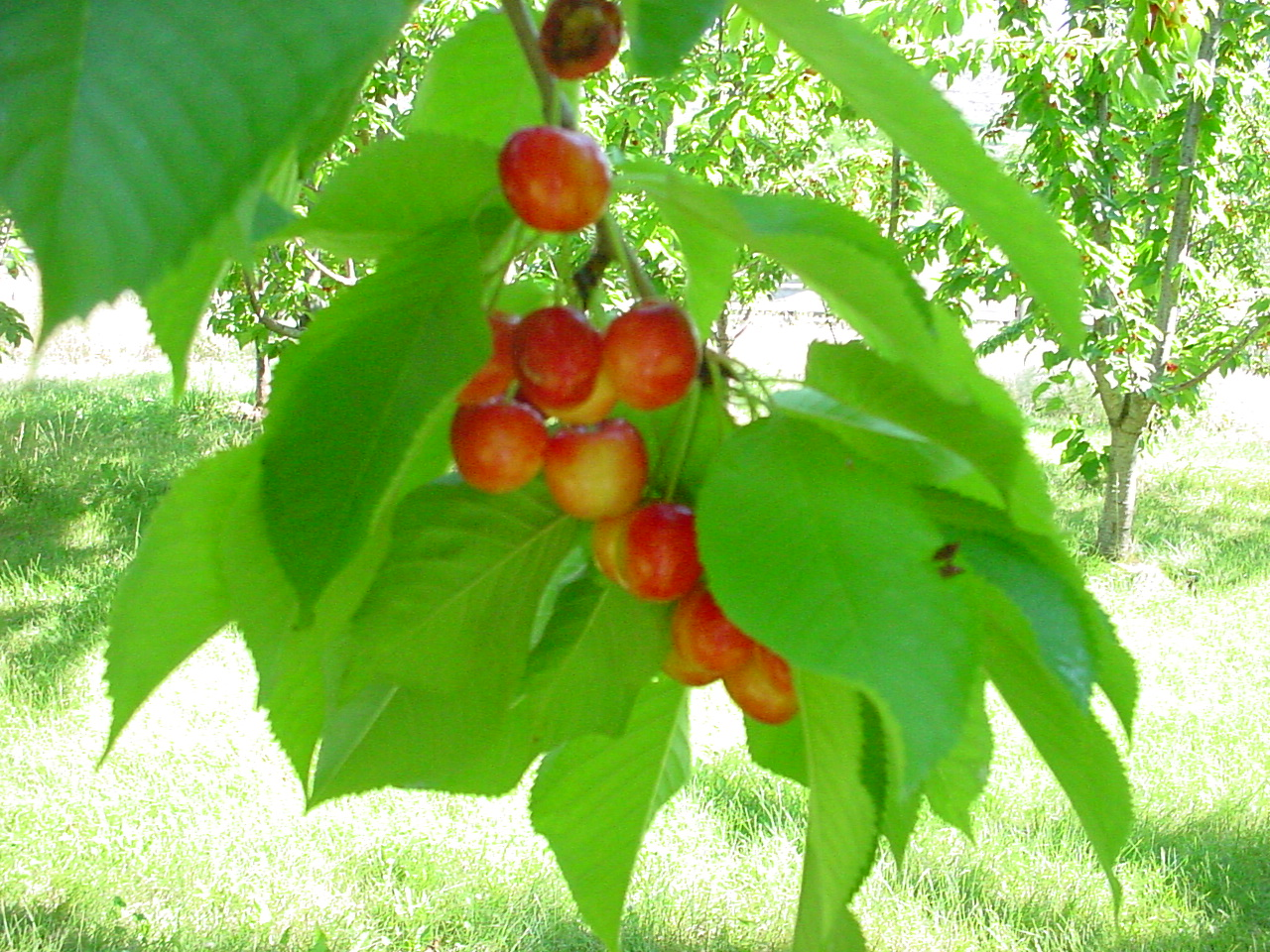
Branch of a Rainier cherry tree

Rainier Cherries at a market

Rainier (/reɪˈnɪər/ ray-NEER) is a cultivar of cherry. It was developed in 1952 at Washington State University by Harold Fogle, and named after Mount Rainier. It is a cross between the Bing and Van cultivars.

Rainiers are considered a premium type of cherry. They are sweet with a thin skin and thick creamy-yellow flesh. The cherries are susceptible to temperature, wind, and rain, and the flesh is generally more watery than other sweet cherries.

Rainiers are grown mainly in the Northwestern United States region, in the states of Oregon, Washington, Idaho, Montana, Utah, and Wyoming, although some production also occurs in the southern parts of British Columbia in Canada. Washington state is the top producer.

== Plant facts ==
The standard rootstock for the Rainier cherry is the Mazzard cherry, a wild or seedling sweet cherry used as grafting stock. Mature Rainier trees reach a height of 30 to 35 feet and are widely adaptable to various soil types. Trees should be well spaced to provide maximum sun exposure for individual branches, ensuring fully developed, sweet, ripe fruit at harvest time. Rainiers will produce fruit in 3 to 5 years, with a bloom period in early April. The creamy light yellow to medium yellow-orange fruit develops a red blush and is ready to harvest from late June through early July. Rainier cultivars require pollination. Typical pollenizers are the Bing, Van, Lapins, Black Tartarian, and Lambert cultivars. Rainiers grow best in USDA Zones 4–9. It is one of the most cold-hardy sweet cherries.
