= Royal Ann cherry =

Variety of edible fruit

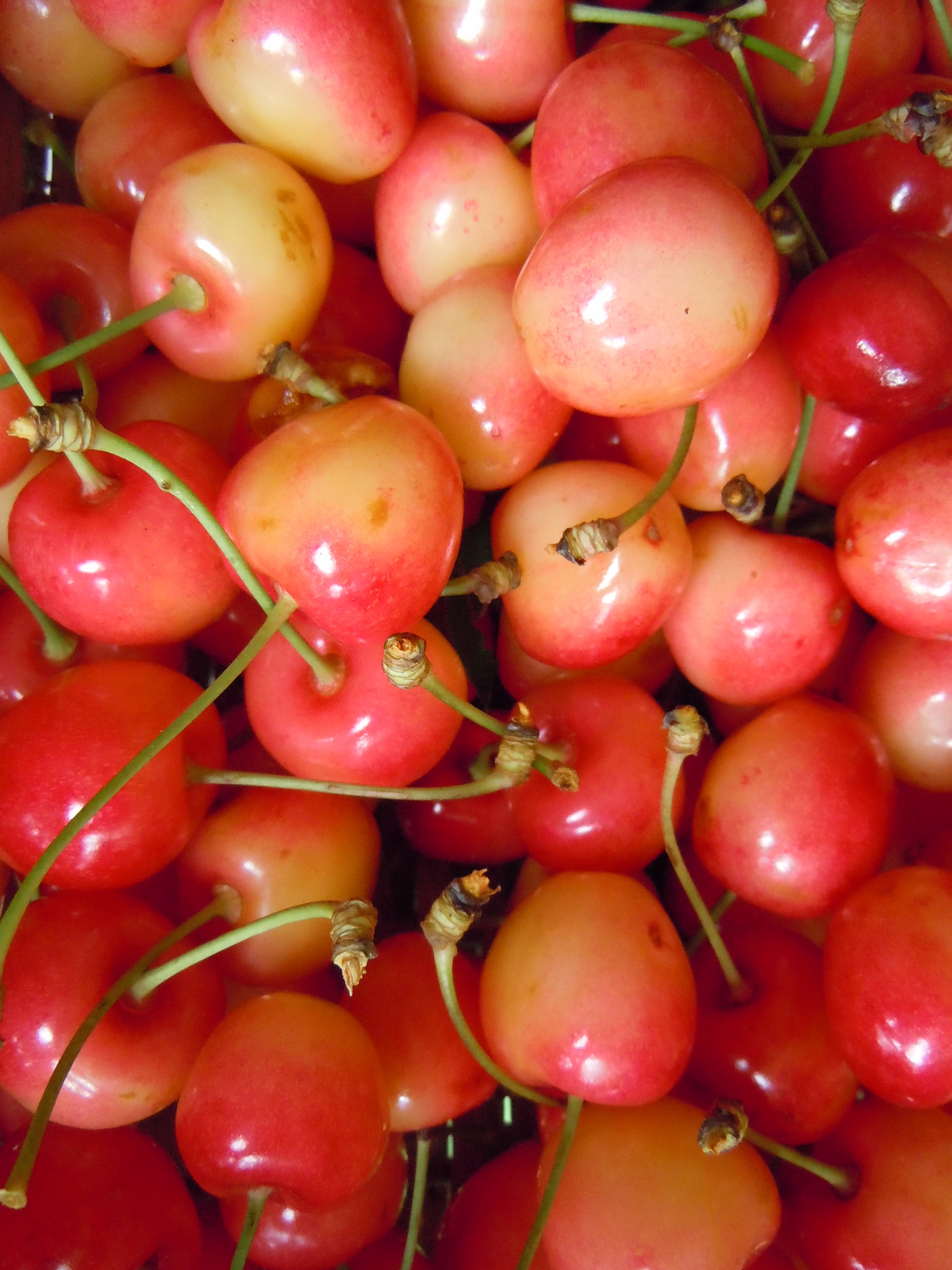
- Genus: Prunus
- Species: Prunus avium
- Cultivar: 'Royal Ann'

The Royal Ann or Royal Anne is a variety of cherry, similar in appearance and taste to the Rainier cherry. It belongs to the firm-fleshed sweet cherries, also known by the French name bigarreaux. Its fruits are large and will not get mushy quickly during cooking, making it a prime variety for conserves and pickling. While it is also excellent to eat fresh, its fruit are yellow-skinned and -fleshed, with a red hue only present wherever the skin was directly exposed to the sun. Unless they are grown on small trees in full sunlight, they easily become visibly bruised and less appetizing during handling, and are thus rarely available in markets.

This cherry variety originates in Europe north of the Alps, spreading widely across that continent and to the British Isles due to its firm and (at that time) huge fruit at the start of the 19th century. At that time, Napoleon Bonaparte was at the height of his power; hence, this cherry is also called Napoleon cherry, bigarreau Napoleon or similar in many European languages. Other common names refer to royalty: Queen Anne (hence "Royal Ann", by which name it spread across North America), Große Prinzessin/Grote Prinses, Kaiser Franz/Emperor Francis, Königskirsche, or the more generic Wienerin/Dunajka, Lauermanns Kirsche and Herites.

== Biology ==
=== About Royal Ann ===
Royal Ann cherry trees are perennial semi-dwarfs that bloom early April with harvest in mid-summer. They are deciduous trees that can be characterized by dark green leaves and clusters of small fragrant white flowers that are about 2.5-3 centimeters wide. Royal Ann flowers are hermaphroditic, containing both male and female reproductive organs, however, the tree cannot self-pollinate. Another pollinator species is necessary for fertilization to occur, most commonly bees. Each flower goes on to produce a single Royal Ann cherry. A mature fruit producing Royal Ann tree is about 12–15 feet in height. The trees prefer a half to full day of sun, and soil with good drainage. Royal Ann trees require a temperate climate, where the average winter temperature does not drop below 10 degrees Fahrenheit.

Royal Ann cherries are fleshy stone fruits similar in size to most cherry varieties, and are yellow to light pink colored. Royal Ann fruits are often mistaken for Rainier cherries because of their similar appearance and taste. Trees produce fruit within 1–3 years after planting and are considered fully mature around 8 years old. Royal Ann trees can produce up to 50 pounds of cherries per season.

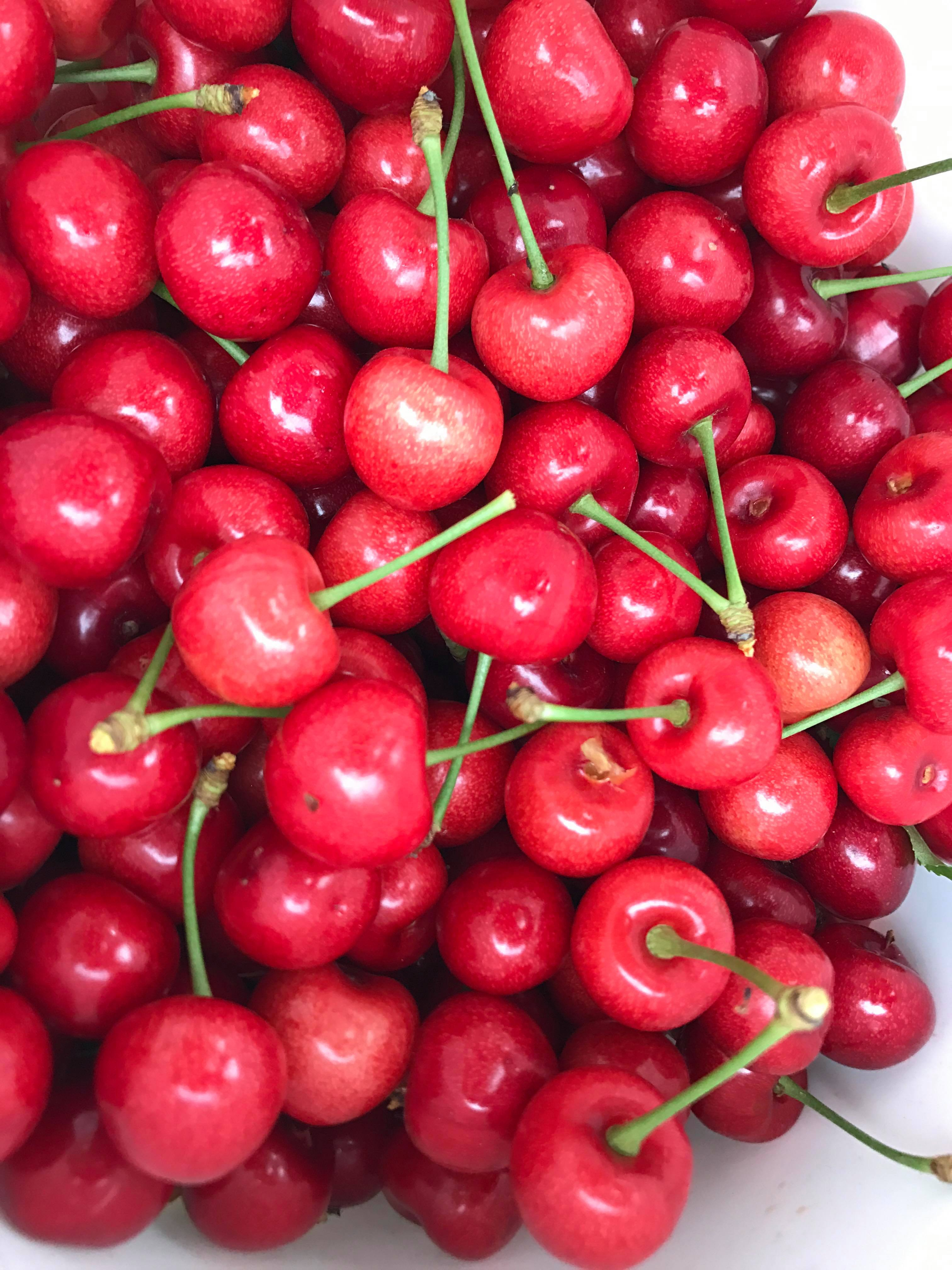
Royal Ann cherries harvested from a Southwest Michigan farm

==== Nutrient content ====
Cherries are famous for containing high levels of antioxidants, which are substances that inhibit oxidation in living organisms. Sweet cherries, like the Royal Ann are also high in sugars, like glucose, fructose, sucrose, and sorbitol. Organic acids in sweet cherries include malic, citric, shikimic, and fumaric.

Stone fruits are known to contain toxic compounds that produce hydrogen cyanide, which is toxic or lethal in large doses. These compounds can be found in the bark, flowers, seeds, and leaves of cherry trees. Children have been poisoned in the past by eating or swallowing large amounts of seeds. Livestock have been killed by grazing on branches and leaves.

== Domestication ==
It is thought that cherries first originated in Turkey, near the Black Sea. Cultivation has been credited to the Greeks who helped the fruit spread through the Roman Empire and to England, where cherry trees were used as a food source and also for timber.

Sweet cherry trees were initially taken to the United States with the colonists in 1629. In 1847, Henderson Lewelling took 700 fruit trees of Napoleon Bigarreau from Iowa to Oregon's Willamette Valley to start a cherry orchard. Seth Lewelling joined his brother Henderson in 1850, he renamed the tree 'Royal Ann'. Seth later developed the Bing cherry.

== Cultivation ==
Sweet cherry trees are labeled as being very delicate and finicky. They are not a popular choice for growing with hobby gardeners because they can be very time-consuming. Tips for facilitating growth and harvesting include bending the branches.

Sweet cherry trees grow vertically very quickly, as more nutrients from sunlight means a higher yield of fruits. However, the more vertical the tree is, the more foliage there is on the tree rather than fruit. By bending the branches at an angle of 30–60 degrees in relation to the trunk and anchoring them to the ground, the tree will produce more fruit and fewer leaves. Research findings show that bending branches slows the release of hormones coursing through the tree that are essential for fruit growth.

=== Pests, diseases, etc. ===
Birds are the most common pest of cherry trees, seeking the sweet fruits. Birds can be repelled by using netting to cover trees in an orchard or deploying flash tape to scare them away.

Bacterial canker is a disease that can afflict all cherry trees, including Royal Ann trees. Signs of the disease include dead branches and brown colored damaged spots on branches or the trunk. Bacterial canker can be deterred by applying a copper spray to the trees in the fall and winter months.

Another common problem is rain splitting. This happens when the tree takes in an abnormally high amount of water due to heavy rains or overwatering. The skin of the fruit can't grow as fast as the fruit flesh is growing and the skin bursts open.

== Human use ==
Because of their firm and fleshy traits, Royal Ann cherries are ideal for commercial and home canning. They are often used for making pies, sauces, and jams because of their natural sweetness. Because Royal Ann cherries are so fragile, they make a great option for canning because the fruit is not being selected based on appearances as if it were freshly picked. Bruised Royal Ann cherries will taste the same mashed into a pie or in canned preserves.

Royal Ann cherries are also used to make maraschino cherries for cocktails and dishes. Royal Ann cherries are also eaten fresh, and are said to have a distinct sweet taste when consumed in this manner.
