= Chinook cherry =

Cherry cultivar

- Genus: Prunus
- Species: Prunus avium
- Hybrid parentage: 'Bing' and 'Gil Peck'
- Cultivar: 'Chinook'
- Breeder: 1960 by Harold Fogle, with Washington State University

Chinook is a cross between 'Bing' and 'Gil Peck' and was introduced in 1960 by Harold Fogle. 'Chinook' is similar to Bing but is sweeter and ripens 4 to 10 days sooner. 'Chinook' is a cross-pollinizer with 'Bing' and 'Van'.

'Chinook' was introduced as a black-fruited pollinizer for 'Bing' that could be shipped fresh. It has been removed from orchards because of its relatively soft flesh and serious rain cracking.
