= Emperor Francis cherry =

Edible fruit cultivar

'Emperor Francis' cherry
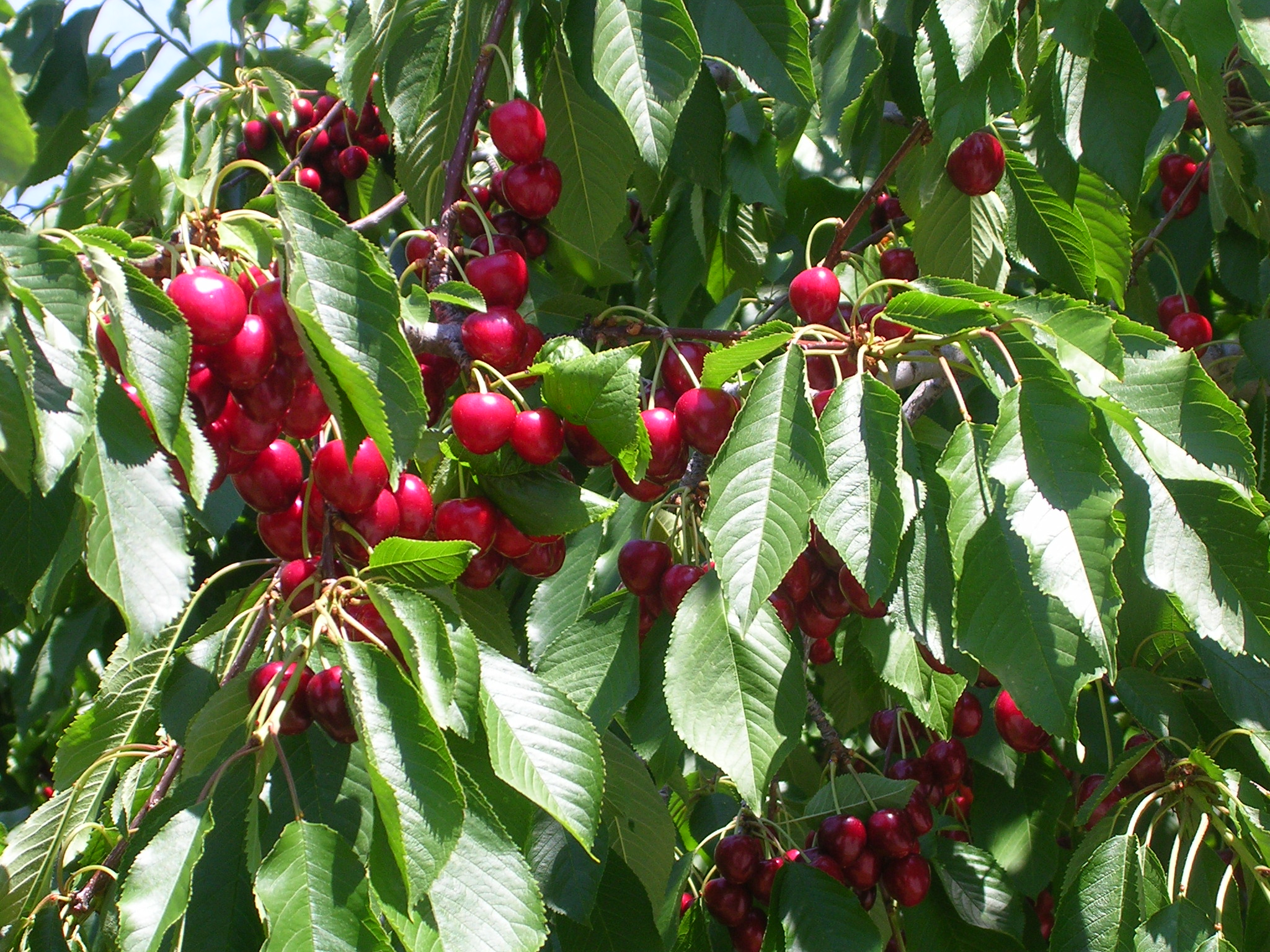
- The 'Emperor Francis' cherry was the source of the first cherry genetic map
- Genus: Prunus
- Species: Prunus avium
- Cultivar: 'Emperor Francis'

The Emperor Francis cherry is a sweet cherry cultivar (Prunus avium) that produces a bright red fruit which is resistant to cracking. In 1996, it was the source of the first cherry genetic map, which was created from a haploid-microspore derived population from the 'Emperor Francis' cultivar. It is also one of the sources of the 'Newfane' sweet cherry, which was created by crossing the 'Emperor Francis' with the 'Stella' cherry. It can be cross-pollinated with 'Montmorency' cherry.
