= Coronation (grape) =

Variety of grape

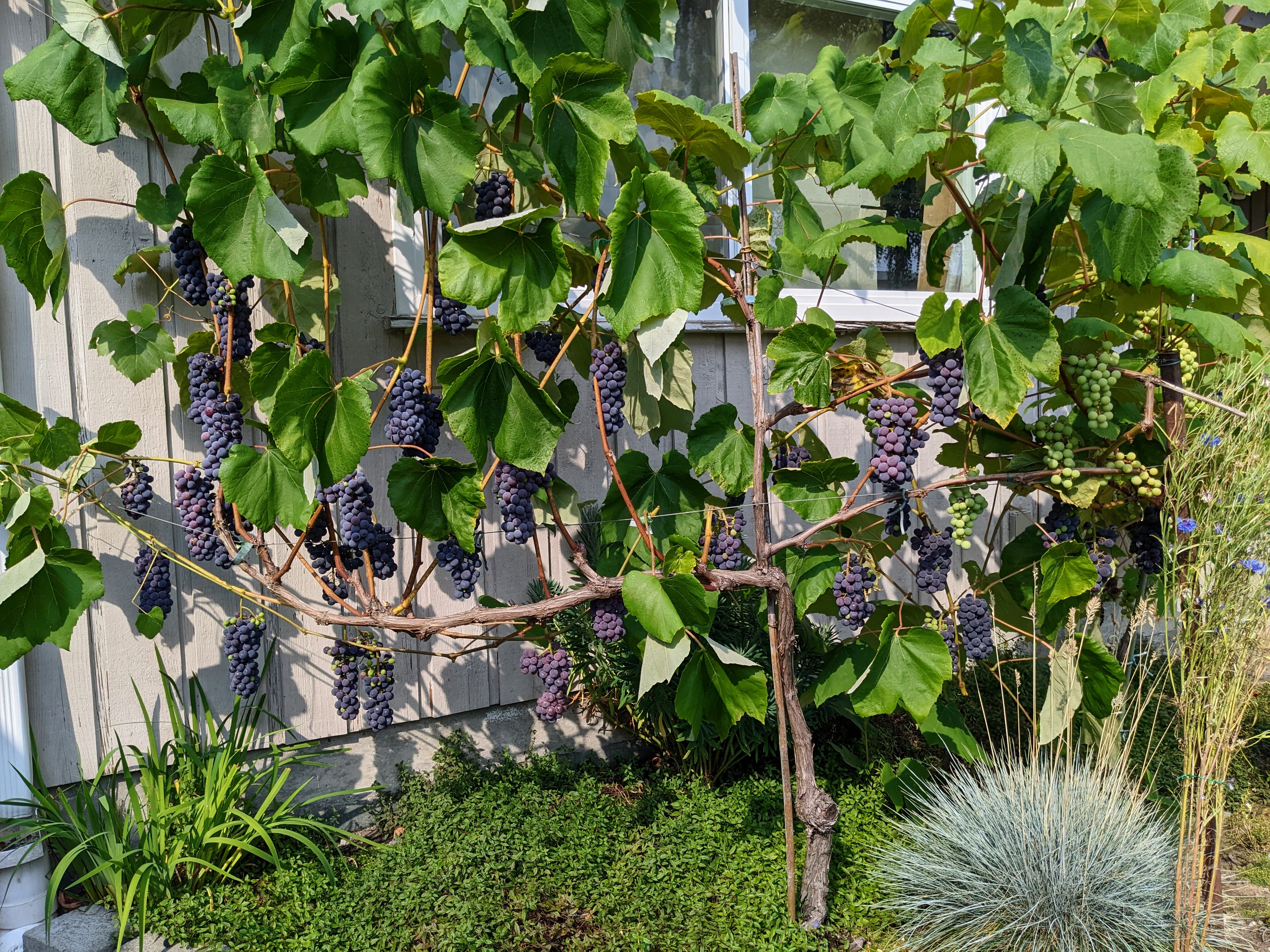
Sovereign Coronation grape vine near Vancouver, Canada.

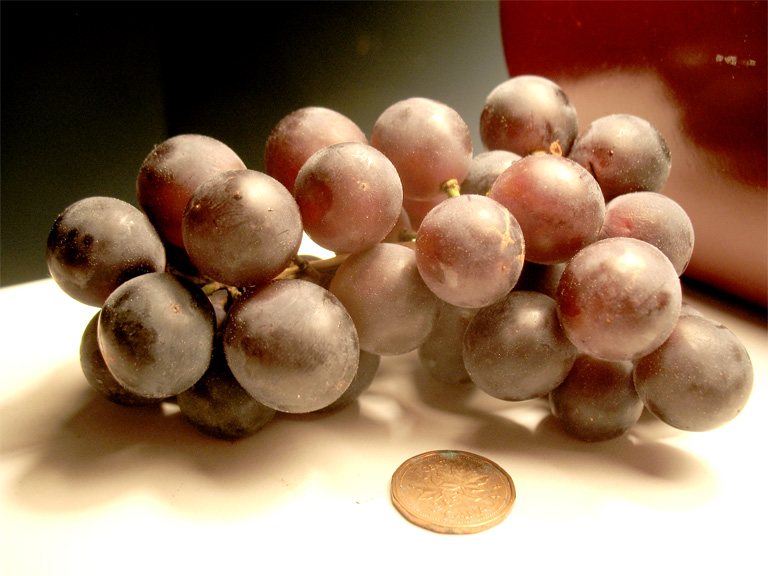
A cluster of Coronation grapes

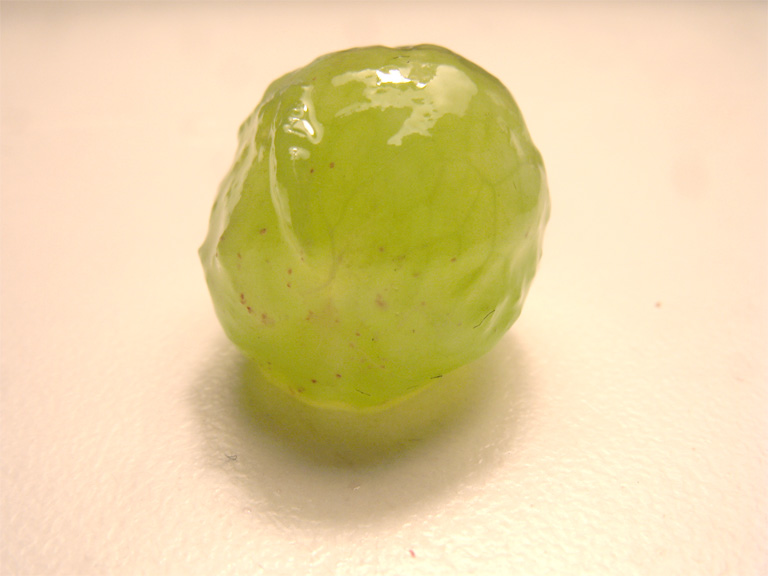
A Coronation grape with the outer skin removed

Coronation grapes (formally, Sovereign Coronation) are a hybrid variety of table grape developed in Canada. Coronation grapes are popular throughout Canada, and are available during a short period in late summer and early fall. These grapes are characterized by their "vibrant blue-purple" colour, similar to the related Concord variety, but are seedless.

== Development ==
Agriculture Canada's Pacific Agri-Food Research Centre in Summerland, British Columbia developed the Sovereign Coronation grape in the 1970s. This project was directed by Lyall Denby, as part of the Plant Breeding Program.

The Coronation grape is a hybrid of two North American varieties: the black Patricia (not to be confused with the white Lady Patricia) and the Himrod.

== Agriculture ==
Coronation grapes are a "fairly hardy variety" of grape and are most productive in relatively cool climates.

The grapes ripen as early as late August, and are consequently available earlier than traditional varieties. Availability ranges from late August to early September in Ontario and early September to early October in British Columbia.

In 2007, an estimated 2.2 million kilograms of Coronation grapes were produced in Ontario. Despite having only been introduced to the Niagara region in 2000, in 2008 they were the most abundantly grown seedless table grape in southern Ontario.

== Use in cuisine ==
Coronation grapes
Nutritional value per 100 g (3.5 oz)
- Energy: 273 kJ (65 kcal)
- Carbohydrates: 17 g
- Sugars: 16 g
- Dietary fibre: 1 g
- Fat: 0 g
- Saturated: 0 g
- Trans: 0 g
- Protein: 1 g
Vitamins and minerals
Minerals	Quantity %DV^{†}
Sodium	0% 2 mg
- Other constituents: Quantity
- Cholesterol: 0 mg
- Source: Ontario Tender Fruit Producers

The flavour of the Coronation grape has been variously described as a "sweet-and-sour taste that bursts in the mouth", "sophisticated [and] deliciously sweet", a "mild sweet taste", "distinctive [and] musky", and "an odd, off taste".

The grapes can be eaten fresh, or incorporated into fruit preserves, sauces and desserts. The raw grapes can be stored in a refrigerator for up to ten days, or frozen without loss of colour or flavour.
