= Chelan cherry =

Cherry cultivar

- Genus: Prunus
- Species: Prunus avium
- Hybrid parentage: Stella × Beaulieu
- Cultivar: Chelan
- Origin: Prosser, WA

The Chelan cherry is a cultivar of cherry. It is a hybrid of the Stella and Beaulieu varieties first developed in Prosser, Washington.

== Cultivar history ==
The Chelan cultivar was developed in Prosser, Washington, by Thomas Toyama and Ed Proebsting, affiliated with the University of Washington. The cross was made in 1971 and selected in 1978.

== Plant facts ==
The Chelan cherry tree grows in USDA Zone 5, and is self-incompatible. It is a vigorous and early-bearing tree; with the fruit ripening about 10-12 days earlier than Bing cherries, it is the earliest of the sweet cherries grown in the Pacific Northwest region of the United States. The fruit exhibits superior cracking resistance, and the trees appear to be resistant to powdery mildew, but many of the trees produced in the 1990s were infected with prune dwarf virus.

== Growing regions ==
Apart from the US Pacific Northwest, Chelan cherries are grown in Canada and Australia.
