= Summerland Research and Development Centre =

Agricultural research centre in British Columbia, Canada

Coordinates: 49.24303°N 121.76429°W

The Pacific Agri-Food Research Centre (previously known as the Dominion Experimental Farm at Summerland and Summerland Research Station) is an agricultural research centre in British Columbia, Canada. The centre has been historically important in the development of tree fruits. It is administered by Agriculture and Agri-Food Canada and includes sites at Summerland and Agassiz.

== History ==
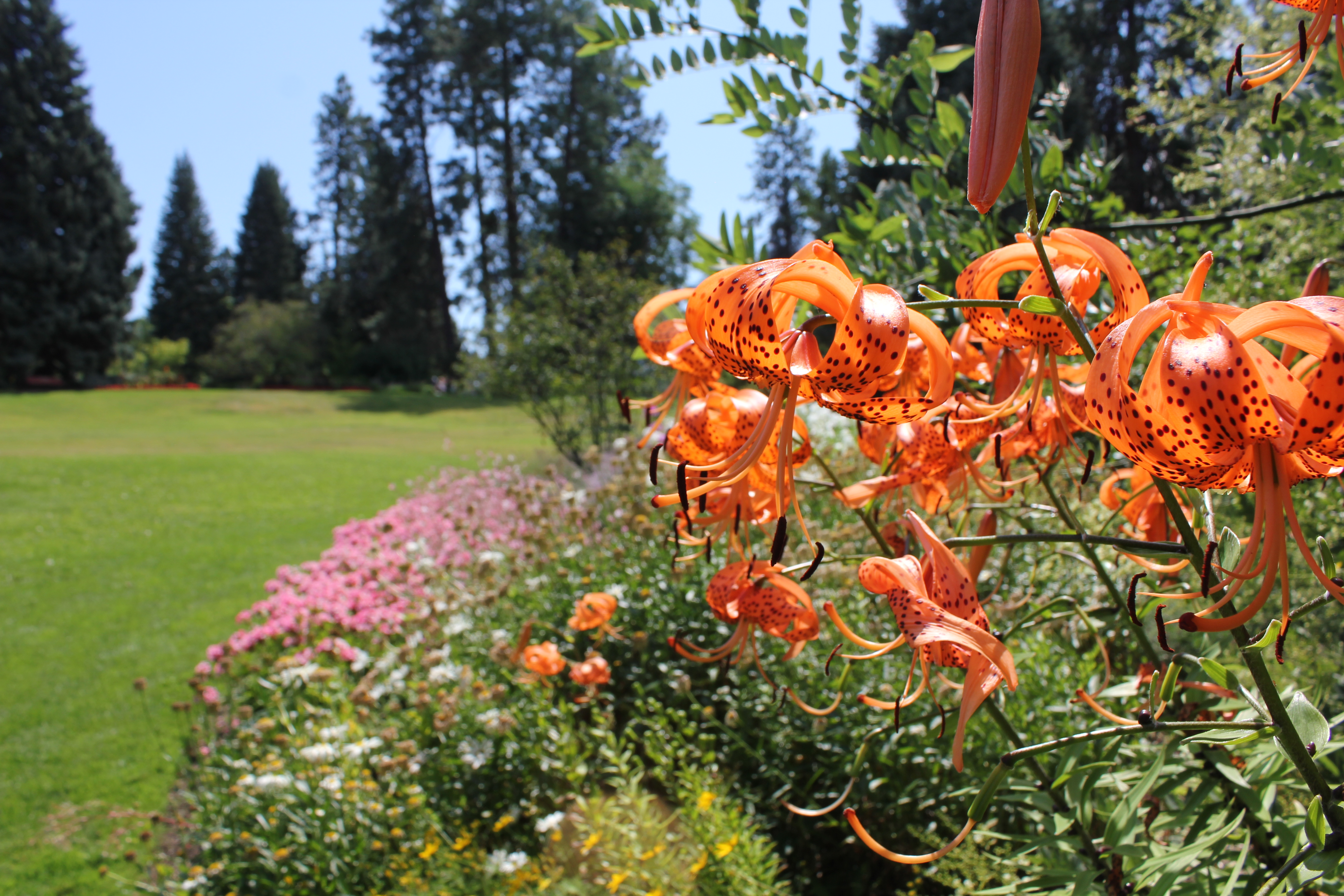
Flowers at the ornamental gardens, once part of the centre's ornamental horticulture program

The centre was founded in 1914 as the Dominion Experimental Farm at Summerland. It was renamed as the Summerland Research Station in 1959 after the addition of plant pathology and entomology laboratories, and later combined with a nearby experimental farm (at Agassiz, British Columbia) to form the Pacific Agri-Food Research Centre in 1996. The centre was originally founded to research the suitability of different plant and animal species to local growing conditions, but later branched into plant pathology as well. Early in its history, the centre also had an ornamental horticulture department, beginning with a garden laid out in 1916 that grew into a 6-hectare English landscape garden. As the centre's priority shifted to tree fruits, this program was phased out, and in 1991 care of the ornamental gardens was taken over by a local garden society.

== Notable research ==
The Pacific Agri-Food Research Centre has been particularly important in the development of tree fruit varieties; it is estimated that approximately 75–80% of cherries eaten worldwide are from varieties developed there. The technology and processes to manufacture commercial fruit leather were also developed at the centre.

Some notable fruit varieties developed at the Pacific Agri-Food Research Centre include:

- Aurora Golden Gala apple
- Coronation (grape)
- Creston (apple)
- Jubilee apple
- Lapins cherry
- Nicola (apple)
- Skeena cherry
- Spartan (apple)
- Stella cherry
- Sweetheart cherry
- Van cherry
Selected cultivars developed at the Pacific Agri-Food Research Centre
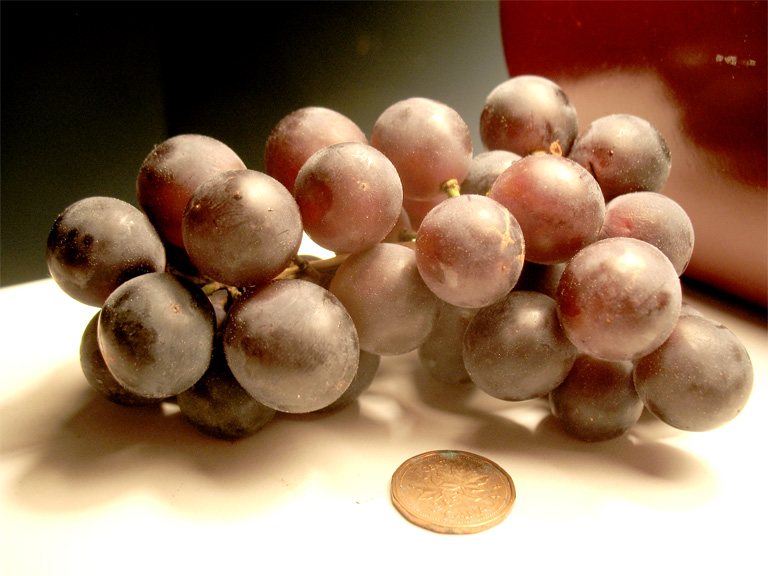
Coronation grapes

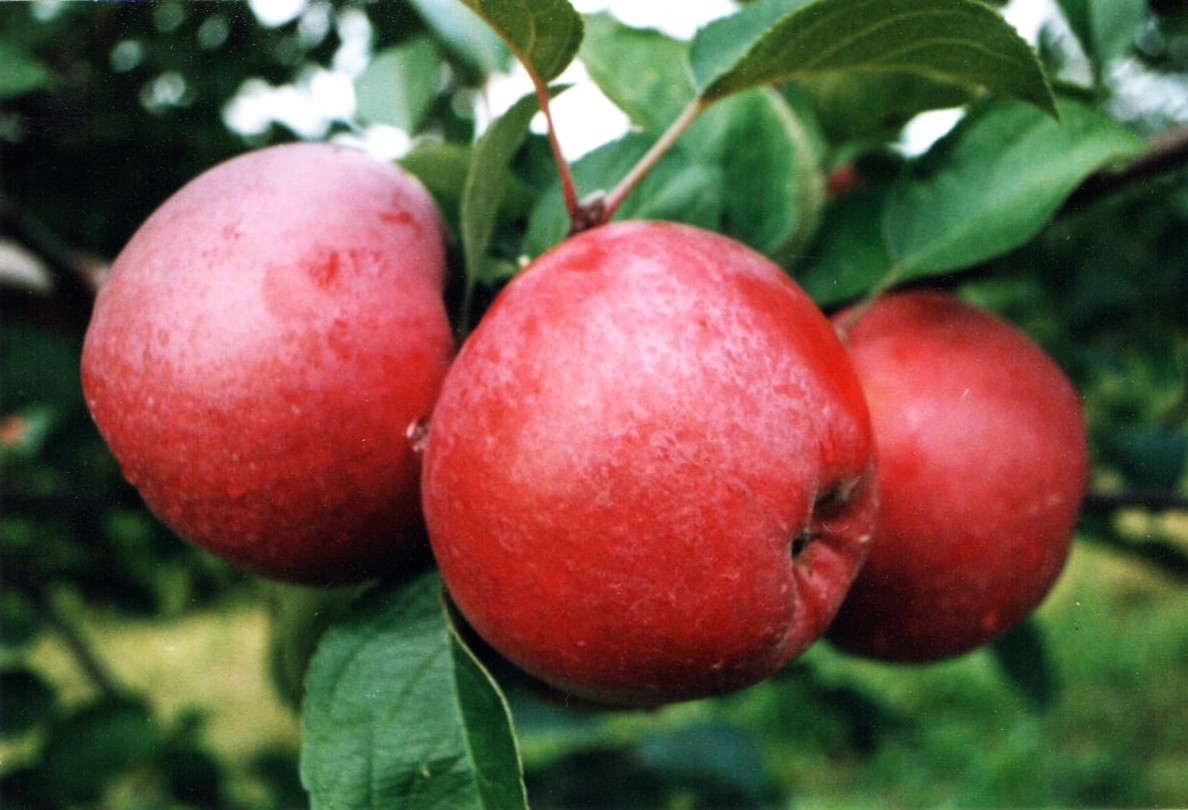
Spartan apples

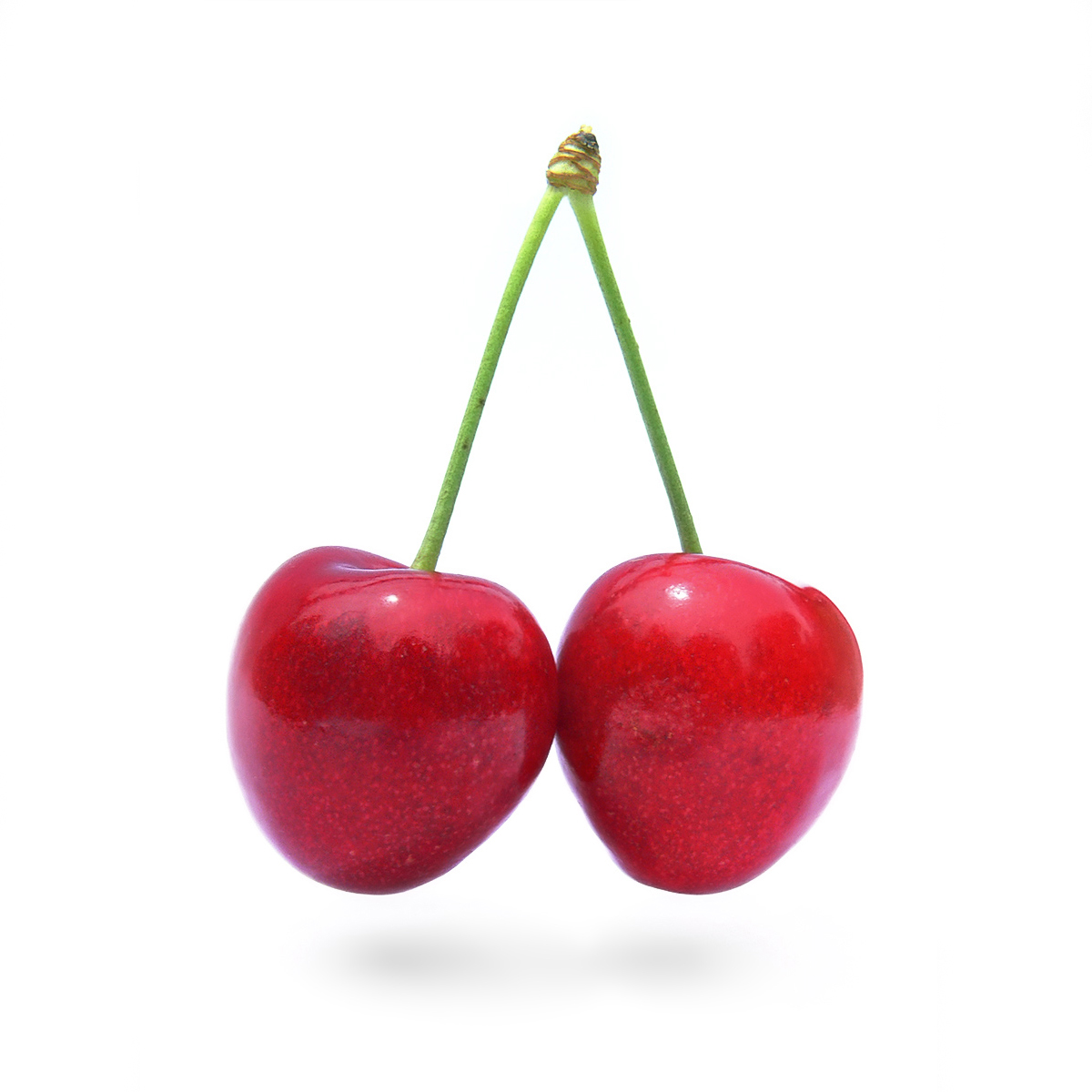
Stella cherries

The centre also holds the Canadian Plant Virus Collection, which includes specimens of many plant viruses, some freeze-dried and others maintained alive in perennial plants. The collection, one of the largest of its kind in the world, includes more than 350 isolated strains of 160 viruses, which are available for use as reference material in the event of viral outbreaks.

== Registered historical site ==
The former superintendent's residence at the centre is a listed site at the Canadian Register of Historic Places since 1990. Constructed between 1923 and 1926, the house is set within a private garden within the research station, and is the oldest surviving structure at the site. Initially built to house the station superintendent, it has not been used for that purpose since 1969, instead being used for an administration building, library, and museum.

== See also ==
- Central Experimental Farm
- Dominion Experimental Farm at Indian Head, Saskatchewan
