= Creston (apple) =

Apple cultivar

Malus domestica 'Creston'
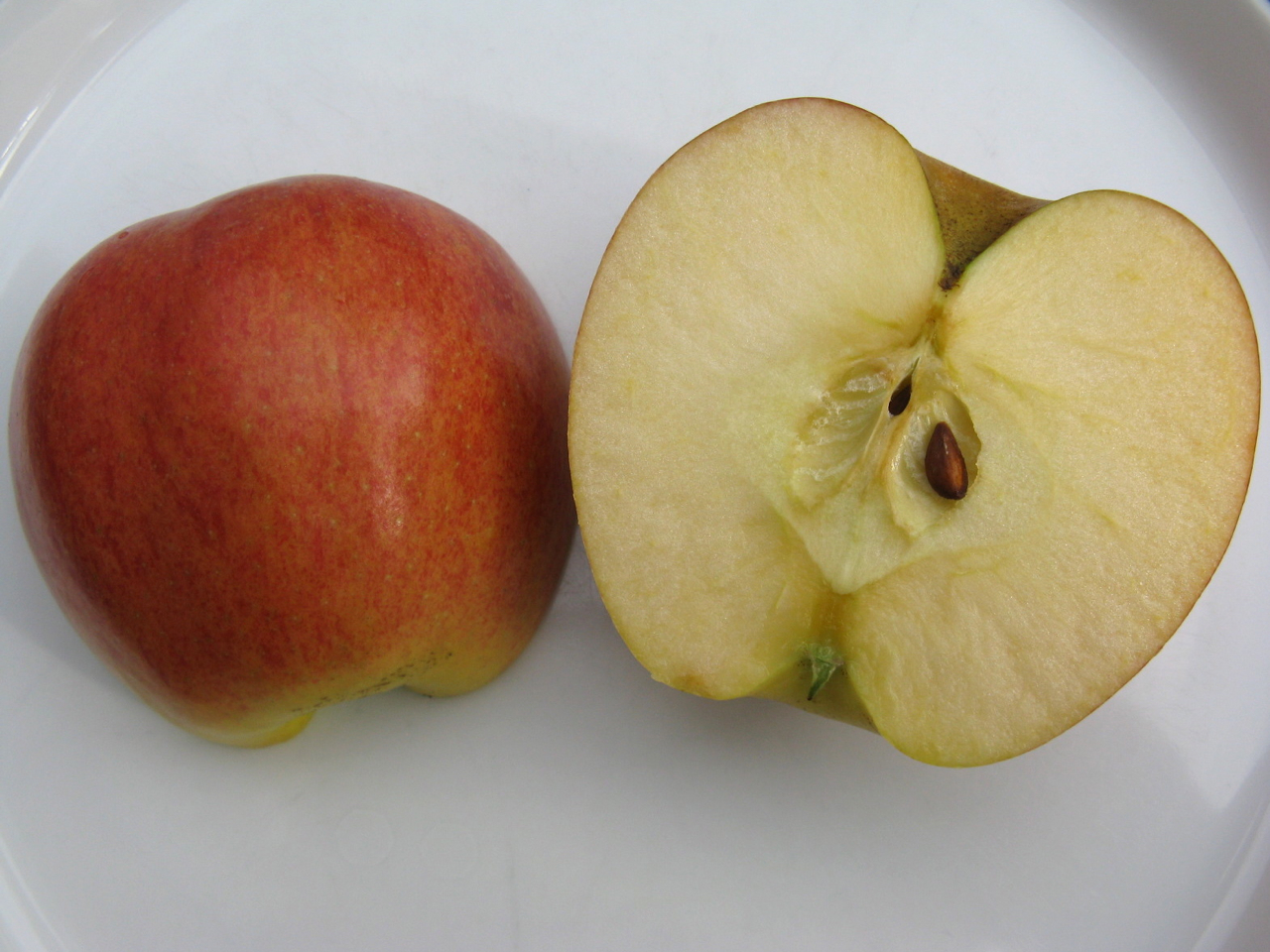
- Hybrid parentage: Malus domestica 'Golden Delicious' × NJ 381049
- Cultivar: 'Creston'
- Origin: Pacific Agri-Food Research Centre, Summerland, British Columbia, Canada, selected 1969–1976

'Creston' is an apple cultivar released by the Pacific Agri-Food Research Centre at Summerland, British Columbia.

== Characteristics ==
'Creston' is a triploid, with poor pollen production and seedlings from it are generally weak. Its fruit are large, self-thinning, resembling 'Jonagold', with good keeping characteristics, flavour, and texture. They are suitable for eating fresh, and for making pies and applesauce.
