= Nicola (apple) =

Apple cultivar

Nicola is the trade name of the apple cultivar SPA440, a cross between the apples 'Splendour' and 'Gala' made at the Pacific Agri-Food Research Centre (PARC), Summerland, BC. Nicola is a mid-late season apple, typically harvested at 3-4 on the Cornell general Starch chart. Fruit is bicolour, large in size and typically a solid fire engine red over colour, (~80%) over a yellow-green background colour. Fruit is crisp, juicy, and sweet and stores well, with full aromatic flavours developing after several weeks of storage.

Nicola is currently available in Canada, as well as natural grocery stores in Oregon (i.e. New Seasons Market) and Maryland (i.e MOM's Organic Market), and possibly other states within the United States. Plantings are limited in size, but growing yearly with greater production coming online in 2010.
