= Rube (nickname) =

Rube is also a nickname or hypocorism, short for Reuben, Ruben or Ruby. People so named include:

== Arts and entertainment ==
- Rube Bloom (1902–1976), Jewish American songwriter, pianist, arranger, band leader, vocalist and writer
- Rube Goldberg (1883–1970), American cartoonist, sculptor, author, engineer, and inventor
- Rubin Lacey (1902–1969), American country blues musician, singer and songwriter
- Rube, a title character of Rube and Mandy at Coney Island, a 1903 short film

== Sports ==
=== Baseball ===
- Rube Benton (1890–1937), American Major League Baseball pitcher
- Rube Bressler (1894–1966), American Major League Baseball pitcher
- Rube Curry (1898–1966), American baseball pitcher and manager in the Negro leagues
- Rube DeGroff (1879–1955), American Major League Baseball player
- George "Rube" Deneau (c. 1879–1926), Canadian minor league baseball player, manager and promoter
- Rube Dessau (1883–1952), American Major League Baseball pitcher
- Rube Ehrhardt (1894–1980), American Major League Baseball pitcher
- Rube Ellis (1885–1938), American Major League Baseball player
- Rube Fischer (1916–1997), American Major League Baseball pitcher
- Rube Foster (1879–1930), American baseball player, manager, and pioneer executive in the Negro leagues, member of the Baseball Hall of Fame
- Rube Foster (baseball, born 1888) (1888–1976), American Major League Baseball player
- Rube Geyer (1884–1962), American Major League Baseball pitcher
- Rube Henderson (1894–1978), American Negro league pitcher
- Rube Kisinger (1876–1941), American Major League Baseball pitcher
- Rube Kroh (1886–1944), American Major League Baseball pitcher
- Rube Lutzke (1897–1938), American Major League Baseball player
- Rube Manning (1883–1930), American Major League Baseball pitcher
- Rube Marquard (1886–1980), American Major League Baseball pitcher, member of the Baseball Hall of Fame
- Rube Marshall (1890–1980), American Major League Baseball pitcher
- Rube Melton (1917–1971), American Major League Baseball pitcher
- Rube Novotney (1924–1987), American Major League Baseball player in 1949
- Rube Oldring (1884–1961), American Major League Baseball player
- Rube Parnham (1894–1963), American Major League Baseball pitcher
- Rube Peters (1885–1965), American Major League Baseball pitcher
- Hank Robinson (1887–1965), American Major League Baseball pitcher
- Rube Schauer (1891–1957), Major League Baseball pitcher
- Rube Sellers (1881–1952), American Major League Baseball player in 1910
- Rube Vickers (1878–1958), American Major League Baseball pitcher
- Rube Vinson (1879–1951), American Major League Baseball player
- Rube Waddell (1876–1914), American Major League Baseball pitcher
- Rube Walberg (1896–1978), American Major League Baseball pitcher
- Rube Walker (1926–1992), American Major League Baseball catcher and pitching coach
- Rube Ward (1879–1945), American Major League Baseball player in 1902
- Rube Yarrison (1896–1977), American Major League Baseball pitcher

=== Other sports ===
- Rube Barker (1889–1958), American college football player and track athlete
- Rube Bjorkman (born 1929), American former college ice hockey head coach
- Rube Brandow (1898–1932), Canadian professional ice hockey player and college coach
- Rube Ferns (1873–1952), American boxer, world welterweight champion in 1900 and 1901
- Rube Lautenschlager (1915–1992), American college and professional basketball player
- Rube Ludwig (c. 1920–1991), Canadian professional football player
- Rube Marquardt (1894–1973), American professional football player
- Rube McCray (1904–1972), head football, men's basketball, and baseball coach and athletic director at the College of William & Mary
- Rube Reiswerg (1912–1998), American professional basketball player
- Rubin Russell (born 1944), American former professional basketball player
- Rube Ursella (1890–1980), American football player-coach who played during the early years of the National Football League
- Reuben Charles Warnes (1875–1961), British boxer

== Other ==
- Rube Burrow (1854–1890), American Old West train robber and outlaw
