= Black Republican cherry =

Edible fruit cultivar

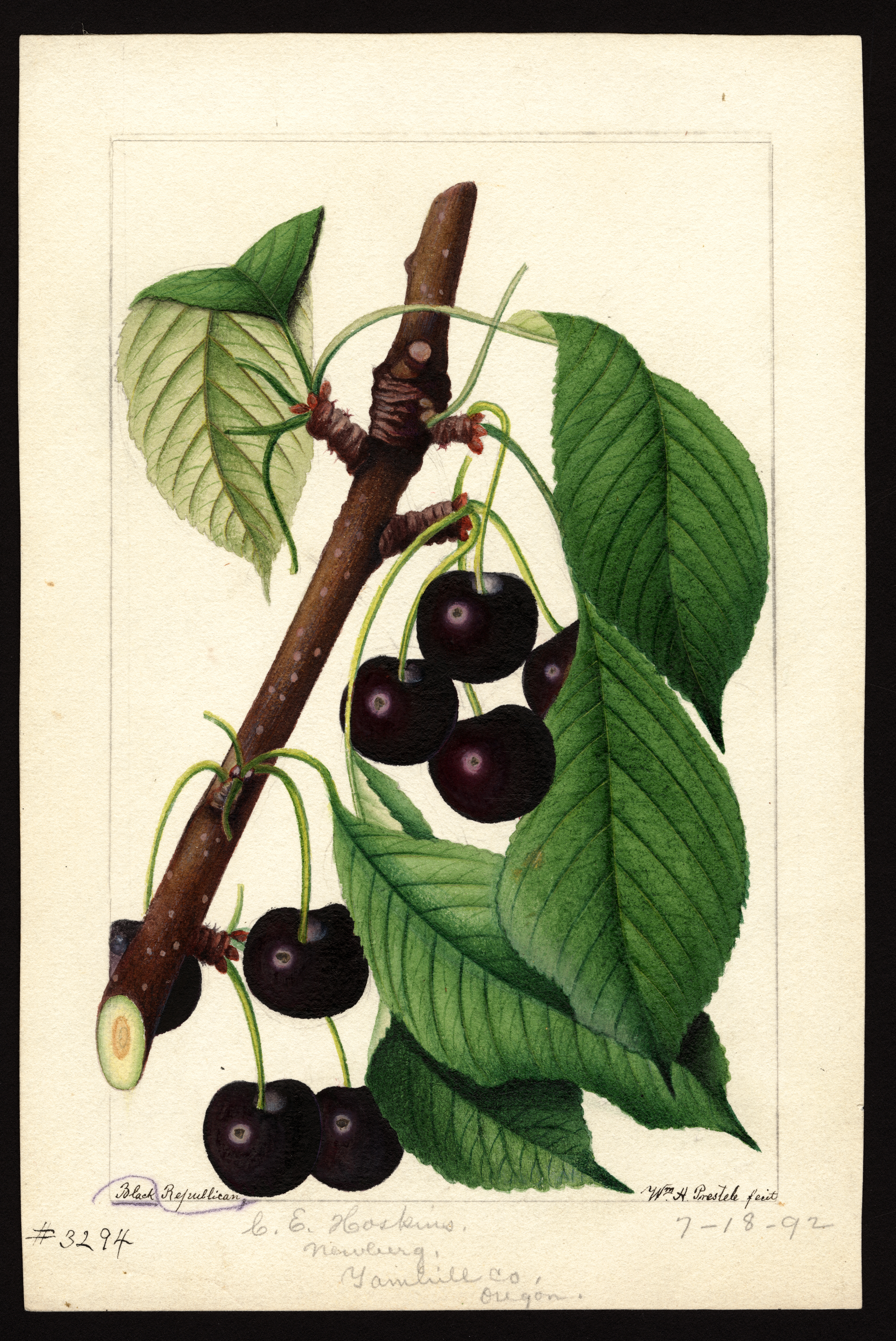
- Image of Black Republican cherries, from the USDA Pomological Watercolor Collection
- Genus: Prunus
- Species: Prunus avium
- Cultivar: 'Black Republican'
- Breeder: Seth Lewelling
- Origin: Oregon, United States, c. 1860

The Black Republican cherry is a cultivar of Prunus avium, sweet cherry, that originated in Milwaukie, Oregon. The cherry's parentage is uncertain; it began as a chance seedling that the horticulturist Seth Lewelling found in 1860 and let grow up. Lewelling thought the seed came from a Black Eagle cherry tree, but he did not know the other parent. After several years, he decided to propagate the tree, because of its big—for the time—and firm fruit. Because the Black Republican was the first cherry that stood up well to shipping, Lewelling made more money from it than he did from any other fruit he bred. The cultivar was widely planted in both Oregon and California.

The name Black Republican originated as a slur against abolitionists, Republicans, and, in Oregon, even Democrats who opposed a politically dominant group of Democrats known as the Salem Clique. Lewelling, whose came from a family of abolitionist Quakers, named his cherry, in 1864, shortly after the National Union Party had nominated Abraham Lincoln for re-election and called for a constitutional ban on slavery. "It being a time of great political excitement," Lewelling explained, he was "feeling somewhat patriotic."

The fruit of the Black Republican is fairly small by modern standards. It is firm and deep purple in color. Some say it has an intense taste and is well-suited to preserving. But by the early twentieth century the Black Republican was being surpassed by its offspring, the Bing cherry. Today the Black Republican is a rare variety, with about 200 acres in commercial production. The cherry is listed as an endangered heritage food in the Ark of Taste. For home growers, the tree is available from some West Coast nurseries.
