= Meadowcroft Chinook =

American homebuilt aircraft

General information
- Type: Homebuilt aircraft
- National origin: United States of America
- Designer: Bill Meadowcroft
- Number built: 1

History
- First flight: 1958

The Meadowcroft Chinook is a two-seat mid-winged American homebuilt aircraft design first flown in 1958.

== Development ==
The Chinook was designed for maximum stability on the ground and the air with a roomy cockpit.

== Design ==
The wing was patterned from the Ace Baby Ace homebuilt. The aircraft is a tricycle geared side-by-side seat mid-winged aircraft with a steeply raked windscreen. Each wing is braced with two small wing struts attached to the lower fuselage. The low rudder is capped with a strut braced horizontal stabilizer in a T-tail arrangement. The main gear is sourced from a Cessna 140. The aircraft can be reconfigured to be towed on its main gear by a vehicle.

== Specifications (Meadowcroft Chinook) ==
Data from Sport Aviation

General characteristics

- Capacity: 2
- Airfoil: NACA 23012
- Powerplant: 1 × Continental C-90-12F , 90 hp (67 kW)
- Propellers: <2!-- propeller aircraft -->-bladed McCaulley

Performance

- Cruise speed: 109 kn (125 mph, 201 km/h)
