= Henderson Luelling =

American horticulturist, Quaker and abolitionist

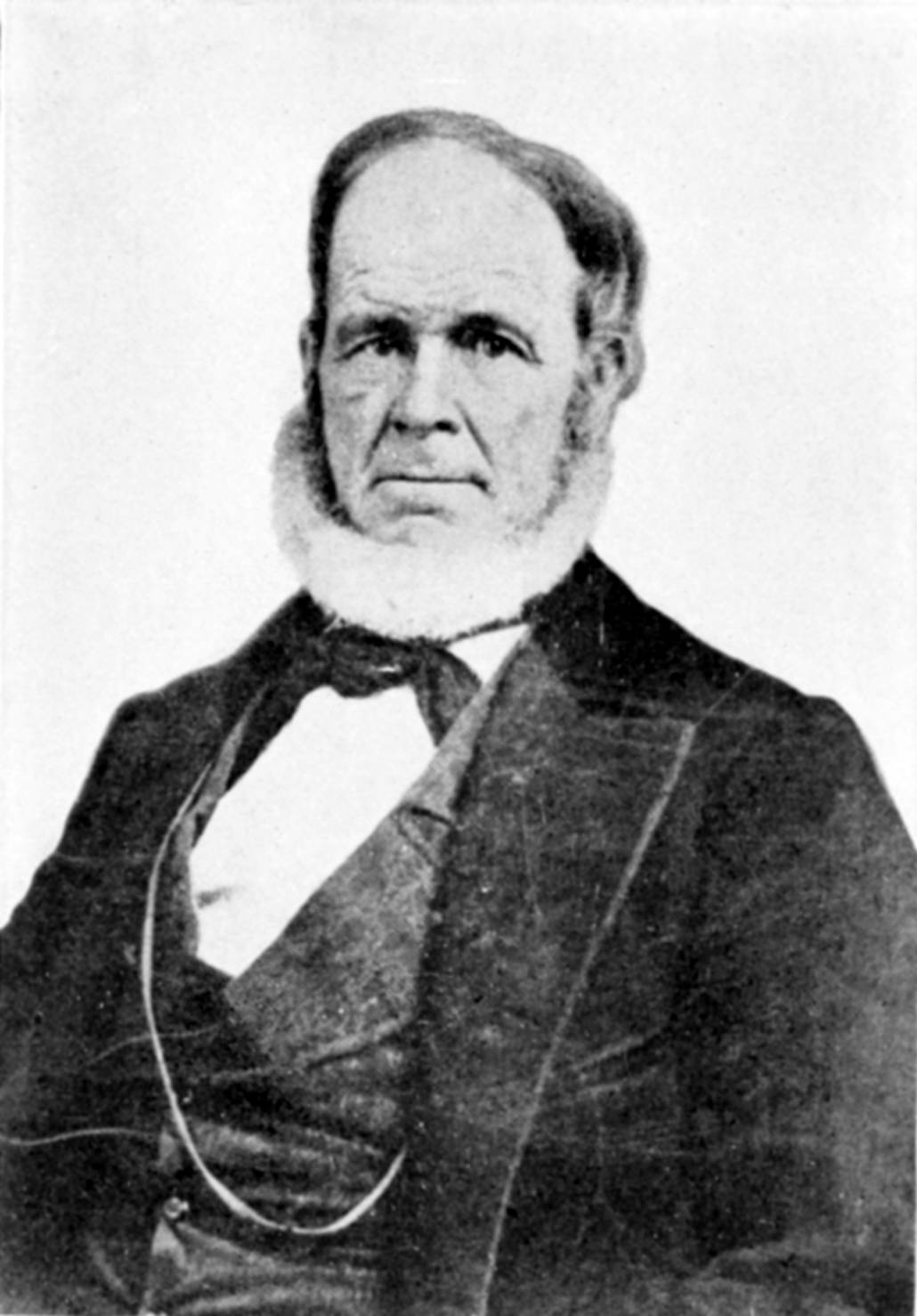
Henderson Luelling, Quaker nurseryman and orchardist who planted the first orchard of grafted fruit trees in Oregon and founded Fruitvale, California

Henderson William Luelling (April 23, 1809 – December 28, 1878) was an American horticulturist, Quaker, abolitionist and early settler of what is today Oakland, California. He introduced varietal fruits to the Pacific coast, first to Oregon and later to California, and gave the Fruitvale district its name. In his later years, he led a utopian community from California to Honduras, only to encounter overwhelming adversity, which sent him back to California.

== Early life: horticulture and abolitionism ==
Luelling was born on April 23, 1809, in Randolph County, North Carolina, where he lived until 1822.

Luelling and his brother John went into the nursery business together in Henry County, Indiana in 1835. Henderson moved to Salem, Iowa in 1837, purchasing land for a nursery jointly with John. John disposed of the Indiana property and joined Henderson in 1841. They also established a dry goods store.

In the early 1840s, Luelling and his wife, Jane Elizabeth Presnall Luelling, built a two-story stone residence with features for hiding escaped slaves from Missouri (it is now the Salem Quaker Museum, also known as the Henderson Lewelling House). They were ousted from the Salem Monthly Meeting of Friends for their abolitionist activities.

== The first orchards on the west coast ==
Luelling and his family (including eight children) departed for Oregon in 1847. They brought a wagonload of 700 fruit trees, half of which survived the journey. The trees would produce a variety of fruits that would ripen from summer through winter. Luelling partnered with William Meek, a fellow Iowan. Meek had also brought some grafted trees from Iowa. The two established an orchard and nursery where Milwaukie would soon be founded. Luelling's brother Seth joined them in 1850 and took over the Milwaukie Nursery when Henderson Luelling moved to California.

Luelling sold trees for US$1 to 1.50 each. The nursery supplied trees for settlers' orchards throughout the Oregon Territory and in California. Luelling enhanced the nursery's selection through a voyage by steamship, in 1850 to 1851, to New York, where he bought trees from Andrew Jackson Downing’s Botanic Garden and Nurseries and from George Ellwanger and Patrick Barry’s Mount Hope Nursery.

The Luelling brothers' horticultural accomplishments have been described as the source of much of Milwaukie's early fame. The site of their first nursery in Milwaukie is now the Waverley Country Club.

Henderson moved to the San Francisco Bay Area in 1854. Seth continued to operate the Milwaukie nursery for many years, and it became a hub for populist and progressive political organization decades later.

Henderson bought 50 acres at the southern end of Alameda County, but after a title dispute, bought about 600 acres on Sausal Creek in what is now Oakland. The estate he established was called Fruit Vale, the namesake of the present neighborhood of Fruitvale.

The contributions of Luelling and Meek were acknowledged in Frances Fuller Victor's History of Oregon, vol. 1.

== Utopian ambitions ==
Luelling outlived each of his first three wives. His fourth he abandoned in California when he sold his orchard and business and left for Honduras in 1859, hoping to establish a utopian community called the Harmonial Brotherhood. The venture was a failure, and he returned to California the next year. He died in December 1878, and was buried in Mountain View Cemetery.

== Surname ==
In many records Henderson's family name is spelled Lewelling, and he used that spelling until soon after his move to Oregon. According to Henderson's son Alfred, the spelling had been changed from the original Welsh Llewellyn by Henderson's father, prior to Henderson's birth. Henderson's brother Seth adopted the Luelling spelling and used it for almost thirty years, but he reverted to the Lewelling spelling later in life.

== Television depiction ==
The actor Royal Dano was cast as Luelling in the 1965 episode, "The Traveling Trees," on the syndicated television series, Death Valley Days, hosted by Ronald Reagan. In the story line, Luelling, against the advice of his wagon master, takes the Hastings Cutoff to Oregon, where he intends to plant an apple orchard. Tim McIntire appeared as a young reformed outlaw, Ben Fraser, with Robert Yuro as Ben's older brother, Spencer Fraser.

== Literary depictions ==
Two children's books tell the story of Henderson Luelling and how he brought grafted fruit trees to Oregon: Tree Wagon, by Evelyn Sibley (1953), and Apples to Oregon, by Deborah Hopkinson (2008). The latter is only loosely based on the Luelling story.

== See also ==
- Henderson Lewelling House
- Joseph Hamilton Lambert
