= Hey Rube =

Hey Rube may refer to:

- Hey, Rube!, a circus slang term
- Hey Rube!, a 1928 silent film directed by George B. Seitz
- Hey Rube (book), a book by Hunter S. Thompson, published 2004
- Hey, Rube! (band), a British electronica group formed by Steve Cobby and Stephen Mallinder
