= Stella cherry =

Edible fruit cultivar

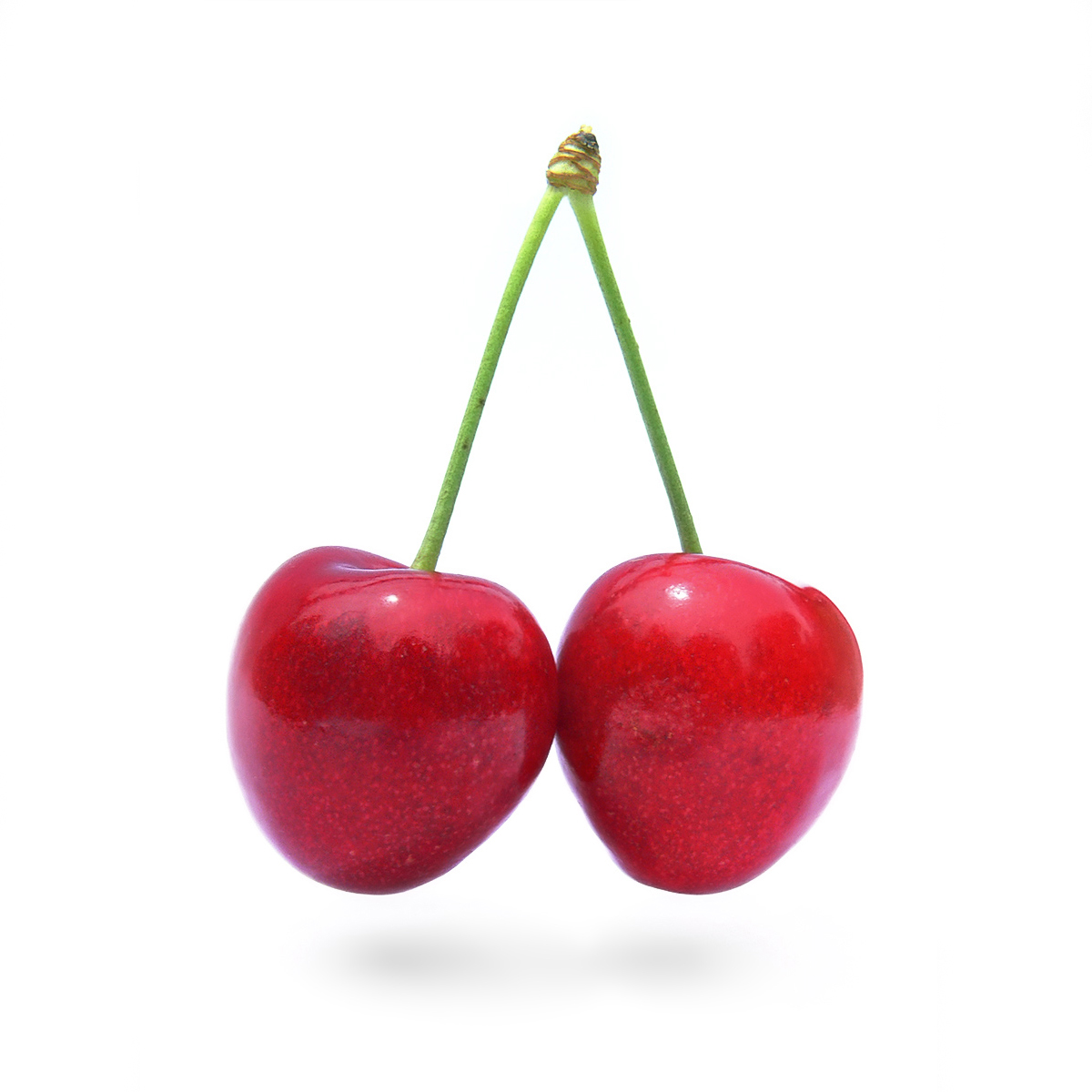
- Genus: Prunus
- Species: Prunus avium
- Hybrid parentage: Lambert × John Innes Seedling 2420
- Cultivar: Stella
- Breeder: K. O. Lapins
- Origin: Summerland, British Columbia, Canada

Stella is a cultivar of cherry developed in British Columbia, Canada. It is notable as the first self-fertile sweet cherry to be named. It has been awarded the Royal Horticultural Society's Award of Garden Merit.

== Cultivar history ==
The Stella variety was the result of a breeding program at the John Innes Institute in Norwich, England. That program developed three self-fertile seedlings, which were used in attempts to breed high-quality self-fertile cherry trees. One of the seedlings was crossed with the Lambert variety at the Summerland Research Station in Summerland, British Columbia in 1956 by K. O. Lapins (namesake of the Lapins cherry cultivar), and the resulting hybrid tree was named "Stella" in 1968. It has since been used to develop other cultivars, including the Chelan cherry.

== Tree characteristics ==
The Stella cherry tree is a vase-shaped tree with a mature height of about 20–30 feet and a spread of about 15 feet. The tree blossoms early and fruits early, with moderate to heavy crops. Though it is considered a universal pollinator for other sweet cherry varieties, it has been found to not pollinate the Bing cherry variety in some regions. The tree can grow well in USDA Hardiness Zones 5–8.

== Fruit characteristics ==
The fruit of the Stella cultivar is large, heart-shaped, and dark red, with overall excellent quality. It ripens about 1 week earlier than Bing.

== Compact Stella ==
A compact version of Stella was developed through X-ray irradiation of dormant Stella scions in 1964 at the Brookhaven National Laboratory in New York. This semi-dwarf variety of the cultivar grows to about half the size of the parent variety. It retains the parent variety's self-fertility and fruits early and heavily. It was named "Compact Stella" in 1973.
