= Lapins cherry =

Edible fruit cultivar

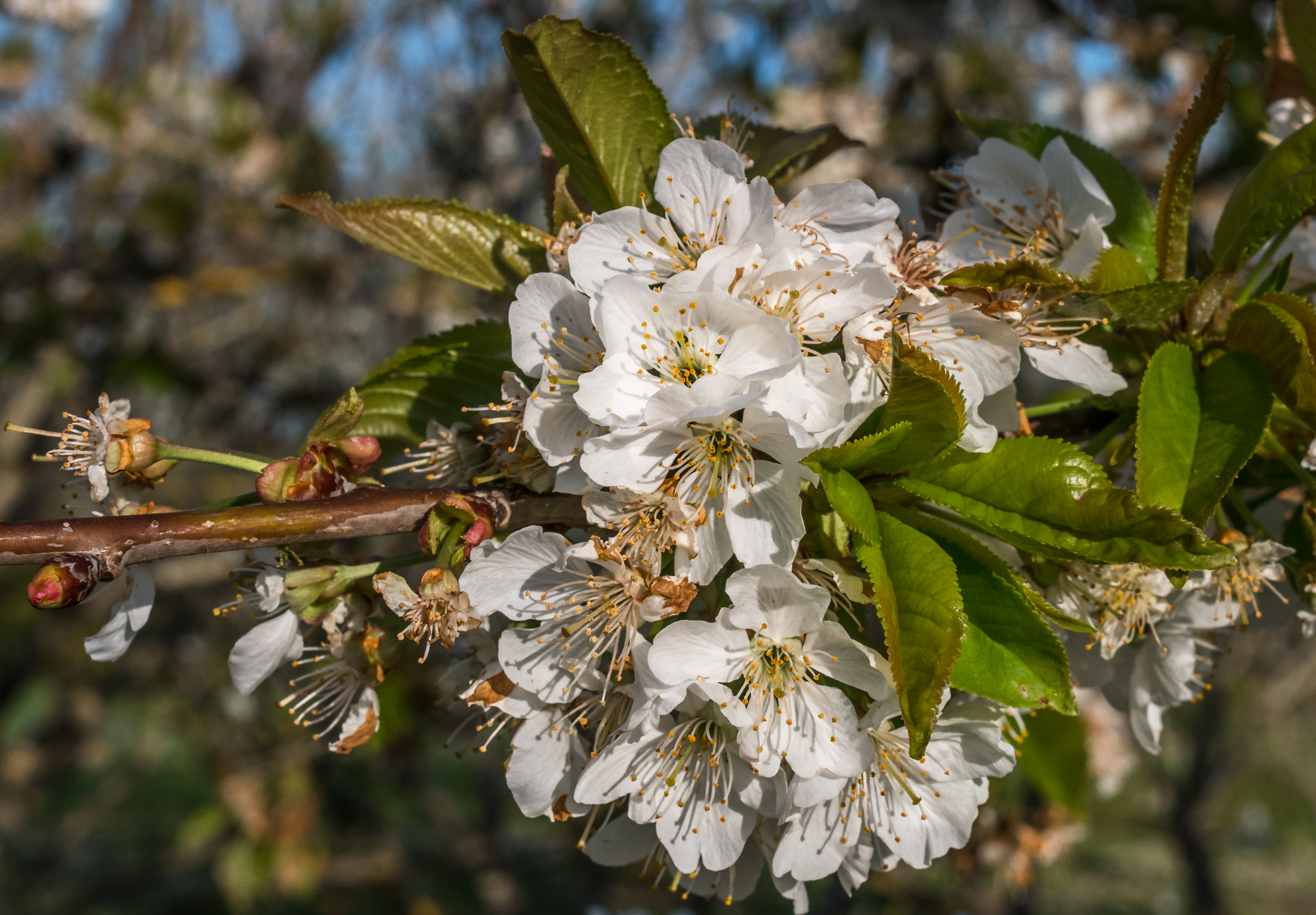
- flowers of a Lapins cherry tree
- Genus: Prunus
- Species: Prunus avium
- Hybrid parentage: Van × Stella
- Cultivar: Lapins
- Breeder: K. O. Lapins
- Origin: Summerland, British Columbia, Canada

Lapins (also marketed as Cherokee) is a cultivar of cherry. It is a hybrid of the Van and Stella cultivars. It has been awarded the Royal Horticultural Society's Award of Garden Merit.

== Cultivar history ==
The Lapins cultivar was developed in Summerland, British Columbia at the Summerland Research Station. It was one of the varieties developed by the agronomist Karlis O. Lapins (Lapiņš), a native of Latvia who did pioneering work in the development of self-fertile cherry cultivars. Though the cultivar was not released until 1983, years after his retirement, it was named in his honor.

== Tree characteristics ==
The Lapins cherry tree grows to 2.5 to 4 meters tall, with a 2.5 to 4 meters spread. It has dense, green foliage and a branch structure conducive to heavy yields. Like its parent variety Stella, the Lapins cherry is self-fertile and an excellent pollinator for other cherry varieties.

== Fruit characteristics ==
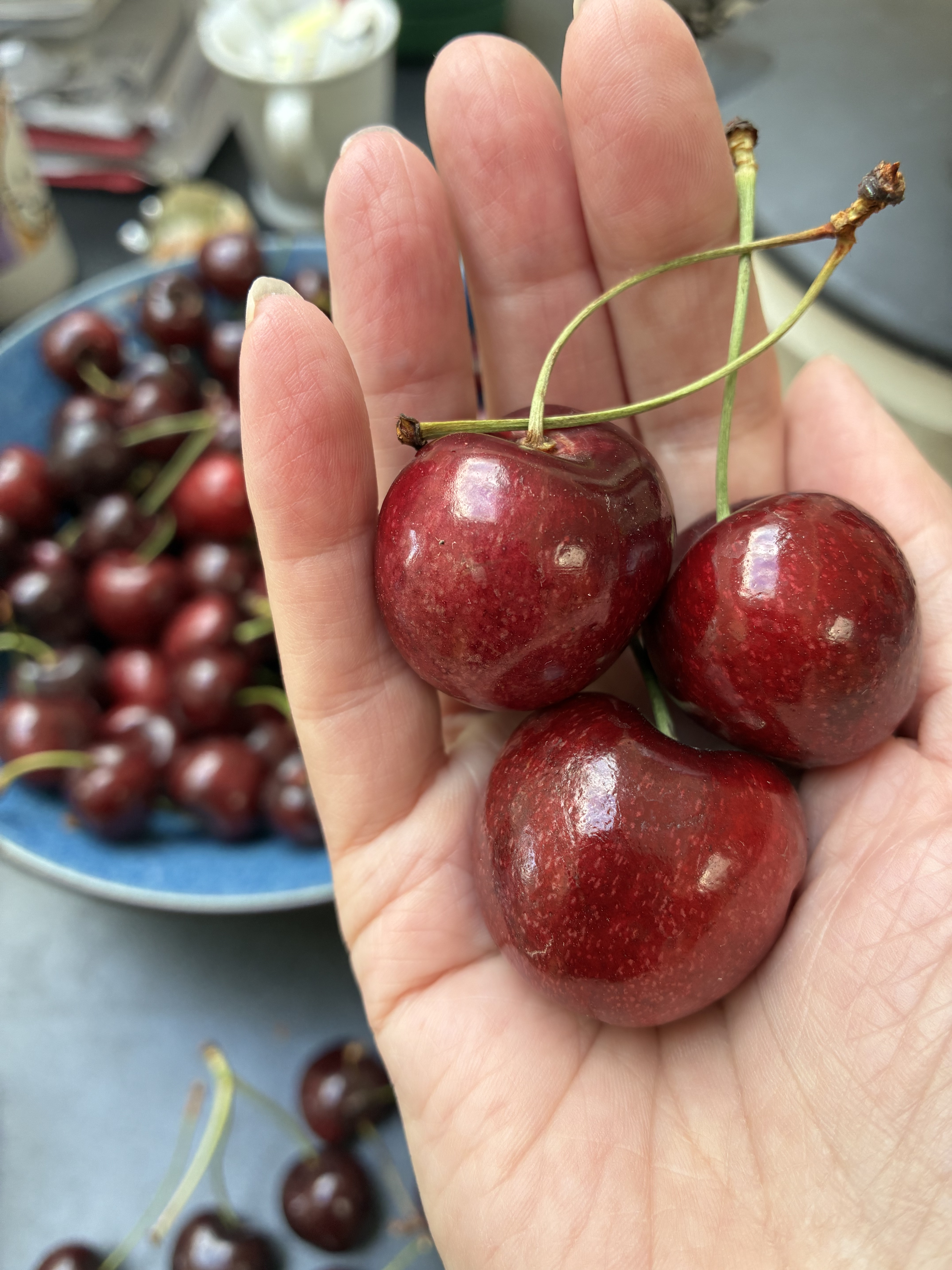
Lapins cherries grown in New Zealand

The fruit of the Lapins cultivar is regarded as very high quality. It turns deep red well before it is ready to pick, and unlike some varieties it is sweet while still red. Lapins is a late-season cherry, ripening about 2 weeks later than the Bing cherry. They are noted for having good split resistance.
