= Van cherry =

Cherry cultivar from Canada

- Genus: Prunus
- Species: Prunus avium
- Hybrid parentage: Empress Eugenie × open pollination
- Cultivar: Van
- Breeder: A. J. Mann
- Origin: Summerland, British Columbia, Canada

Van is a cultivar of cherry originating from Canada.

== Cultivar history ==
The Van cultivar originated from open pollination of an "Empress Eugenie" tree. It was developed in Summerland, British Columbia at the Summerland Research Station. The cross was made in 1936, selected in 1942, and introduced in 1944, with the resulting tree named in honor of horticulturalist J. R. Van Haarlen. The Van cherry was one of the parent varieties of the Lapins cherry and the Rainier cherry.

== Tree characteristics ==
The Van cherry tree is hardy, vigorous, and a heavy bearer, but overloading can cause it to produce small fruit. Like most cherry varieties, Van is self-incompatible; it can be pollinated by many other cherry varieties, including Bing, Montmorency, and Stella, among others. Van blooms about 3 days before Bing.

== Fruit characteristics ==
The Van cherry is a mid-season producer, ripening about 3 days before Bing. Its fruits are medium-sized, with dark red flesh and black skin, and sweet.

== Growing regions ==
Apart from Canada and the Pacific Northwest region of the United States, Van is also grown in Australia and Norway.
