= Seth Lewelling =

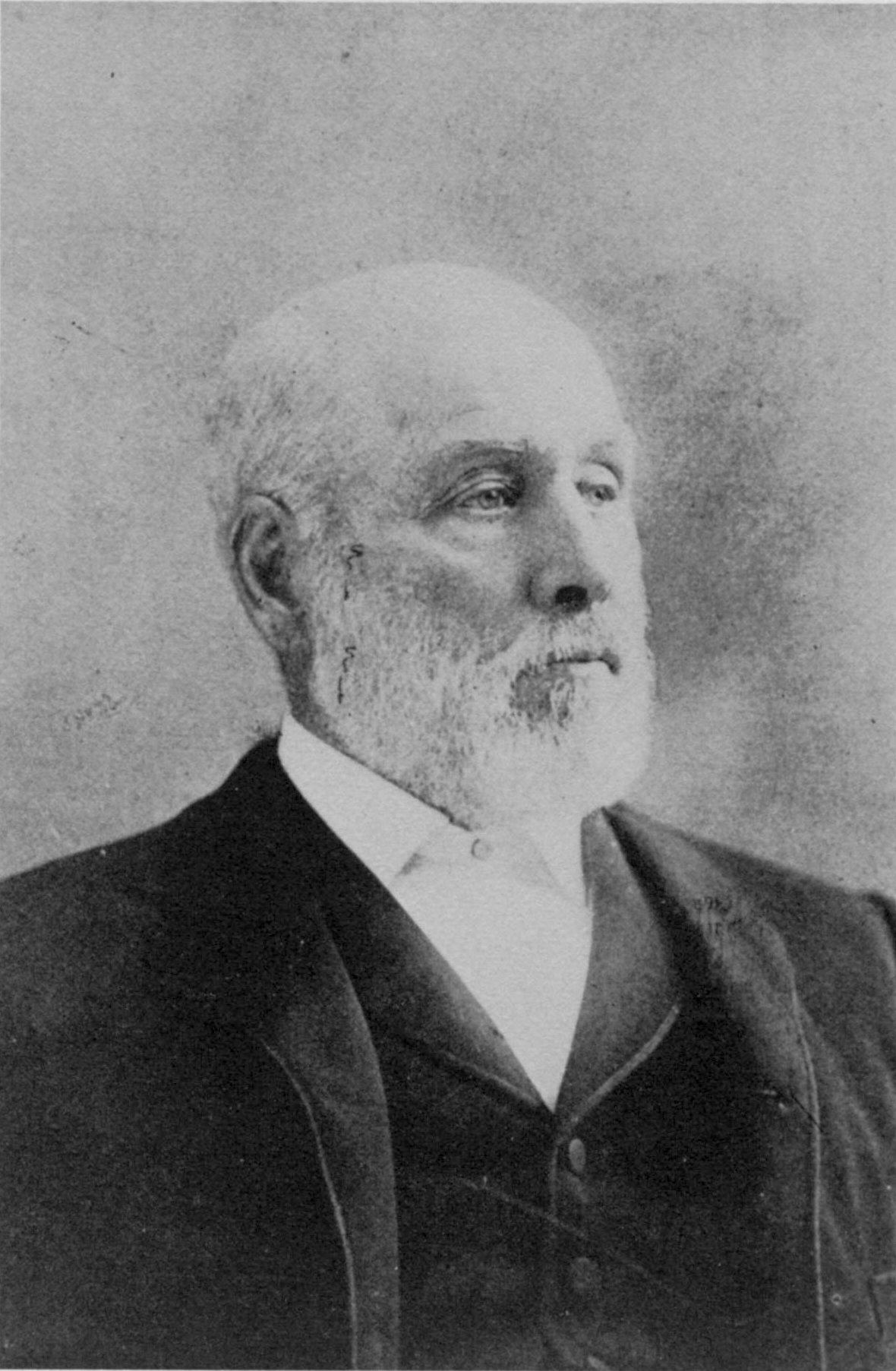
- Born: 1820; North Carolina, US
- Died: February 21, 1896 (aged 75–76); Milwaukie, Oregon, US
- Other name: Seth Luelling
- Occupation: Horticulturist
- Known for: Developed the Bing cherry
- Spouse(s): Clarissa Hosier, Sophronia Vaughn

Seth Lewelling (1820 – February 21, 1896), alternatively spelled Luelling (including by Lewelling himself), was a pioneer horticulturist from the U.S. state of Oregon, best known for developing the Bing cherry. Born in 1820 in North Carolina as Seth Lewelling, he used the spelling Luelling for part of his life but returned to Lewelling in his later years.

== Career ==
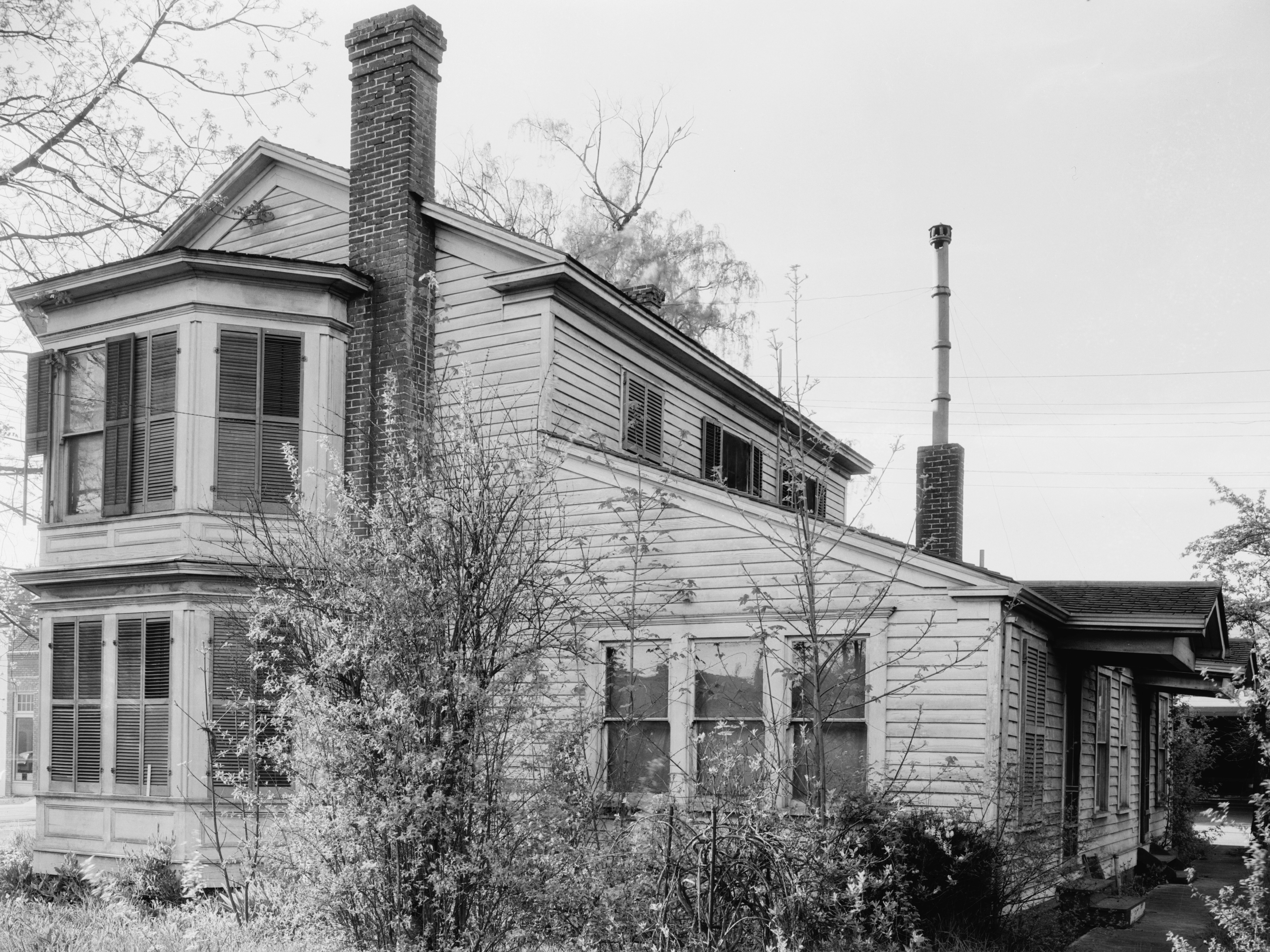
Lewelling's house, at 10966 McLoughlin Blvd., was demolished in 1940, and is now the site of a gas station.

His brother Henderson Luelling (who devised the new spelling of his family's name about 1850 and used it for the rest of his life) came to Oregon from Iowa in 1847, bringing a large wagon full of grafted fruit trees. He established an orchard and nursery in what soon became Milwaukie. Seth and their brother John came West to mine gold in 1850—Seth from Indiana and John from Iowa—and subsequently worked in Henderson's business in Oregon. Seth became the sole owner of the nursery by late 1856, and he established his own orchards as well. Eventually he also became a plant breeder. He developed several varieties of cherries, a rhubarb, a grape, and the Golden Prune, a yellow-skinned Italian plum. Among the cherries he developed were the Lincoln and the Black Republican. About 1879, he selected the Bing cherry, still the most produced sweet cherry cultivar in the United States. The Bing Cherry was developed by Lewelling and his foreman, Ah Bing, for whom the cherry is named.

== Political involvement ==
As Quakers, Lewelling's family were opposed to slavery, and his brothers Henderson, John, and William were active abolitionists in Iowa before Henderson left for Oregon. Although Seth Lewelling isn't known to have engaged in abolitionist work himself, the names he gave to his cherries reflect his anti-slavery views. He did not become active in politics, however, until after marrying his second wife, Sophronia Vaughn Lewelling, in 1885. With Henderson Luelling's son Alfred, the couple became leaders first in the Farmers' Alliance and subsequently in the Populist Party.

Seth and Sophronia played an important role in Oregon's initiative and referendum movement. William S. U'Ren, a young lawyer recovering from tuberculosis, was introduced to the Lewellings in 1892.They invited him to stay on the farm, and Seth later hired him as manager of the nursery. U'Ren found his life's calling through the Farmers' Alliance meetings in the Lewelling home. With financial support from Seth and campaign help from Sophronia, Alfred, and other Milwaukie residents, U'Ren was eventually able to get Oregon's initiative and referendum system passed by popular vote. U'Ren went on to achieve other populist reforms in the state.

== Death ==
Lewelling suffered a partially paralyzing stroke on July 1, 1895. He died at his home in Milwaukie on February 21, 1896.

== Legacy ==
Seth Lewelling is one of the 158 names of people important to Oregon's history that are painted in the House and Senate chambers of the Oregon State Capitol. Lewelling's name is in the Senate chamber. Seth Lewelling Elementary School and the Lewelling neighborhood in Milwaukie are named for him.
