= Bing cherry =

Edible fruit cultivar

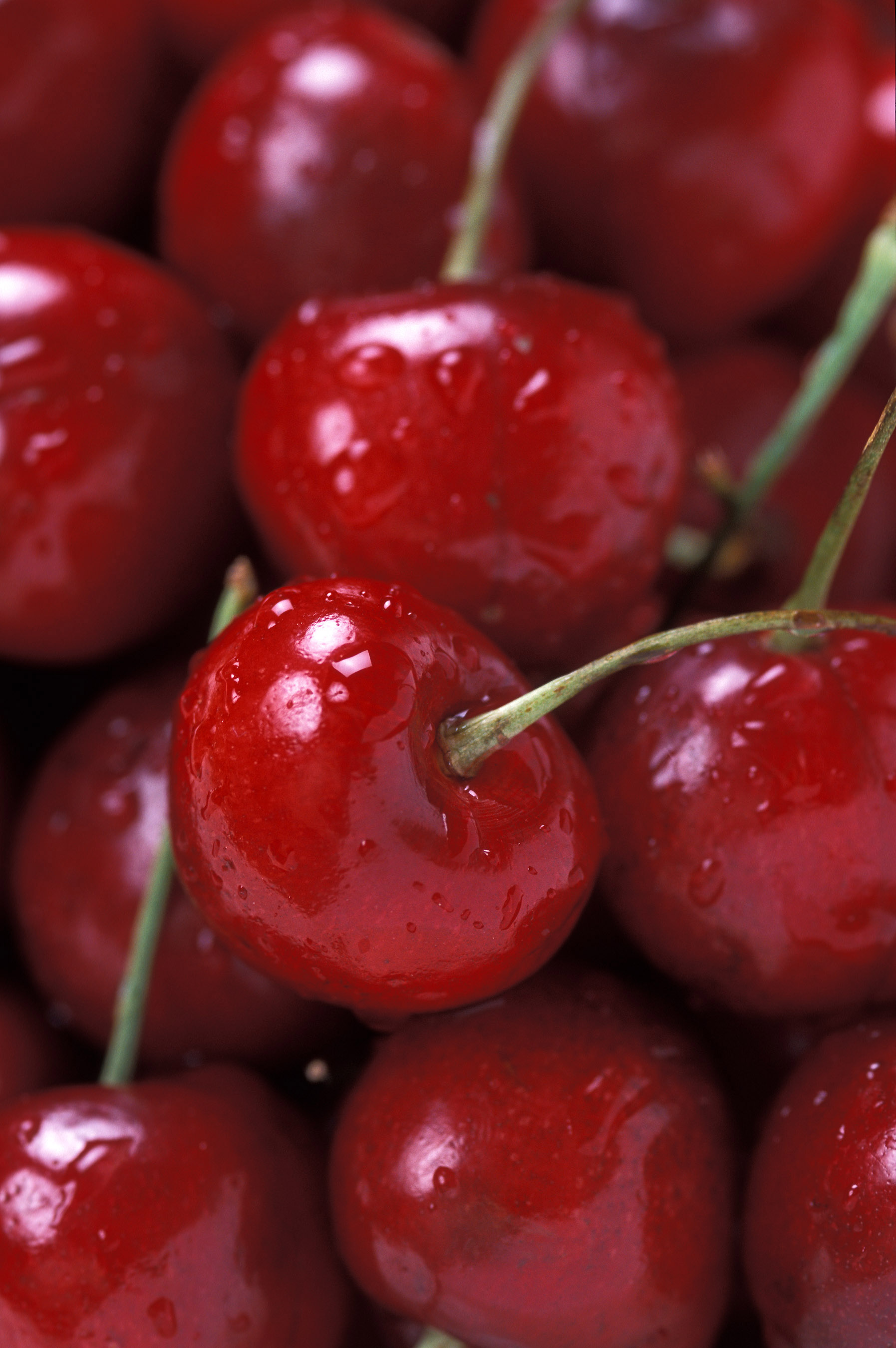
- Bing cherry fruits
- Genus: Prunus
- Species: Prunus avium
- Hybrid parentage: Black Republican cherry × Royal Ann cherry
- Cultivar: Bing
- Breeder: Seth Lewelling and Ah Bing
- Origin: Milwaukie, Oregon, USA

Bing is a cultivar of the wild or sweet cherry (Prunus avium) that originated in the Pacific Northwest. The Bing is the most popular sweet cherry in the United States, making up 50% of Washington's nation-leading cherry crop. It is also a major cultivar in British Columbia, Canada.

== History ==
The cultivar was derived from an open pollination cross between maternal parent Black Republican and paternal parent Royal Ann (also known as 'Napoleon') in 1875 in Milwaukie, Oregon, by horticulturist Seth Lewelling and his Chinese ranch foreman Sit Ah Bing, for whom the cultivar is named.

Ah Bing was born in China about 1846. He worked on Seth Lewelling's farm in Milwaukie for about 16 years. He went back to China about 1889. Due to the restrictions of the Scott Act, he could not return to the United States.

In a Federal Writers' Project interview of 1939, Seth Lewelling's stepdaughter, Florence Olson, explained that Lewelling and Bing were working alternate rows in the orchard when they found a seedling tree with superior fruit. Florence said Lewelling named it for Bing because the cherries were big, as Bing was, and because it was in Bing's row.

The Bing cherry won first premium at the 1893 Columbian Exposition in Chicago. The cherry was little appreciated, however, until about a decade later. By 1905, according to the horticulturist H. M. Williamson, it was "fast supplanting its parent, the Black Republican," largely because of its larger size.

== Health ==
Bing cherries are high in antioxidants. A study by the United States Department of Agriculture suggests that fresh Bing cherries may help sufferers of arthritis and gout. The U.S. Food and Drug Administration said that these claims are unproven.

== See also ==
- Bing (disambiguation)
- List of foods named after people
