= C17H26O5 =

The molecular formula C_{17}H_{26}O_{5} (molar mass: 310.385 g/mol, exact mass: 310.1780 u) may refer to:

- Botrydial
- Portentol
