= Lettuce production in China =

Production of lettuce in China

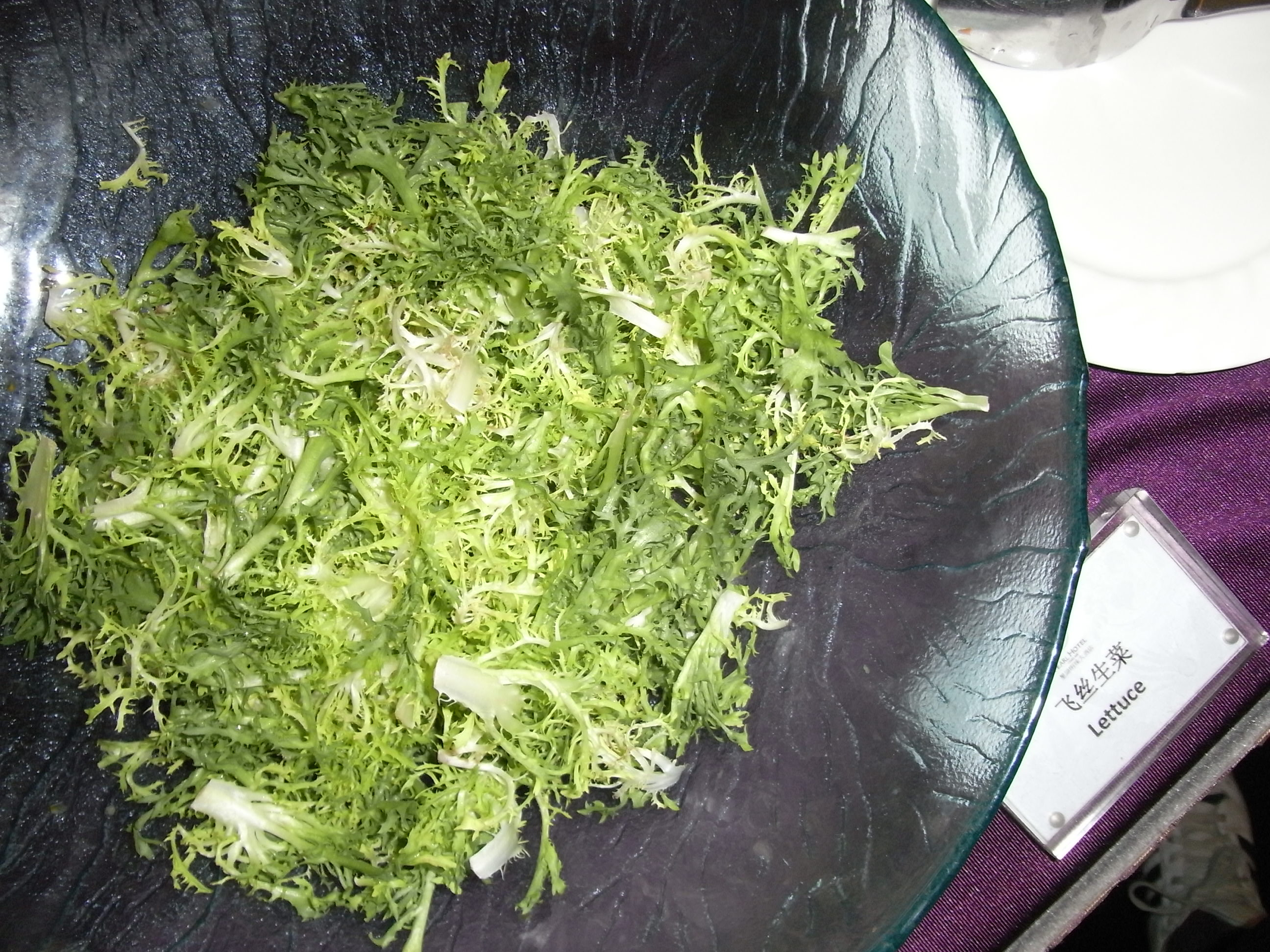
Lettuce buffet in Duanzhou, Zhaoqing, Guangdong, China.

China is the world leader in lettuce production, producing half of the world's lettuce. Stem lettuce is grown in the country and the stems are prepared as a cooked vegetable. According to estimates given by the Food and Agriculture Organization (FAO) in 2006, China produced around 11,005,000 metric tonnes of lettuce on 500,250 hectares of land. In 2010, the FAO reported that some 12,574,500 tonnes (12,375,900 long tons; 13,861,000 short tons) of lettuce were produced during that year. Taiwan is also a producer of good quality head lettuce, which is an export commodity.

== History ==
China first started growing lettuce (Lactuta sativa L.) in the seventh century, according to one source, although another source writes that lettuce was introduced earlier, in the fifth century. (Note: A third source states that it was in 600–900 A.D. that lettuce was introduced to China.) It is not quite clear as to how lettuce got to China. The country has long been the leading lettuce producer in the world, with roughly 8,000,000 metric tons (7,900,000 long tons; 8,800,000 short tons) of lettuce produced in 2005, and 11,005,000 metric tons (10,831,000 long tons; 12,131,000 short tons) on 500,250 hectares (1,236,100 acres) in 2006. China accounts for around half of the world's total lettuce production. (Note: Various figures given: 48% (2005), and 50% (2006).)

== Agriculture ==
As per FAO's Preliminary Statistics for 2011 for China, the area under lettuce and chicory was 570,302 hectares (1,409,250 acres) with a total production of 13.431 million tonnes. Most of the lettuce produced in China is purchased and consumed within the country.

The common types of lettuce grown are the Butterhead (Lactuca sativa var. capitata), the Crisphead (Lactuca sativa var. capitata), the Looseleaf (Lactuca sativa var. crispa), the Romaine (Lactuca sativa var. longifolia), and the Celtuce. Celtuce is grown widely in the country and its stems are prepared as a cooked vegetable. Celtuce (Lactuca sativa var. angustana), an endemic plant of China, is also called stem lettuce. The name is derived from two words “celery” and “lettuce.” It is succulent, has thick stem and tender leaves. The plant grows to a height of 10 to 12 inches and has leaves at the end, similar to that of lettuce. Its skin tastes bitter, and hence is removed by paring it and leaving only the green core of it which is soft and translucent.

Prickly lettuce or China lettuce (Lactuca serriola) is also a variety grown in waste lands along roadsides, yards and gardens. It is an irrigated crop that is suited to grow on light or dry soils.

In Taiwan, head lettuce is an export crop (40–50% of produce exported) grown in the sub-tropical mountainous area, which is suitable (due to its cool climate) for its cultivation. This crop is a good source of vitamin A and folic acid. It is green in colour and has crisp leaves and is of the compact variety. Though low in calories it is a vitamin and mineral supplement. Stem lettuce provides vitamin C and also calcium.

== Culinary dishes ==
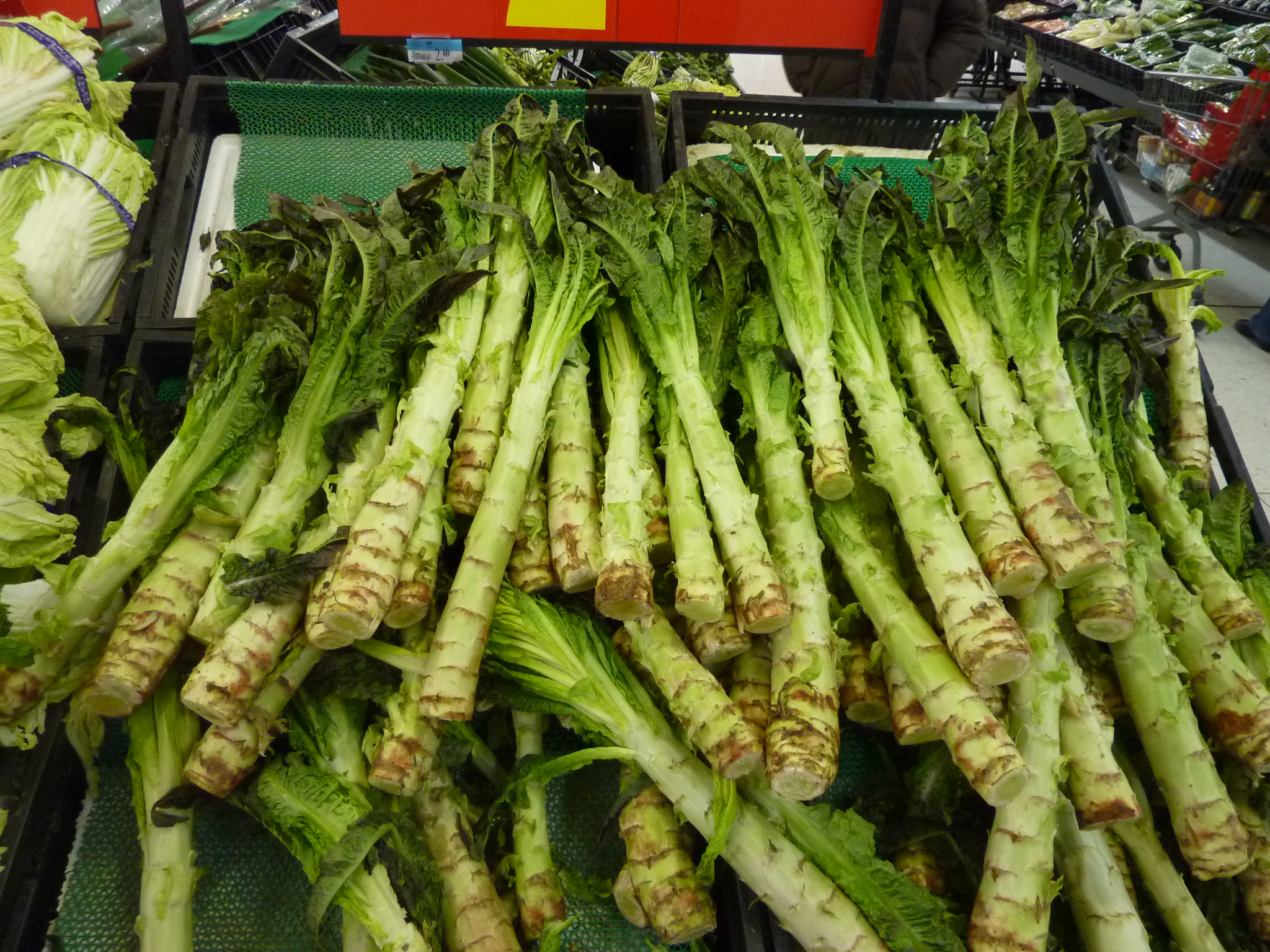
Woju (莴苣), a lettuce variety grown for its stem used in Chinese cooking, sold in a Yangzhou supermarket

In China, lettuce is not eaten in a raw form of salad. The preferred common usage is in plain form as stir-fried (cooked for a short time) and occasionally mixed with mushroom and other vegetables, and well spiced with garnishing. It is also steamed individually. It is also used in combination with meat dishes such as “Sliced Pork Stir Fried with Lettuce.” Lettuce soups are also common, along with fish or minced chicken. For this preparation, fresh and crisp lettuce is chosen and the soup is consumed hot and not allowed to go tasteless. Other varieties of dishes are “Lettuce and fermented Bean Cake” and “Clear Simmered Bean Card with Lettuce and Cellophane Noodles.” Stem lettuce, which originated in China, is cooked and used as a food item.

== Culture ==
It is common belief in China that lettuce is a symbol for wealth and good luck. It is a festive food during birthdays, New Year's Day and several other festive occasions. Celtuce is pickled and used as a side dish during meals.

== Gallery ==
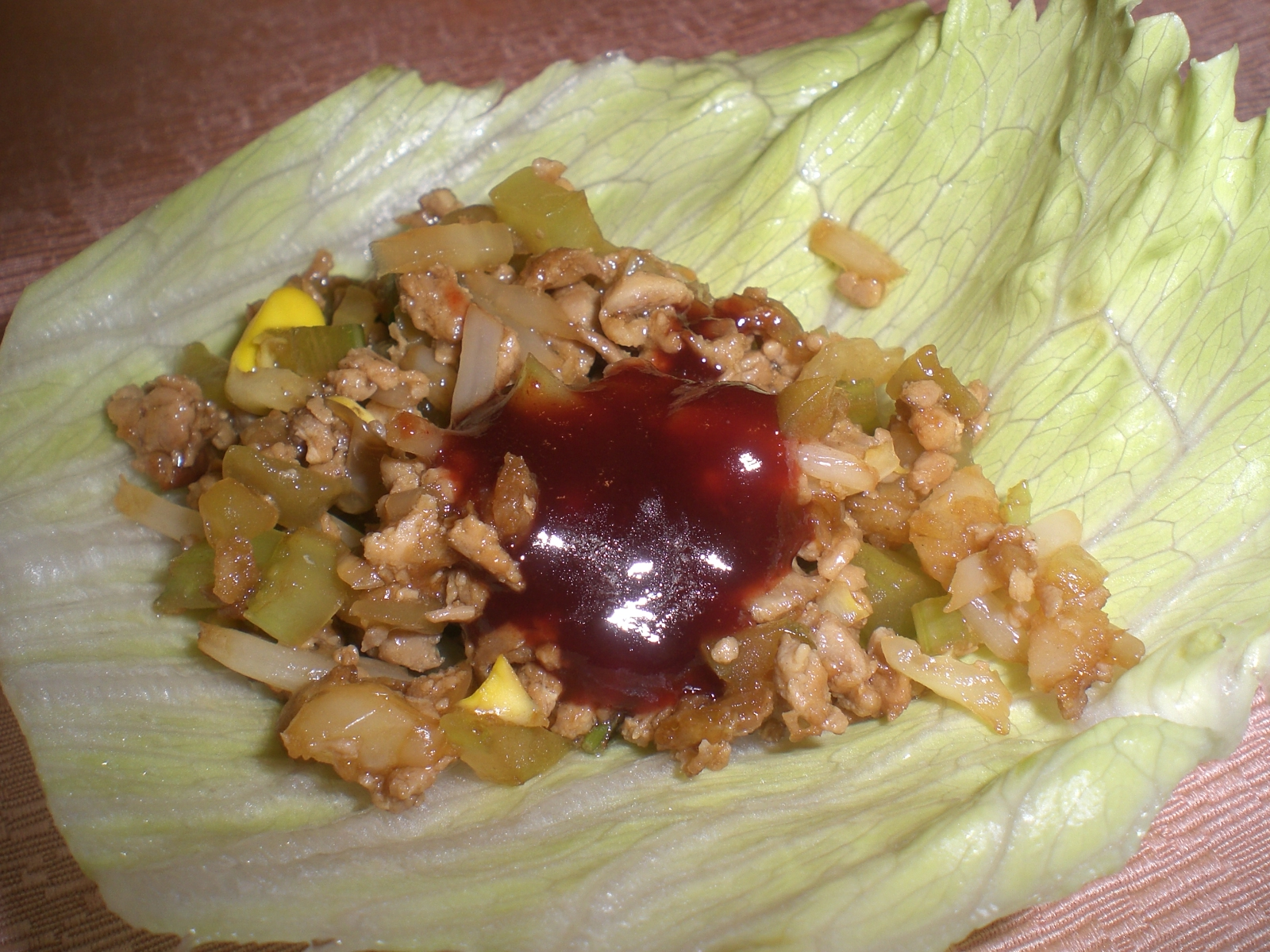
Meal served on lettuce in Hong Kong.
