= Lichen product =

Secondary metabolite made by a lichen

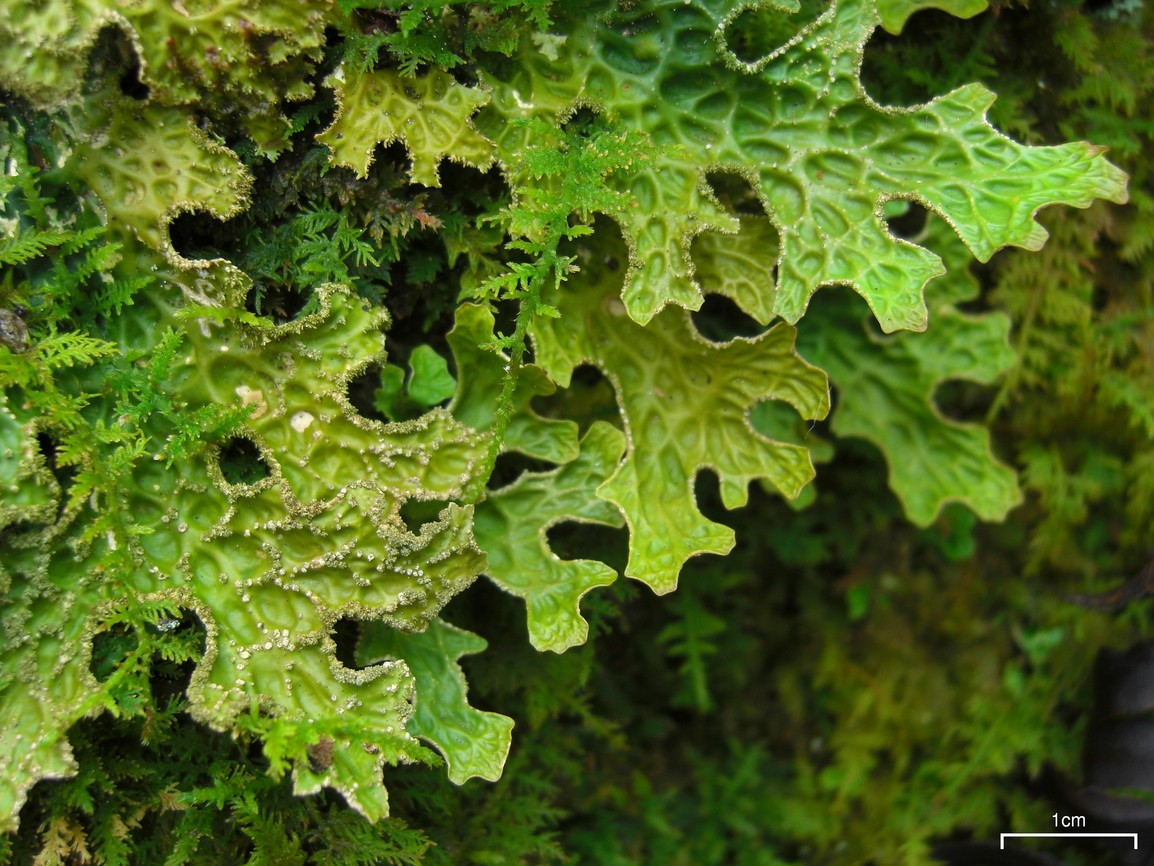
Lobaria pulmonaria, a lichen that contains lichen products such as stictic acid and gyrophoric acid.

Lichen products, also known as lichen substances, are organic compounds produced by a lichen. Specifically, they are secondary metabolites. Lichen products are represented in several different chemical classes, including terpenoids, orcinol derivatives, chromones, xanthones, depsides, and depsidones. Over 1000 lichen products of known chemical structure have been reported in the scientific literature, and most of these compounds are exclusively found in lichens. Examples of lichen products include usnic acid (a dibenzofuran), atranorin (a depside), lichexanthone (a xanthone), salazinic acid (a depsidone), and isolichenan, an α-glucan. Many lichen products have biological activity, and research into these effects is ongoing.

== Biosynthesis ==
Most lichen products are biochemically synthesized via the acetyl-polymalonyl pathway (also known as polyketide pathway), while only a few originate from the mevalonate and shikimate biosynthetic pathways.

In fungi, the genes needed to build a secondary metabolite are often grouped together in the genome as biosynthetic gene clusters. Using gene-cluster counts as a proxy for chemical potential, a comparative study of hundreds of ascomycete genomes found that lichen-forming fungi tend to carry more biosynthetic clusters than non-lichenized relatives, largely because they have more polyketide synthase clusters (the machinery behind many familiar lichen products).

== Occurrence ==
Lichen products accumulate on the outer walls of the fungal hyphae, and are quite stable. Crystal deposits can be visualised using scanning electron microscopy. For this reason, even very old herbarium specimens can be analysed. The amount of lichen products in lichen (as a percentage of dry weight) is typically between 0.1%–10%, although in some instances it may be as high as 30%. They are usually found in the medulla, or less commonly, the cortex.

In 1907, Wilhelm Zopf identified and classified about 150 lichen products. Seventy years later, this number had risen to 300, and by 1995, 850 lichen products were known; as of 2021, more than 1000 have been identified. Analytical methods were developed in the 1970s using thin-layer chromatography for the routine identification of lichen products. More recently, published techniques demonstrate ways to more efficiently harvest secondary metabolites from lichen samples.

Chemical isolate	Lichen source	Researched activity and uses
Atranorin	Cetraria islandica	Analgesic, anti-inflammatory, antimicrobial
Constipatic acid	Xanthoparmelia	
Lichexanthone	Hypotrachyna osseoalba	
Portentol	Roccella portentosa	Anticancer
Salazinic acid	Parmotrema, Bulbothrix	Antibacterial
Usnic acid	Usnea	Antibacterial, adrenergic activity

== Detection and analysis ==
Many lichen products can be screened with simple chemical tests long used in lichen identification. In spot tests, a small amount of reagent is applied directly to the thallus (or to a particular layer, such as the outer cortex or inner medulla) and any colour change is recorded. Because different compounds tend to give consistent reactions, these tests can help separate morphologically similar taxa or chemotypes, and the results are often recorded for herbarium specimens as part of routine work. Spot tests are only a first pass, though: colour intensity can be hard to standardize, and a given reaction does not always point to a single compound. For a more informative profile, many workers still use thin-layer chromatography, which separates metabolites from a solvent extract on a coated plate and produces a characteristic pattern of spots that can be compared with standardized protocols.

Laboratory identification usually combines chromatography with spectroscopic methods. High-performance liquid chromatography (HPLC) is widely used to separate and help identify lichen substances, particularly those that are too non-volatile or heat-sensitive for gas chromatography; gradient methods can improve separation in complex extracts. Modern workflows increasingly use "hyphenated" approaches, coupling chromatographic separation with detectors such as UV–visible or infrared spectroscopy, mass spectrometry, and NMR spectroscopy. This can speed up dereplication (recognizing common, previously described compounds early) and focus effort on unusual or bioactive products. Complementing extract-based work, in situ techniques apply spectroscopy or mass spectrometry directly to intact thalli or thin sections, reducing artefacts from extraction and allowing researchers to map where metabolites accumulate within the lichen, including cases where concentrations differ between vegetative tissues and reproductive structures.

== Use in taxonomy ==
Lichen products play a crucial role in differentiating lichenised fungi, particularly in groups where morphological characteristics are less distinct. This approach is notably applied in the genus Lepraria, which lacks sexual reproduction and ascomata (fruiting bodies), typically key features for species identification. Similarly, in genera with more complex structures like the crustose genus Ochrolechia, and the fruticose Cladonia, the presence, absence, or substitution of specific lichen products is frequently used to distinguish species, especially when these variations align with differences in geographical distribution.
