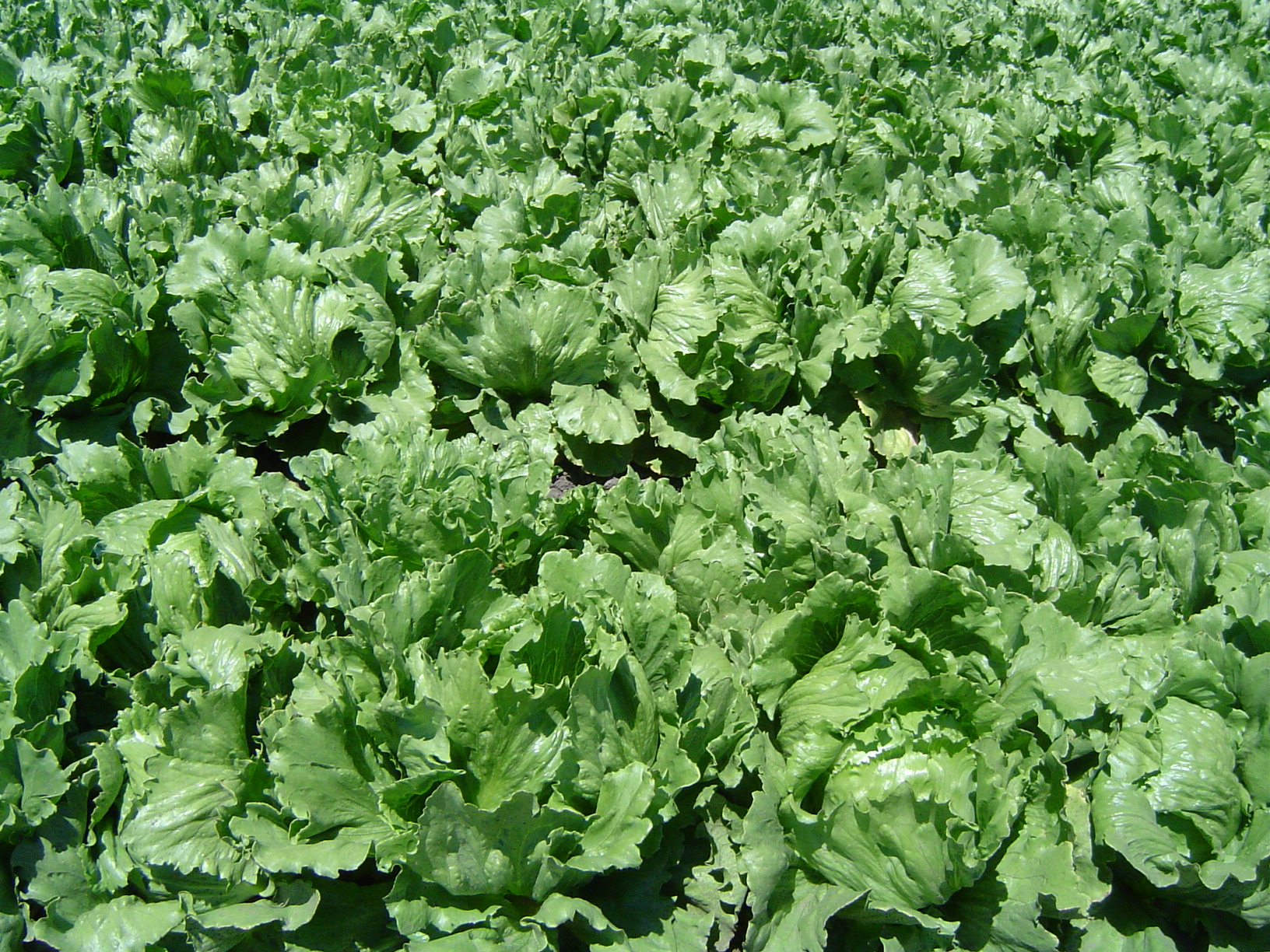
- A field of iceberg lettuces in California

Scientific classification
- Kingdom: Plantae
- Clade: Tracheophytes
- Clade: Angiosperms
- Clade: Eudicots
- Clade: Asterids
- Order: Asterales
- Family: Asteraceae
- Genus: Lactuca
- Species: L. sativa

Binomial name
- Lactuca sativa L.

Synonyms
- Lactusca scariola var. sativa (Moris); L. scariola var. integrata (Gren. and Godr.); L. scariola var. integrifolia (G.Beck)

= Lettuce =

Leaf vegetable

Lettuce (Lactuca sativa) is an annual plant of the family Asteraceae mostly grown as a leaf vegetable. The leaves are most often used raw in green salads, although lettuce is also seen in other kinds of food, such as sandwiches, wraps and soups; it can also be grilled. Its stem and seeds are sometimes used; celtuce (asparagus lettuce) is one variety grown for its stems, which are eaten either raw or cooked. In addition to its main use as a leafy green, it has also gathered religious and medicinal significance over centuries of human consumption. Europe and North America originally dominated the market for lettuce, but by the late 20th century the consumption of lettuce had spread throughout the world. In 2023, world production of lettuce (and chicory) was 28 million tonnes, led by China with 53% of the total.

Lettuce was originally farmed by the ancient Egyptians, who transformed it from a plant whose seeds were used to obtain oil into an important food crop raised for its succulent leaves and oil-rich seeds. Lettuce spread to the Greeks and Romans; the latter gave it the name lactuca, from which the English lettuce is derived. By 50 AD, many types were described, and lettuce appeared often in medieval writings, including several herbals. The 16th through 18th centuries saw the development of many varieties in Europe, and by the mid-18th century, cultivars were described that can still be found in modern gardens.

Generally grown as a hardy annual, lettuce is easily cultivated, although it requires relatively low temperatures to prevent it from flowering quickly. It can be plagued by numerous nutrient deficiencies, as well as insect and mammal pests, and fungal and bacterial diseases. L. sativa crosses easily within the species and with some other species within the genus Lactuca. Although this trait can be a problem to home gardeners who attempt to save seeds, biologists have used it to broaden the gene pool of cultivated lettuce varieties.

Contaminated lettuce is often a source of bacterial, viral, and parasitic outbreaks in humans, including E. coli and Salmonella.

== Taxonomy and etymology ==
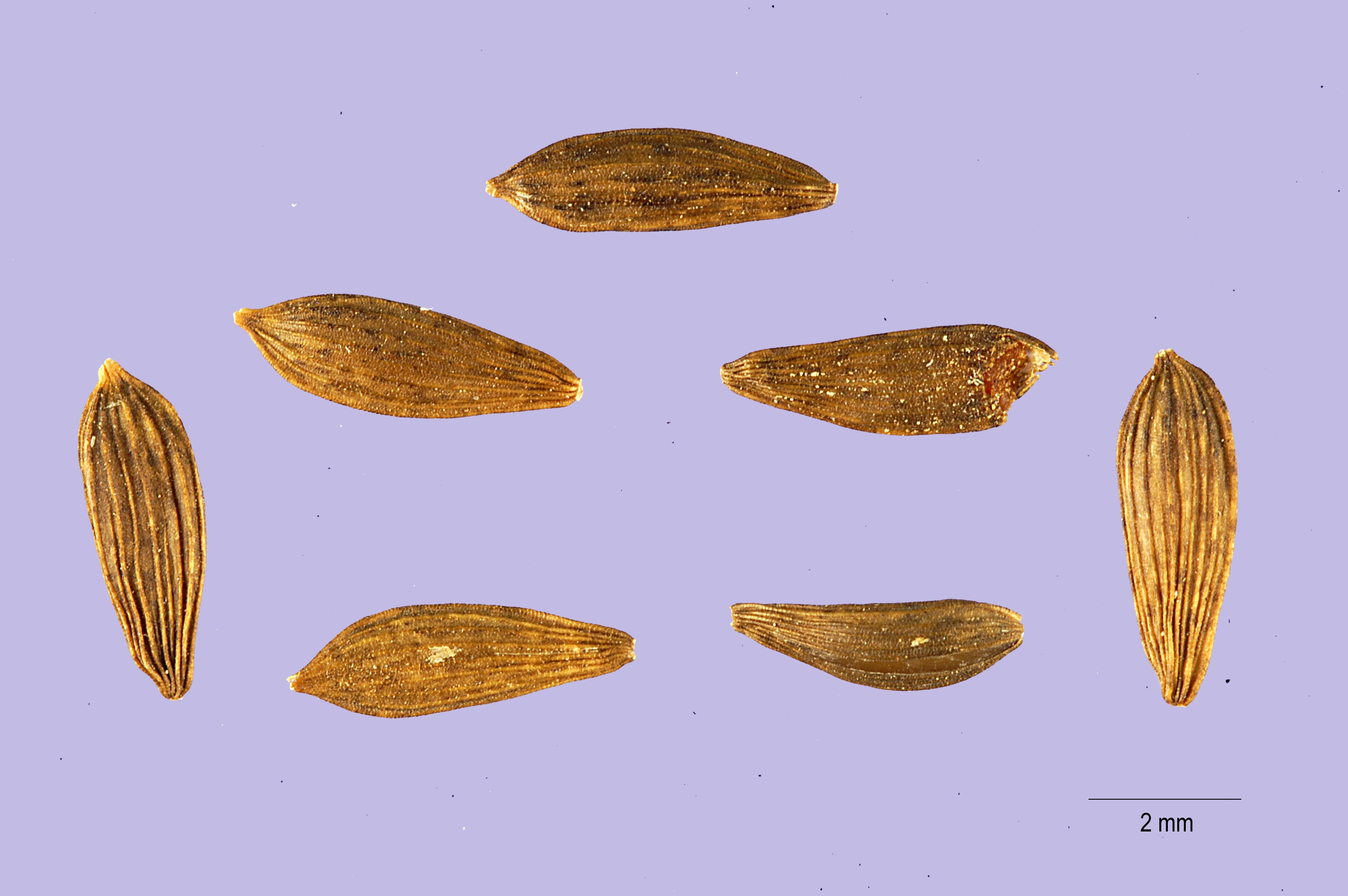
L. sativa seeds

Lactuca sativa is a member of the Lactuca (lettuce) genus and the Asteraceae (sunflower or aster) family. The species was first described in 1753 by Carl Linnaeus in the second volume of his Species Plantarum. Synonyms for L. sativa include Lactuca scariola var. sativa, L. scariola var. integrata and L. scariola var. integrifolia. L. scariola is itself a synonym for L. serriola, the common wild or prickly lettuce. L. sativa also has many identified taxonomic groups, subspecies and varieties, which delineate the various cultivar groups of domesticated lettuce. Lettuce is closely related to several Lactuca species from southwest Asia; the closest relationship is to L. serriola, an aggressive weed common in temperate and subtropical zones in much of the world.

The Romans referred to lettuce as lactuca (lac meaning "milk" in Latin), an allusion to the white substance, latex, exuded by cut stems. The name Lactuca has become the genus name, while sativa (meaning "sown" or "cultivated") was added to create the species name. The current word lettuce, originally from Middle English, came from the Old French letues or laitues, which derived from the Roman name. The name romaine came from the variety of lettuce grown in the Roman papal gardens, while cos, another term for romaine lettuce, came from the earliest European seeds of the type from the Greek island of Kos, a center of lettuce farming in the Byzantine period.

== Description ==
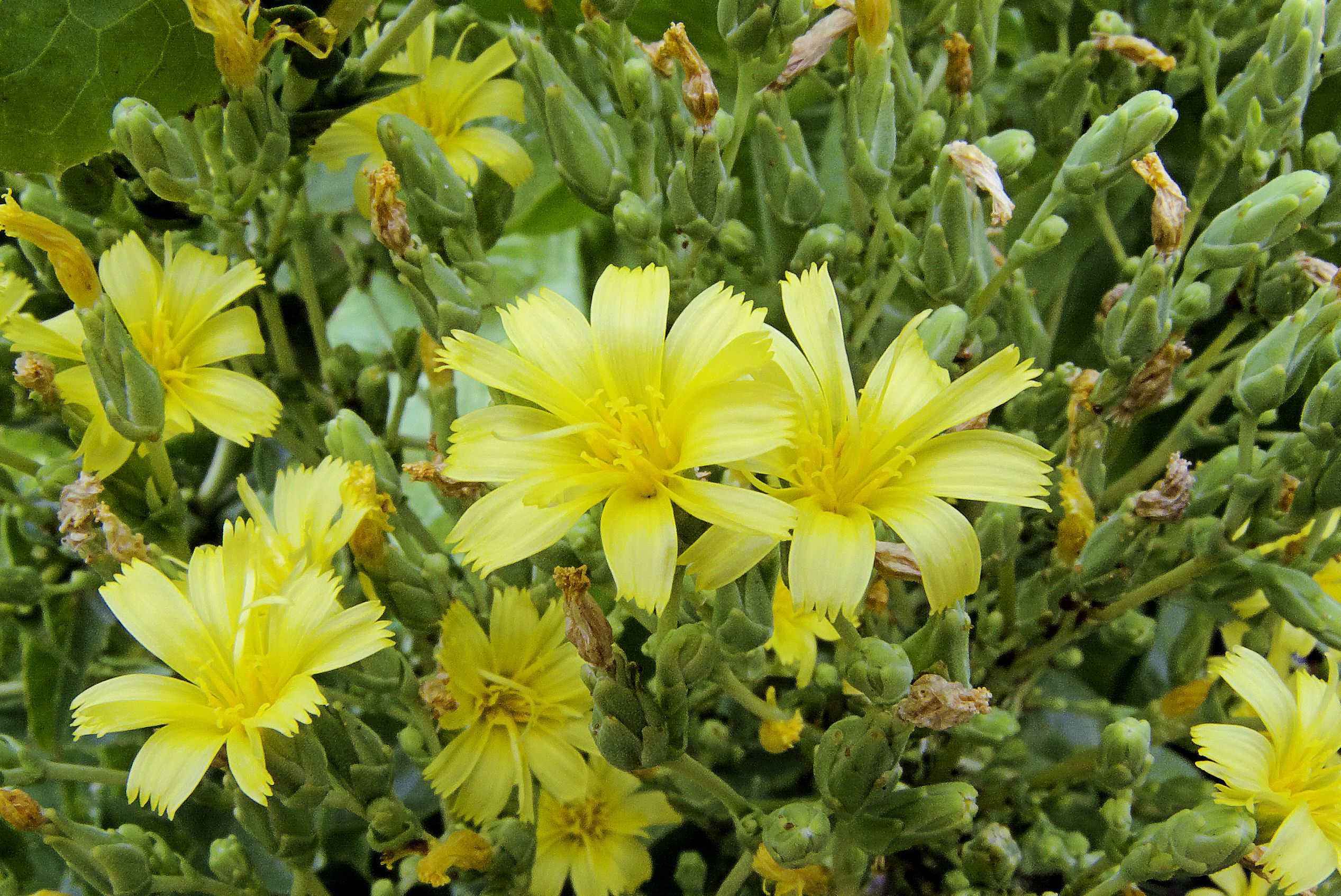
Lettuce inflorescences

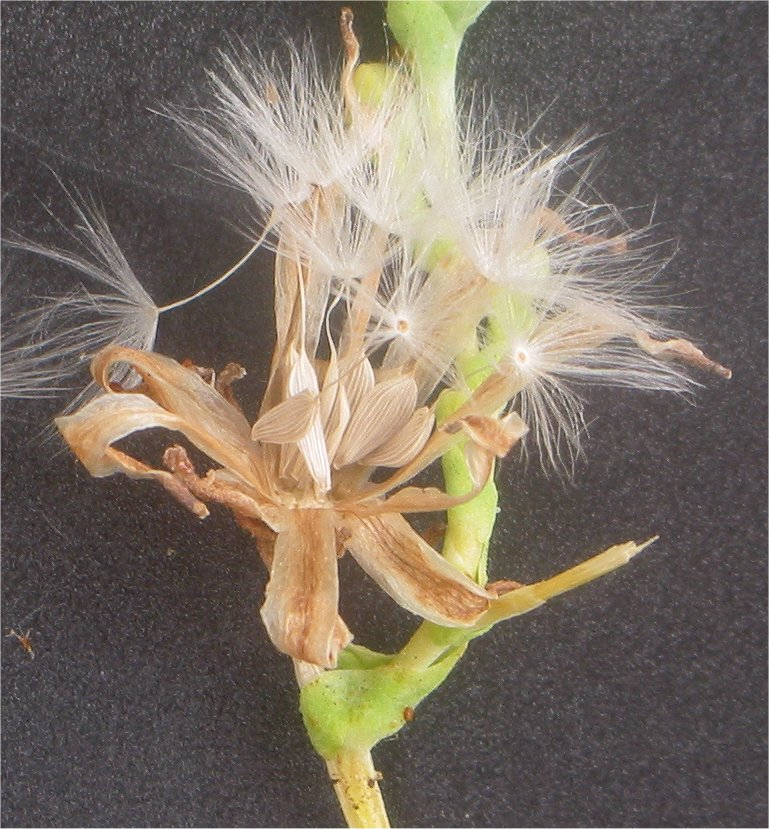
Mature lettuce inflorescence in fruit

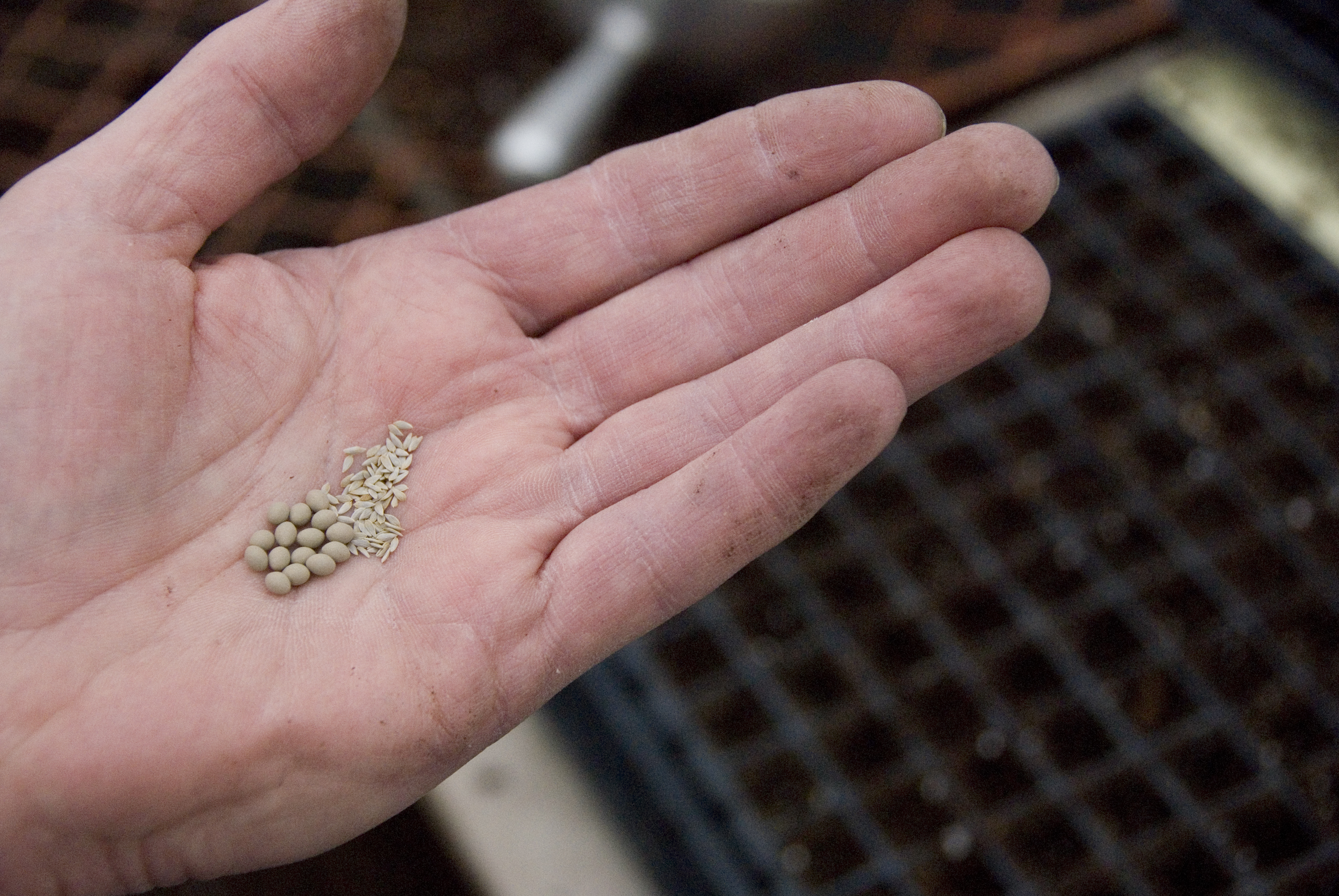
Lettuce seeds - raw on the right and pelleted with clay on the left; pellets make the seeds easier to handle for planting

Lettuce's native range spreads from the Mediterranean to Siberia, although it has been transported to almost all areas of the world. Plants generally have a height and spread of 15 to 30 cm (6 to 12 in). The leaves are colorful, mainly in the green and red color spectrums, with some variegated varieties. There are also a few varieties with yellow, gold or blue-teal leaves.

Lettuces have a wide range of shapes and textures, from the dense heads of the iceberg type to the notched, scalloped, frilly or ruffly leaves of leaf varieties. Lettuce plants have a root system that includes a main taproot and smaller secondary roots. Some varieties, especially those found in the United States and Western Europe, have long, narrow taproots and a small set of secondary roots. Longer taproots and more extensive secondary systems are found in varieties from Asia.

Depending on the variety and time of year, lettuce generally lives 65–130 days from planting to harvesting. Because lettuce that flowers (through the process known as "bolting") becomes bitter and unsaleable, plants grown for consumption are rarely allowed to grow to maturity. Lettuce flowers more quickly in hot temperatures, while freezing temperatures cause slower growth and sometimes damage to outer leaves.

Once plants move past the edible stage, they develop flower stalks up to 1 m (3 ft 3 in) high with small yellow blossoms. Like other members of the tribe Cichorieae, lettuce inflorescences (also known as flower heads or capitula) are composed of multiple florets, each with a modified calyx called a pappus (which becomes the feathery "parachute" of the fruit), a corolla of five petals fused into a ligule or strap, and the reproductive parts. These include fused anthers that form a tube which surrounds a style and bipartite stigma. As the anthers shed pollen, the style elongates to allow the stigmas, now coated with pollen, to emerge from the tube. The ovaries form compressed, obovate (teardrop-shaped) dry fruits that do not open at maturity, measuring 3 to 4 mm long. The fruits have 5–7 ribs on each side and are tipped by two rows of small white hairs. The pappus remains at the top of each fruit as a dispersal structure. Each fruit contains one seed, which can be white, yellow, gray or brown depending on the variety of lettuce.

The domestication of lettuce over the centuries has resulted in several changes through selective breeding: delayed bolting, larger seeds, larger leaves and heads, better taste and texture, a lower latex content, and different leaf shapes and colors. Work in these areas continues through the present day. Scientific research into the genetic modification of lettuce is ongoing, with over 85 field trials taking place between 1992 and 2005 in the European Union and the United States to test modifications allowing greater herbicide tolerance, greater resistance to insects and fungi and slower bolting patterns. However, genetically modified lettuce is not currently used in commercial agriculture.

== History ==
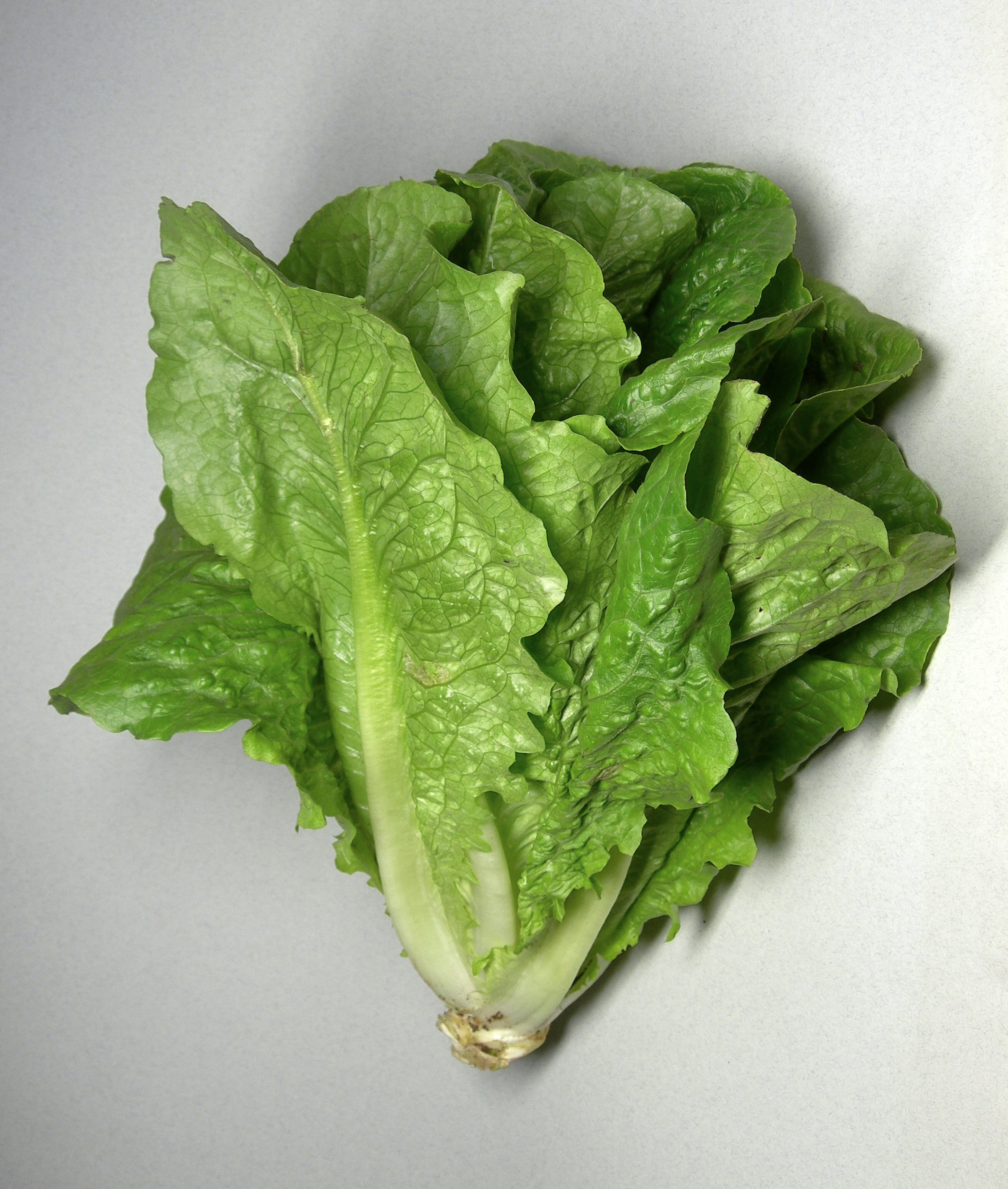
Romaine lettuce, a descendant of some of the earliest cultivated lettuce

DNA analysis of 445 types of lettuce indicates that lettuce was first domesticated from its wild ancestor near the Caucasus, where seed shattering was first selected out of the cultivar. At the time, the lettuce plant was only suitable for harvesting its seeds, which could be pressed to extract oil, likely used for cooking among other purposes. From there, lettuce was likely spread to the Near East and then to ancient Egypt, where the first depictions of lettuce cultivation can be found as early as 2680 BC. Like the early lettuce from the Caucasus, this lettuce was grown to produce cooking oil from its seeds.

Lettuce was considered a sacred plant of the reproduction god Min and was carried during his festivals and placed near his images. The plant was thought to help the god "perform the sexual act untiringly". Its use in religious ceremonies resulted in the creation of many images in tombs and wall paintings. The cultivated variety appears to have been about 75 cm (30 in) tall and resembled a large version of the modern romaine lettuce. These upright lettuces were developed by the Egyptians and passed to the Greeks who in turn shared them with the Romans. Around 50 AD, Roman agriculturalist Columella described several lettuce varieties – some of which may have been ancestors of today's lettuces.

The plant was eventually selectively bred into a plant grown for its edible leaves. The long leaves in Egyptian depictions suggest that it may have been grown for its leaves, which would make it the first lettuce cultivar grown for this purpose. However, genome wide analysis suggests the traits needed for cultivation as a leafy vegetable, like the loss of bitterness and thorns, evolved much later, from around 500 BC in Southern Europe. Lettuce cultivars radiated more rapidly from this point with oilseed lettuce likely being brought by the ancient Greeks from Egypt to Italy where it was modified into cos lettuce and cultivated for its leaves. From there, it was brought north to Central Europe where it was modified into butterhead lettuce and other varieties. Lettuce started to be cultivated in China around the fifth or seventh century CE, although it is unclear how it arrived there.

Lettuce appears in many medieval writings, especially as a medicinal herb. Hildegard of Bingen mentioned it in her writings on medicinal herbs between 1098 and 1179, and many early herbals also describe its uses. In 1586, Joachim Camerarius provided descriptions of the three basic modern lettuces – head lettuce, loose-leaf lettuce, and romaine (or cos) lettuce. Lettuce was first brought to the Americas from Europe by Christopher Columbus in the late 15th century. Between the late 16th century and the early 18th century, many varieties were developed in Europe, particularly Holland. Books published in the mid-18th and early 19th centuries describe several varieties found in gardens today.

Due to its short lifespan after harvest, lettuce was originally sold relatively close to where it was grown. The early 20th century saw the development of new packing, storage and shipping technologies that improved the lifespan and transportability of lettuce and resulted in a significant increase in availability. During the 1950s, lettuce production was revolutionized with the development of vacuum cooling, which allowed field cooling and packing of lettuce, replacing the previously used method of ice-cooling in packing houses outside the fields.

Lettuce is easy to grow, and as such has been a significant source of sales for many seed companies. Tracing the history of many varieties is complicated by the practice of many companies, particularly in the US, of changing a variety's name from year to year. This practice is conducted for several reasons, the most prominent being to boost sales by promoting a "new" variety, or to prevent customers from knowing that the variety had been developed by a competing seed company. Documentation from the late 19th century shows between 65 and 140 distinct varieties of lettuce, depending on the amount of variation allowed between types – a distinct difference from the 1,100 named lettuce varieties on the market at the time. Names also often changed significantly from country to country. Although most lettuce grown today is used as a vegetable, a minor amount is used in the production of tobacco-free cigarettes; however, domestic lettuce's wild relatives produce a leaf that visually more closely resembles tobacco.

== Cultivation ==
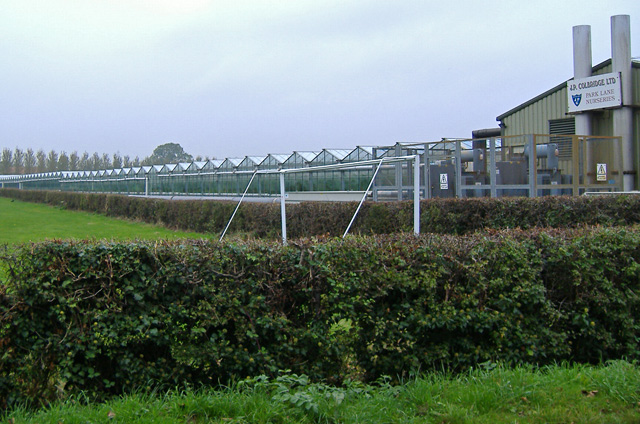
A lettuce farm in the United Kingdom

A hardy annual, some varieties of lettuce can be overwintered even in relatively cold climates under a layer of straw, and older, heirloom varieties are often grown in cold frames. Lettuces meant for the cutting of individual leaves are generally planted straight into the garden in thick rows. Heading varieties of lettuces are commonly started in flats, then transplanted to individual spots, usually 20 to 36 cm (7.9 to 14.2 in) apart, in the garden after developing several leaves. Lettuce spaced farther apart receives more sunlight, which improves color and nutrient quantities in the leaves. Pale to white lettuce, such as the centers in some iceberg lettuce, contain few nutrients.

Lettuce grows best in full sun in loose, nitrogen-rich soils with a pH of between 6.0 and 6.8. Heat generally prompts lettuce to bolt, with most varieties growing poorly above 24 °C (75 °F); cool temperatures prompt better performance, with 16 to 18 °C (61 to 64 °F) being preferred and as low as 7 °C (45 °F) being tolerated. Plants in hot areas that are provided partial shade during the hottest part of the day will bolt more slowly. Temperatures above 27 °C (81 °F) will generally result in poor or non-existent germination of lettuce seeds. After harvest, lettuce lasts the longest when kept at 0 °C (32 °F) and 96 percent humidity. The high water content of lettuce (94.9 percent) creates problems when attempting to preserve the plant – it cannot be successfully frozen, canned or dried and must be eaten fresh. In spite of its high water content, traditionally grown lettuce has a low water footprint, with 237 liters (52 imp gal; 63 U.S. gal) of water required for each kilogram of lettuce produced. Hydroponic growing methods can reduce this water consumption by nearly two orders of magnitude.

Lettuce varieties will cross with each other, making spacing of 1.5 to 6 m (60 to 240 in) between varieties necessary to prevent contamination when saving seeds. Lettuce will also cross with Lactuca serriola (wild lettuce), with the resulting seeds often producing a plant with tough, bitter leaves. Celtuce, a lettuce variety grown primarily in Asia for its stems, crosses easily with lettuces grown for their leaves. This propensity for crossing, however, has led to breeding programs using closely related species in Lactuca, such as L. serriola, L. saligna, and L. virosa, to broaden the available gene pool. Starting in the 1990s, such programs began to include more distantly related species such as L. tatarica.

Seeds keep best when stored in cool conditions, and, unless stored cryogenically, remain viable the longest when stored at −20 °C (−4 °F); they are relatively short lived in storage. At room temperature, lettuce seeds remain viable for only a few months. However, when newly harvested lettuce seed is stored cryogenically, this life increases to a half-life of 500 years for vaporized nitrogen and 3,400 years for liquid nitrogen; this advantage is lost if seeds are not frozen promptly after harvesting.

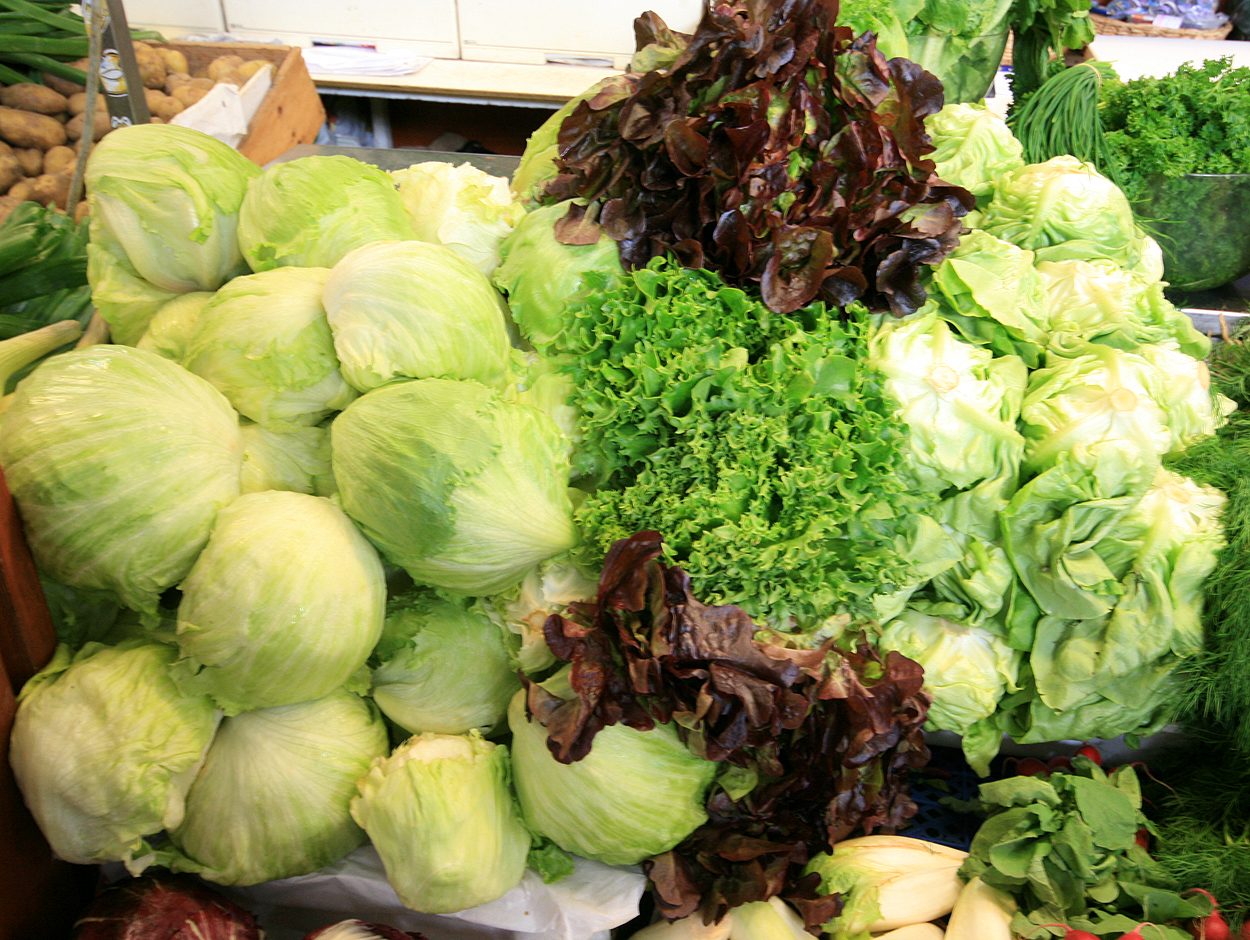
A selection of lettuce cultivars

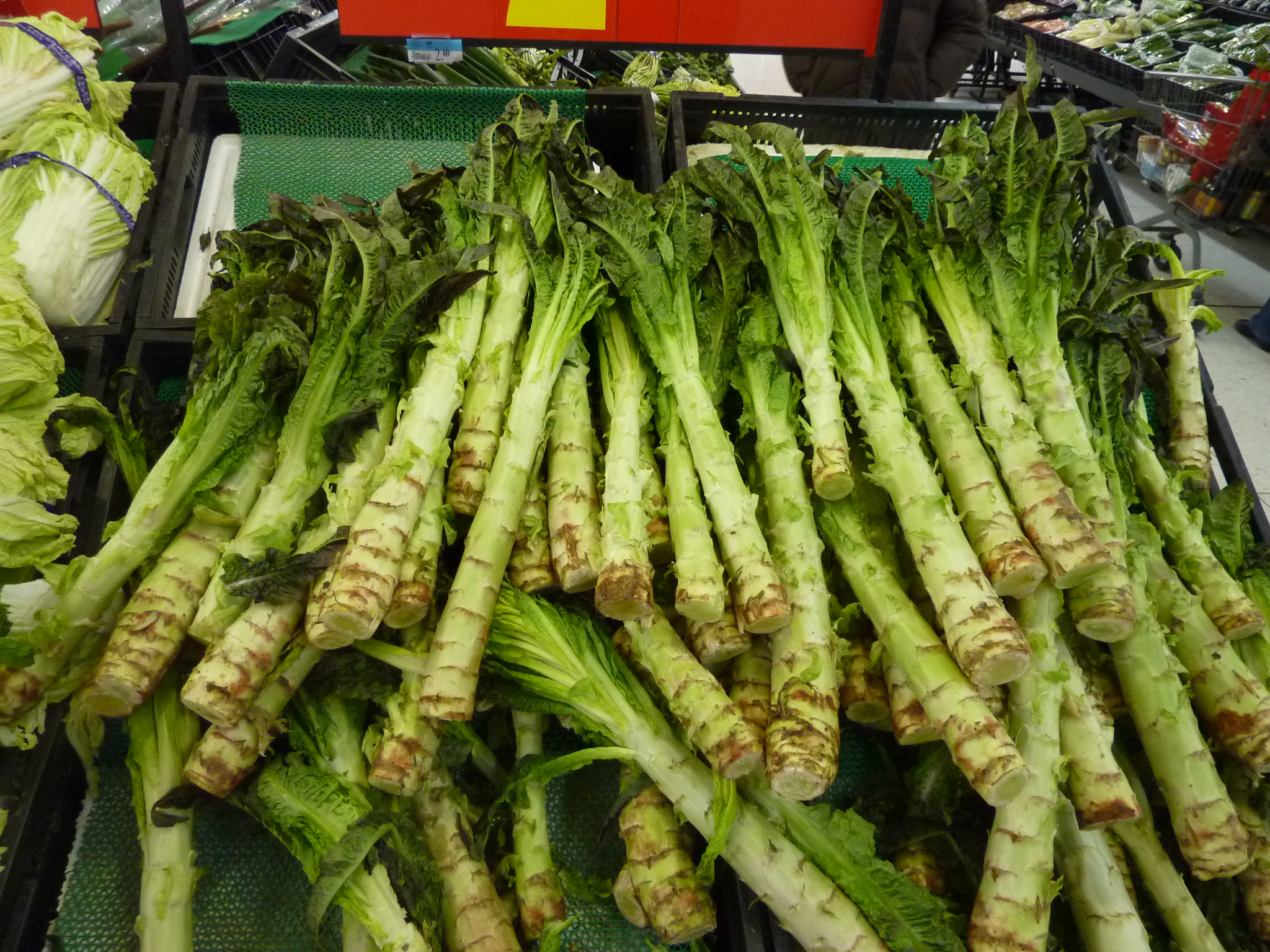
The lettuce variety celtuce is grown for its stem, used in Chinese cooking.

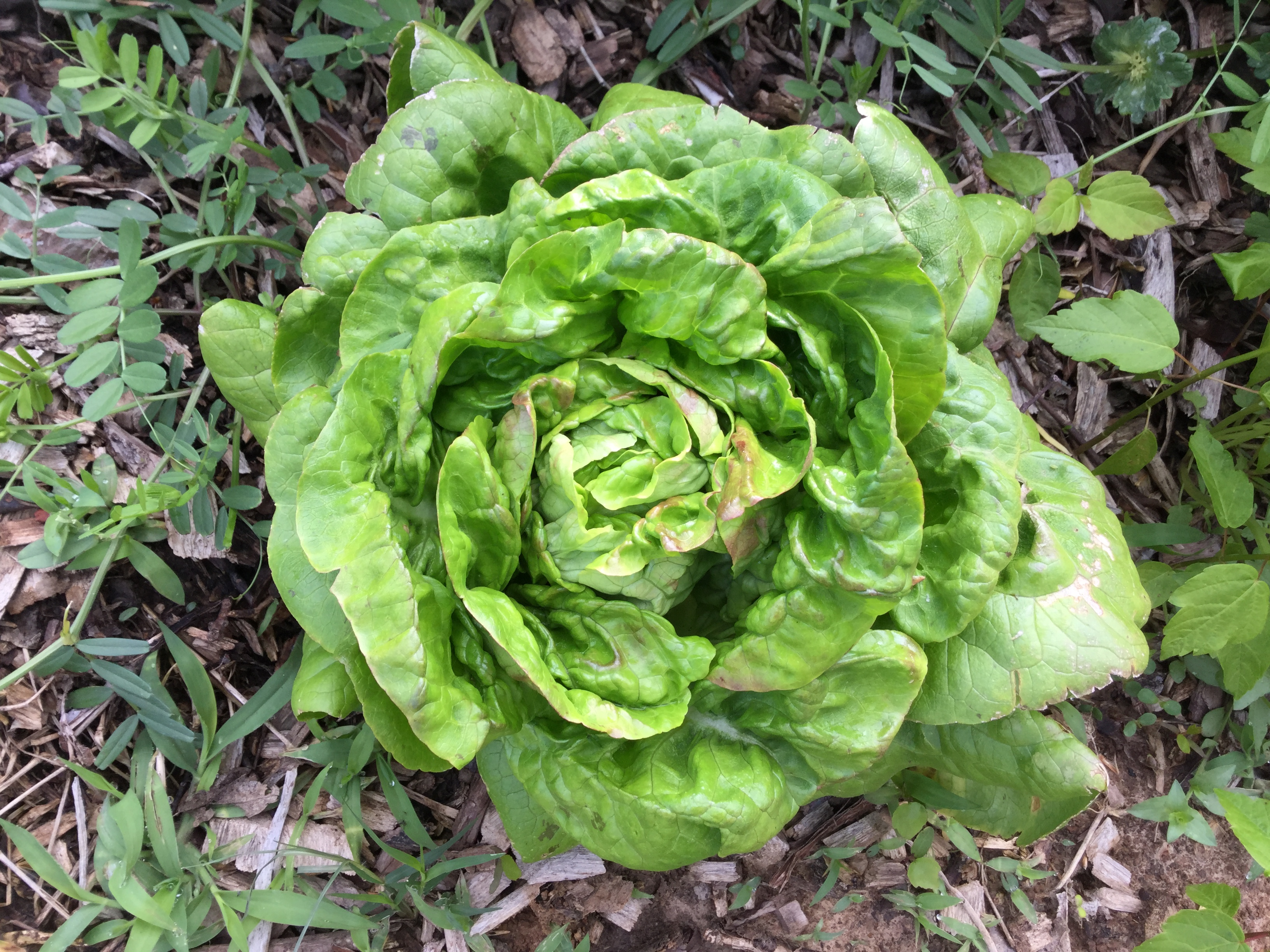
A butterhead lettuce

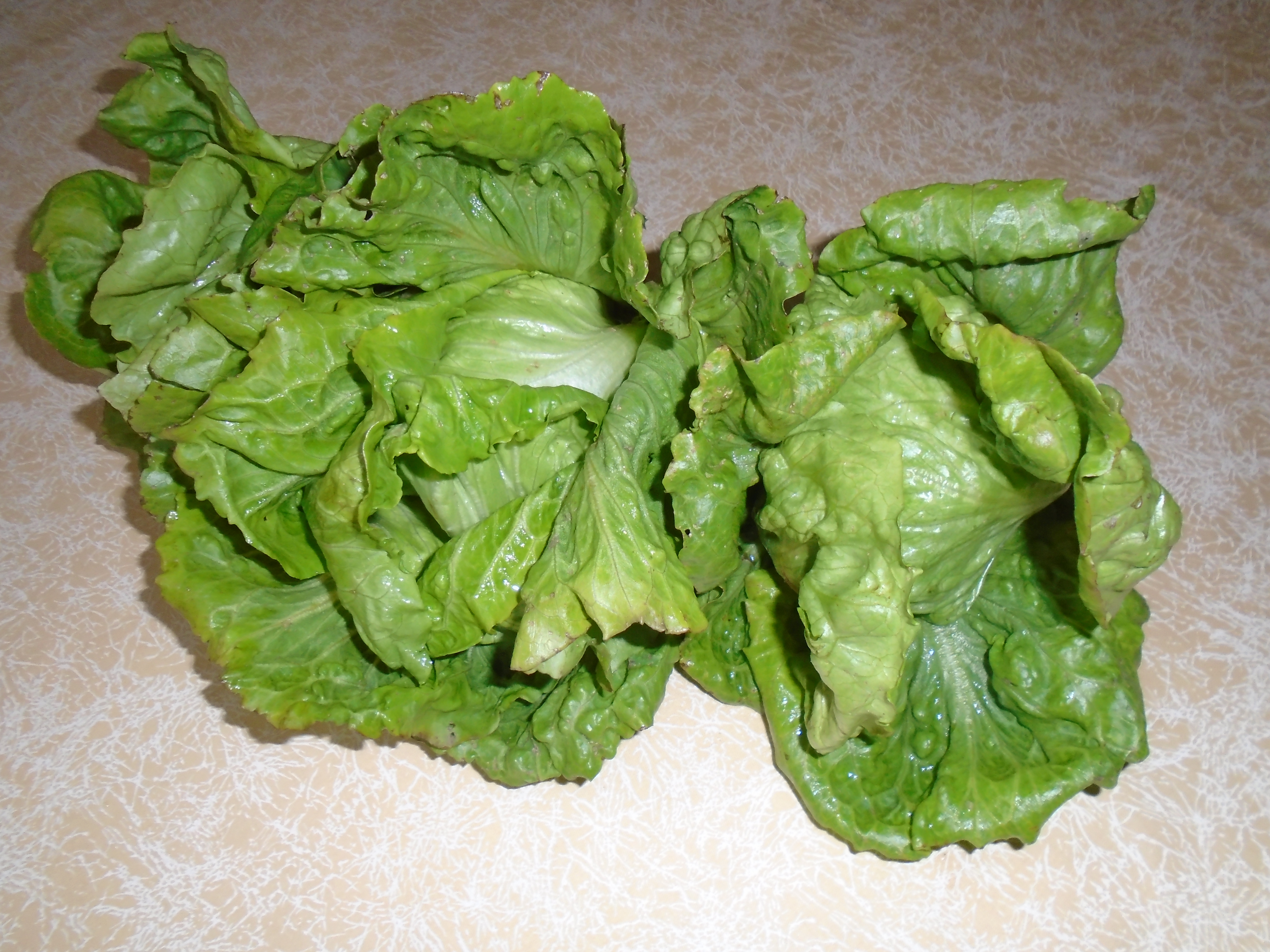
Prajzerica, a lettuce variety from Croatia

=== Varieties ===
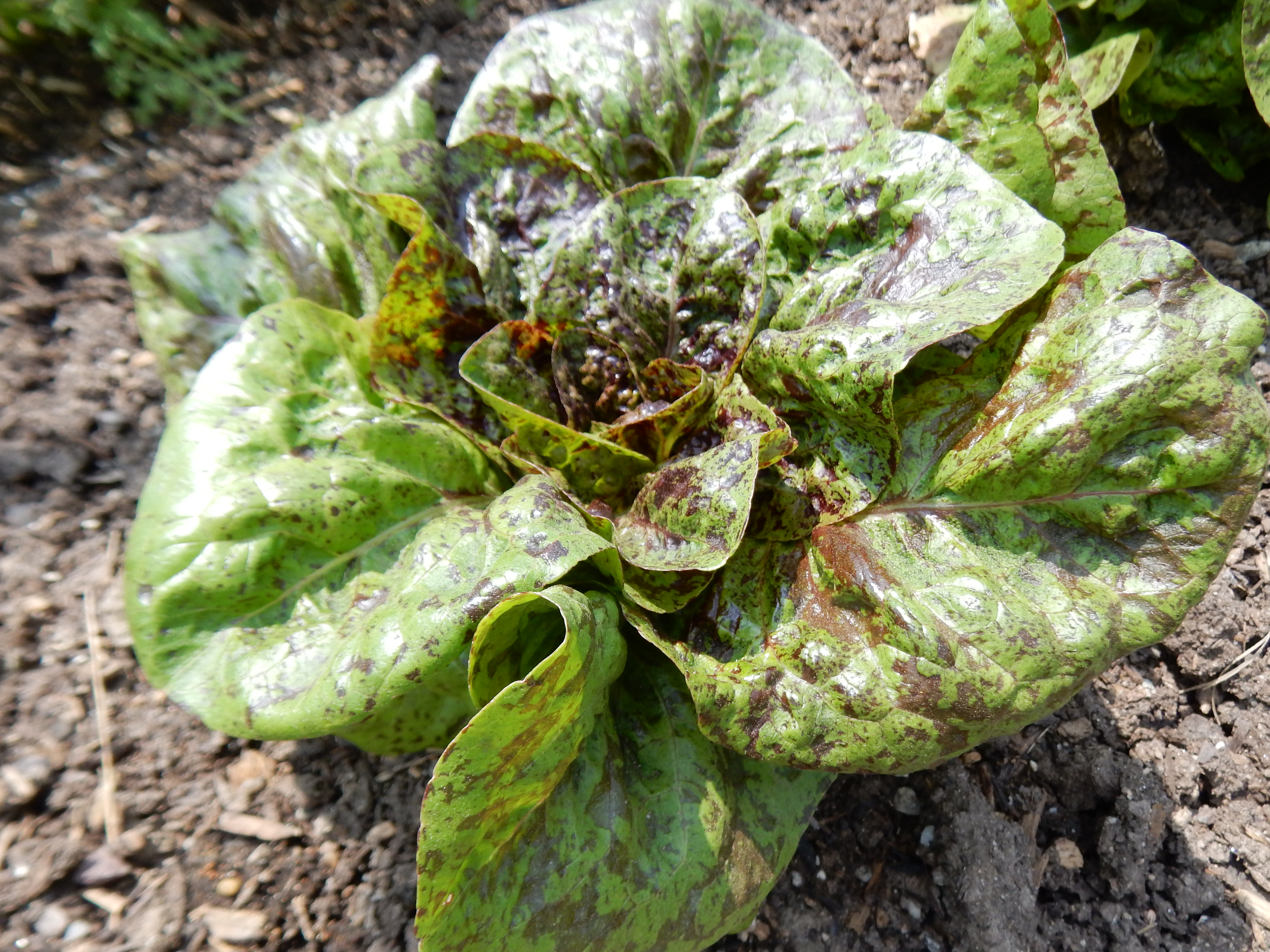
Romaine lettuce 'Forellenschluss' from Austria

There are several types and cultivars of lettuce. Categorization may sometimes refer to "leaf" versus "head", but there are seven main cultivar groups of lettuce, each including many varieties:

1. Leaf—Also known as looseleaf, cutting or bunching lettuce, this type has loosely bunched leaves and is the most widely planted. It is used mainly for salads.
  - Red leaf lettuce—A group of lettuce types with red leaves.
2. Romaine/Cos—Used mainly for salads and sandwiches, this type forms long, upright heads. This is the most often used lettuce in Caesar salads.
  - Little Gem—a dwarf, compact romaine lettuce, popular in the UK.
3. Iceberg/Crisphead—The most popular type in the United States. Iceberg lettuce is very heat-sensitive and was originally developed in 1894 for growth in the northern United States by Burpee Seeds and Plants. It gets its name from the way it was transported in crushed ice, where the heads of lettuce looked like icebergs. Today, it ships well, but is low in flavor and nutritional content, being composed of even more water than other lettuce types.
4. Butterhead—Also known as Boston or Bibb lettuce, and traditionally in the UK as "round lettuce", this type is a head lettuce with a loose arrangement of leaves, known for its sweet flavor and tender texture.
5. Summercrisp—Also called Batavian or French crisp, this lettuce is midway between the crisphead and leaf types. These lettuces tend to be larger, bolt-resistant and well-flavored.
6. Celtuce/Stem—This type is grown for its seedstalk, rather than its leaves, and is used in Asian cooking, primarily Chinese, as well as stewed and creamed dishes.
7. Oilseed—This type is grown for its seeds, which are pressed to extract an oil mainly used for cooking. It has few leaves, bolts quickly and produces seeds around 50 percent larger than other types of lettuce.

The four main types in the Western world have been looseleaf, romaine, crisphead, and butterhead, with the others being intermediary or more exotic. The butterhead and crisphead types are sometimes known together as "cabbage" lettuce, because their heads are shorter, flatter, and more cabbage-like than romaine lettuces.

=== Problems ===
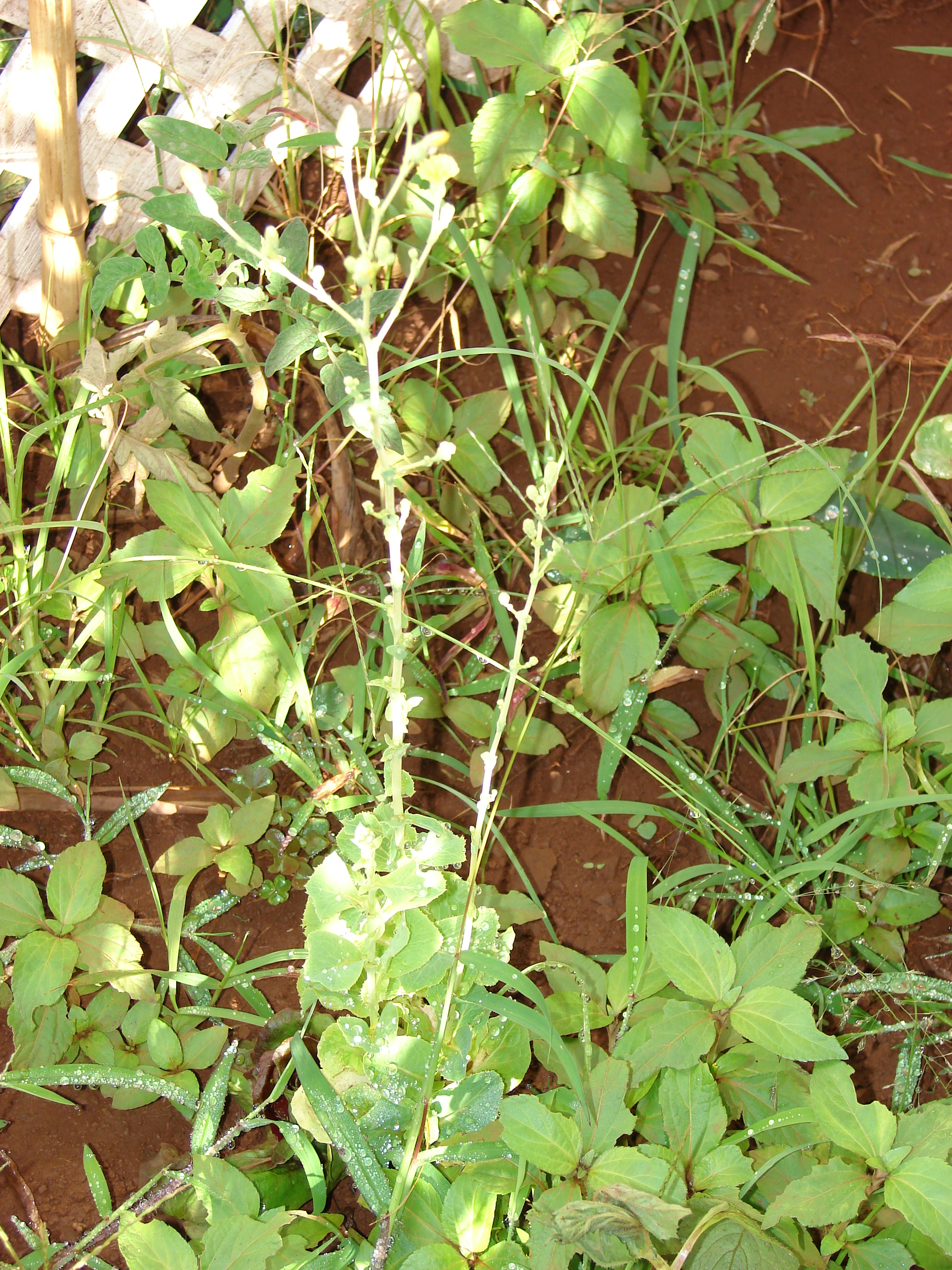
A lettuce surrounded by weeds, which have crowded it to the point of bolting

Soil nutrient deficiencies can cause a variety of plant problems that range from malformed plants to a lack of head growth. Many insects are attracted to lettuce, including cutworms, which cut seedlings off at the soil line; wireworms and nematodes, which cause yellow, stunted plants; tarnished plant bugs and aphids, which cause yellow, distorted leaves; leafhoppers, which cause stunted growth and pale leaves; thrips, which turn leaves gray-green or silver; leafminers, which create tunnels within the leaves; flea beetles, which cut small holes in leaves and caterpillars, slugs and snails, which cut large holes in leaves. For example, the larvae of the ghost moth and Delia platura is a common pest of lettuce plants. Mammals, including rabbits and groundhogs, also eat the plants. Lettuce contains several defensive compounds, including sesquiterpene lactones, and other natural phenolics such as flavonol and glycosides, which help to protect it against pests. Certain varieties contain more than others, and some selective breeding and genetic modification studies have focused on using this trait to identify and produce commercial varieties with increased pest resistance.

Lettuce also suffers from several viral diseases, including big vein, which causes yellow, distorted leaves, and mosaic virus, which is spread by aphids and causes stunted plant growth and deformed leaves. Aster yellows are a disease-causing bacteria carried by leafhoppers, which causes deformed leaves. Fungal diseases include powdery mildew and downy mildew, which cause leaves to mold and die and bottom rot, lettuce drop and gray mold, which cause entire plants to rot and collapse. Gray mold, Botrytis cinerea, may be treated with UV-C: Vàsquez et al. 2017 find that phenylalanine ammonia-lyase activity, phenolic production, and B. cinerea resistance are increased by UV-C. Crowding lettuce tends to attract pests and diseases. Weeds can also be an issue, as cultivated lettuce is generally not competitive with them, especially when directly seeded into the ground. Transplanted lettuce (started in flats and later moved to growing beds) is generally more competitive initially, but can still be crowded later in the season, causing misshapen lettuce and lower yields. Weeds also act as homes for insects and disease and can make harvesting more difficult. Herbicides are often used to control weeds in commercial production. However, this has led to the development of herbicide-resistant weeds in lettuce cultivation.

== Production ==
Lettuce production 2023, millions of tonnes
China	14.9
United States	4.7
India	1.2
Spain	0.9
World	28.1
Source: FAOSTAT of the United Nations

In 2023, world production of lettuce (report combined with chicory) was 28 million tonnes, with China alone accounting for 53% of the total (table).

Lettuce is the only member of the genus Lactuca to be grown commercially.

Lettuce yields

Production of lettuce

=== Markets ===
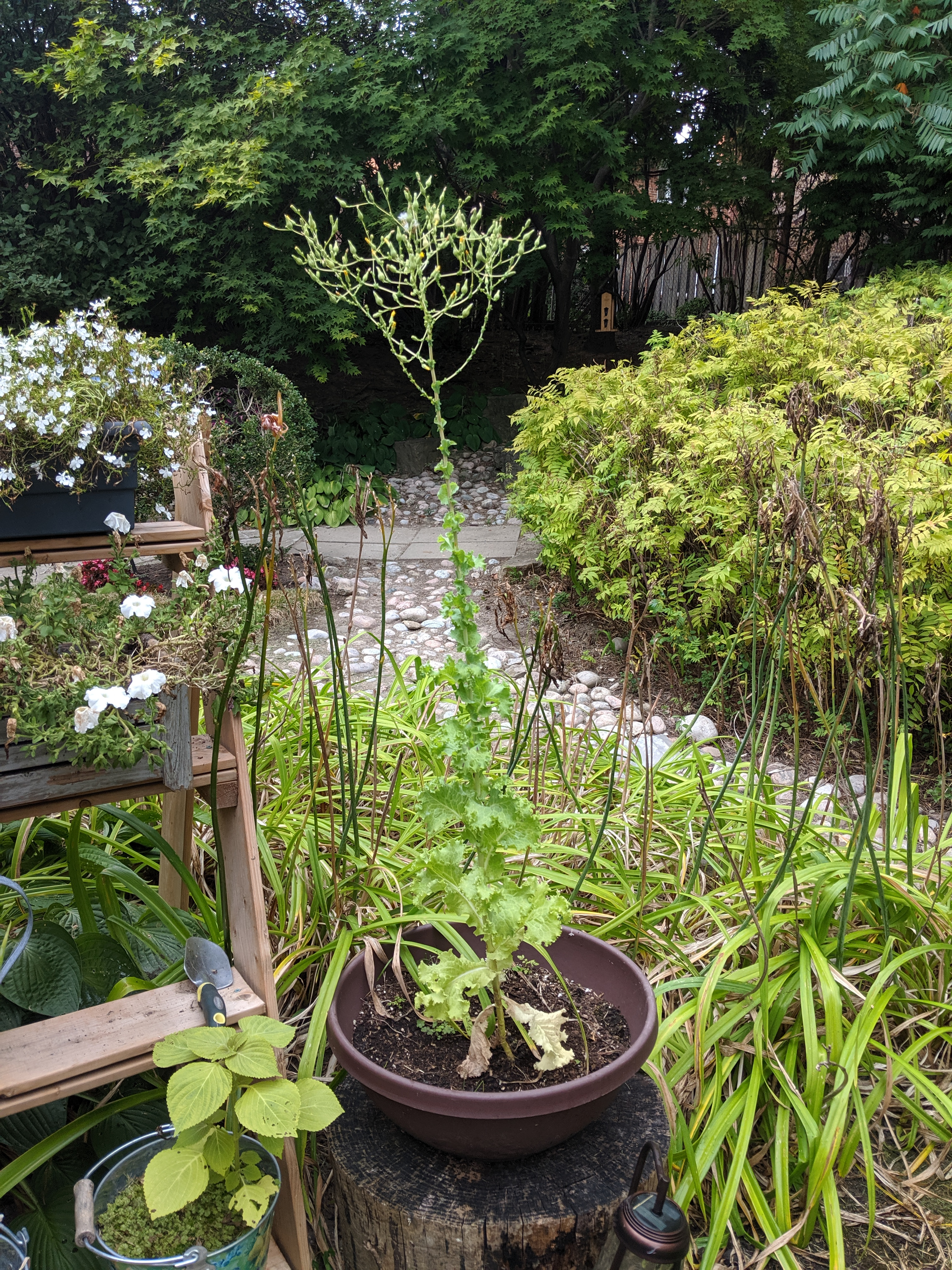
A lettuce plant that has bolted

Western Europe and North America were the original major markets for large-scale lettuce production. By the late 1900s, Asia, South America, Australia and Africa became more substantial markets. Different locations tended to prefer different types of lettuce, with butterhead prevailing in northern Europe and Great Britain, romaine in the Mediterranean and stem lettuce in China and Egypt. By the late 20th century, the preferred types began to change, with crisphead, especially iceberg, lettuce becoming the dominant type in northern Europe and Great Britain and more popular in western Europe. In the US, no one type predominated until the early 20th century, when crisphead lettuces began gaining popularity. After the 1940s, with the development of iceberg lettuce, 95 percent of the lettuce grown and consumed in the US was crisphead lettuce. By the end of the century, other types began to regain popularity and eventually made up over 30 percent of production. Stem lettuce was first developed in China, where it remains primarily cultivated.

In the early 21st century, bagged salad products increased in the lettuce market, especially in the US where innovative packaging and shipping methods prolonged freshness.

In the United States in 2022, lettuce was the main vegetable ingredient in salads, and was the most consumed among leaf vegetables; its market was about 20% of all vegetables, with Romaine and iceberg having about equal sales. Some 85% of the lettuce consumed in the United States in 2022 was produced domestically.

== Uses ==
=== Food ===
As described around 50 AD, lettuce leaves were often cooked and served by the Romans with an oil-and-vinegar dressing; however, smaller leaves were sometimes eaten raw. During the 81–96 AD reign of Domitian, the tradition of serving a lettuce salad before a meal began. Post-Roman Europe continued the tradition of poaching lettuce, mainly with large romaine types, as well as the method of pouring a hot oil and vinegar mixture over the leaves.

Today, the majority of lettuce is grown for its leaves, although one type is grown for its stem and one for its seeds, which are made into an oil. Most lettuce is used in salads, either alone or with other greens, vegetables, meats and cheeses. Romaine lettuce is often used for Caesar salads. Lettuce leaves can also be found in soups, sandwiches and wraps, while the stems are eaten both raw and cooked.

The consumption of lettuce in China developed differently from in Western countries, due to health risks and cultural aversion to eating raw leaves; Chinese "salads" are composed of cooked vegetables and are served hot or cold. Lettuce is also used in a larger variety of dishes than in Western countries, contributing to a range of dishes including bean curd and meat dishes, soups and stir-frys plain or with other vegetables. Stem lettuce, widely consumed in China, is eaten either raw or cooked, the latter primarily in soups and stir-frys. Lettuce is also used as a primary ingredient in the preparation of lettuce soup.

== Nutrition ==
Lettuce (iceberg, raw)
Nutritional value per 100 g (3.5 oz)
- Energy: 58 kJ (14 kcal)
- Carbohydrates: 3.0 g
- Sugars: 2.0 g
- Dietary fiber: 1.2 g
- Fat: 0.14 g
- Protein: 0.9 g
Vitamins and minerals
Vitamins	Quantity %DV^{†}
Vitamin A equiv. beta-Carotene lutein zeaxanthin	3% 25 μg 3% 299 μg 277 μg
Thiamine (B1)	3% 0.041 mg
Riboflavin (B2)	2% 0.025 mg
Pantothenic acid (B5)	2% 0.091 mg
Vitamin B6	2% 0.042 mg
Folate (B9)	7% 29 μg
Vitamin C	3% 2.8 mg
Vitamin E	1% 0.18 mg
Vitamin K	20% 24.1 μg
Minerals	Quantity %DV^{†}
Calcium	1% 18 mg
Iron	2% 0.41 mg
Magnesium	2% 7 mg
Manganese	5% 0.125 mg
Phosphorus	2% 20 mg
Potassium	5% 141 mg
Sodium	0% 10 mg
Zinc	1% 0.15 mg
- Other constituents: Quantity
- Water: 95.6 g
- Link to USDA Database entry
- ^{†}Percentages estimated using US recommendations for adults, except for potassium, which is estimated based on expert recommendation from the National Academies.

Raw iceberg lettuce is 96% water, 3% carbohydrates, and contains negligible protein and fat (table). In a reference amount of 100 grams (3.5 oz), iceberg lettuce supplies 14 calories and is a rich source (20% or more of the Daily Value, DV) of vitamin K (20% DV), with no other micronutrients in significant content (table).

In lettuce varieties with dark green leaves, such as romaine (also called cos), vitamin A contents are appreciable due to the presence of the provitamin A compound, beta-carotene. Dark green varieties of lettuce also contain moderate amounts of calcium and iron. The edible spine and ribs of the lettuce plant supply dietary fiber, while micronutrients are contained in the leaf portion.

== Food-borne illness ==
Food-borne pathogens that can survive on lettuce include Listeria monocytogenes, the causative agent of listeriosis, which multiplies in storage. However, despite high levels of bacteria being found on ready-to-eat lettuce products, a 2008 study found no incidents of food-borne illness related to listeriosis, possibly due to the product's short shelf life, indigenous microflora competing with the Listeria bacteria or inhibition of bacteria to cause listeriosis.

Other bacteria found on lettuce include Aeromonas species, which have not been linked to any outbreaks; Campylobacter species, which cause campylobacteriosis; and Yersinia intermedia and Yersinia kristensenii (species of Yersinia), which have been found mainly in lettuce. Salmonella bacteria, including the uncommon Salmonella braenderup type, have also caused outbreaks traced to contaminated lettuce. Viruses, including hepatitis A, calicivirus and a Norwalk-like strain, have been found in lettuce. The vegetable has also been linked to outbreaks of parasitic infestations, including Giardia lamblia.

Lettuce has been linked to numerous outbreaks of the bacteria E.coli O157:H7 and Shigella; the plants were most likely contaminated through contact with animal or human feces. A 2007 study determined that the vacuum cooling method, especially prevalent in the California lettuce industry, increased the uptake and survival rates of E. coli O157:H7. Scientific experiments using treated municipal wastewater as irrigation for romaine lettuce have shown that the contamination levels of foliage, leachate, and soil with E. coli and bacteriophage AP205 (used by researchers as a surrogate for enteric viruses), respectively, were directly correlated with the presence of these organisms in the irrigation water.

Due to the increase in food demand, the use of treated wastewater effluent for irrigation and animal or human excreta (i.e., manure or biosolids) as soil amendments is increasing. As such, so are the outbreaks of food-borne illnesses. Due to the overuse of antibiotics in farming, the number of pathogens resistant to antibiotics is increasing, one of these being AR E.coli, which has been found on lettuce irrigated with wastewater.

Pathogens found on lettuce are not specific to lettuce (though some E. coli strains have affinity for Romaine). But, unlike other vegetables which tend to be cooked, lettuce is eaten raw, thus food-borne outbreaks associated with it are more frequent and affect a larger number of people.

== Cited literature ==
- Bradley, Fern Marshall; Ellis, Barbara W.; Martin, Deborah L., eds. (2009). The Organic Gardener's Handbook of Natural Pest and Disease Control. Rodale. ISBN 978-1-60529-677-7.
- Davey, M. R.; Anthony, P.; Van Hooff, P.; Power, J. B.; Lowe, K. C. (2007). "Lettuce". Transgenic Crops. Biotechnology in Agriculture and Forestry. Vol. 59. Springer. ISBN 978-3-540-36752-9.
- Katz, Solomon H.; Weaver, Williams Woys (2003). Encyclopedia of Food and Culture. Vol. 2. Scribner. ISBN 978-0-684-80565-8.
- Weaver, William Woys (1997). Heirloom Vegetable Gardening: A Master Gardener's Guide to Planting, Seed Saving and Cultural History. Henry Holt and Company. ISBN 978-0-8050-4025-8.
