= Bolting (horticulture) =

Rapid stem growth behavior in plants

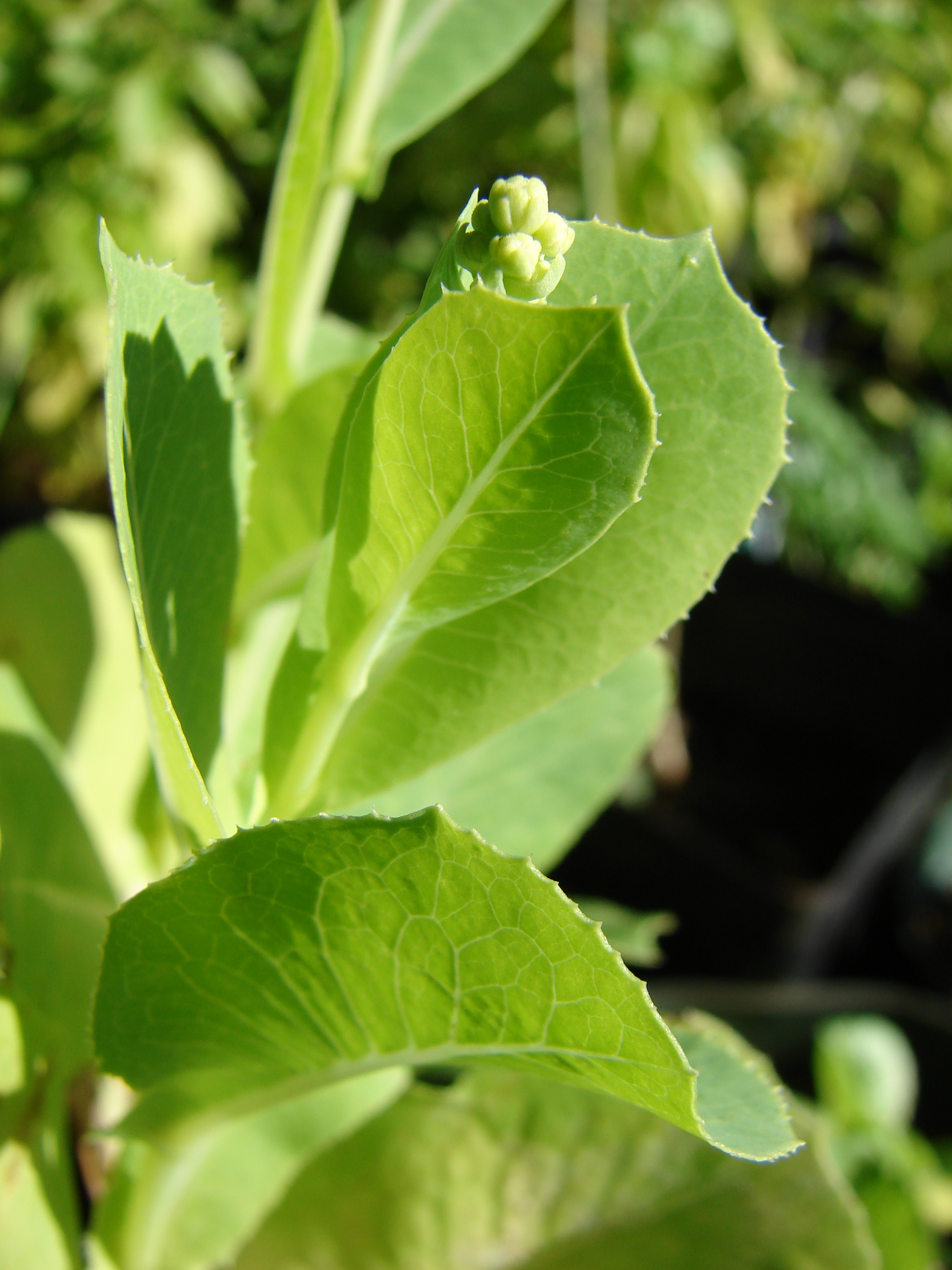
A lettuce (Lactuca sativa) plant in the process of bolting, having grown a stem with visible flower buds.

In horticulture, bolting is the production of a flowering stem (or stems) on agricultural and horticultural crops before the harvesting of a crop, at a stage when a plant makes a natural attempt to produce seeds and to reproduce. The flowering stems are usually vigorous extensions of existing leaf-bearing stems; to produce them, a plant diverts resources from producing the edible parts (such as leaves or roots), resulting in changes in flavor and texture, withering, and in general, a poor-quality harvest. Plants that have produced flowering stems in this way are said to have bolted. Crops inclined to bolt include lettuce, basil, beetroot, brassicas, spinach, celery, onion, and leek.

Bolting is induced by plant hormones of the gibberellin family, and can occur as a result of several factors, including changes in day length, the prevalence of high temperatures at particular stages in a plant's growth-cycle, and the existence of stresses such as insufficient water or minerals. These factors may interact in a complex way. Day-length may affect the propensity to bolt in that some plants are "long day plants", some are "short day plants" and some are "day neutral" (see photoperiodism), so for example when a long day plant, such as spinach, experiences increasingly long days that reach a particular length, it will tend to bolt. Low or high temperatures can affect the propensity of some plants to bolt if they occur for sufficient periods at particular points in the life-cycle of the plant; once these conditions have been met, plants that require such a trigger will subsequently bolt – regardless of subsequent temperatures. Plants under stress may respond by bolting so that they can produce seeds before they die.

Plant breeders have introduced cultivars of "bolt-proof" crops that are less prone to the condition.
