= Botrydial =

Names
- Preferred IUPAC name (1S,3aR,4S,6R,7S,7aS)-1,7-Diformyl-7a-hydroxy-1,3,3,6-tetramethyloctahydro-1H-inden-4-yl acetate

Identifiers
| CAS Number | 54986-75-3 |
| 3D model (JSmol) | Interactive image |
| Beilstein Reference | 2058987 |
| ChEBI | CHEBI:3159 |
| ChEMBL | ChEMBL476877 |
| ChemSpider | 161498 |
| KEGG | C09622 |
| PubChem CID | 185781 |
| UNII | 2VQE1Z1G8Q |
| CompTox Dashboard (EPA) | DTXSID20970337 |
- InChI: InChI=1S/C17H26O5/c1-10-6-13(22-11(2)20)14-15(3,4)8-16(5,9-19)17(14,21)12(10)7-18/h7,9-10,12-14,21H,6,8H2,1-5H3/t10-,12+,13+,14+,16-,17-/m1/s1 Key: SJFIYVCSGNWVPJ-GKKOWQTJSA-N; InChI=1/C17H26O5/c1-10-6-13(22-11(2)20)14-15(3,4)8-16(5,9-19)17(14,21)12(10)7-18/h7,9-10,12-14,21H,6,8H2,1-5H3/t10-,12+,13+,14+,16-,17-/m1/s1 Key: SJFIYVCSGNWVPJ-GKKOWQTJBB
- SMILES: O=C[C@]1(CC([C@@H]2[C@@H](OC(=O)C)C[C@H]([C@H](C=O)[C@]12O)C)(C)C)C

Properties
| Chemical formula | C_{17}H_{26}O_{5} |
| Molar mass | 310.390 g·mol^{−1} |
| Density | 1.15 g/mL |
- Except where otherwise noted, data are given for materials in their standard state (at 25 °C [77 °F], 100 kPa). verify (what is ?) Infobox references

Botrydial is secondary metabolite secreted by the fungus Botrytis cinerea which is phytotoxic. Chemically it is a sesquiterpene. Botrydial was first isolated and described in 1974. B. cinerea is the causal agent of gray mold disease and is known to attack a wide range of plants (over 200 species) producing leaf-spot diseases and mildews on lettuces and tomatoes as well as rotting berries. For this reason, botrydial, as well as other B. cinerea originated sesquiterpene metabolites, represent an economically important disease for ornamental and agriculturally important crops. From all the metabolites produced by this fungus, Botrydial exhibits the highest phytotoxic activity.

== Biosynthesis ==
Botrydial originates from the BcBOT2 (Botrytis cinerea BOTrydial biosynthesis) mediated cyclization of farnesyl diphosphate (FPP) to key intermediate tricyclic alcohol presilphiperfolan-8β-ol. Pinedo et al. demonstrated that BcBOT2 is in fact a sesquiterpene synthase by incubation of FPP with recombinant BcBOT2 protein, which yielded the expected presilphiperfolan-8-ol as the major product.

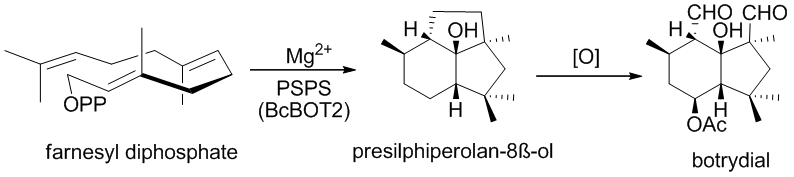

4 other genes are then involved in the biosynthesis of botrydial: 3 genes that encode for a P450 monooxygenase (BcBOT3, BcBOT1, BcBOT4) and a BcBOT5 gene whose amino acid sequence showed high homology to known acetyl transferases.

Figure 1. Five open reading frames of the botrydial biosynthetic gene cluster

This brought Pinedo et al. to the conclusion that BcBOT5 is probably responsible for introducing the acetyl group on C-4. They also concluded from quantitative reverse transcription-PCR (qRT-PCR) analysis that the five consecutive genes are co-regulated by the same BCG1-calcineurim transduction pathway.

== Mechanism of enzymatic formation of presilphiperfolan-8β-ol ==
Recently in an ASAP article in The Journal of the American Chemistry Society, Cane et al. confirmed experimentally, using deuterium labeling and NMR spectroscopy, the mechanism by which FPP cyclizes into presilphiperfolan-8β-ol. The mechanism consist of elimination of the diphosphate group followed by carbocation mediated cyclizations and rearrangements.

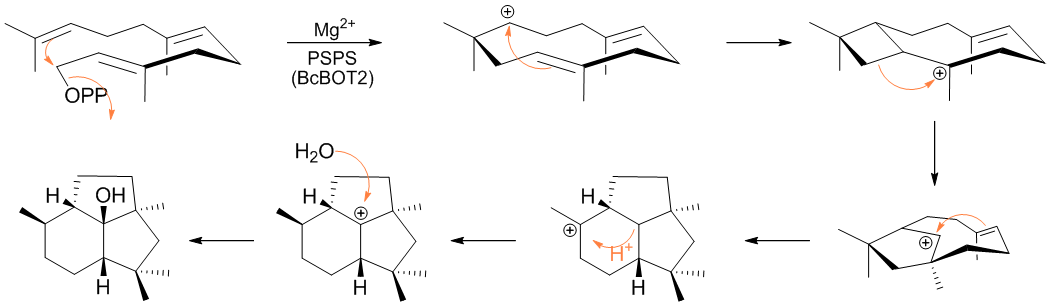

After the formation of presilphiperfolan-8β-ol, BcBOT5 gives way to acetylation of C-4 position, then hydroxylation of the probotryane skeleton occurs in a two-step process followed by oxidative cleavage of the new formed diol to yield botrydial.

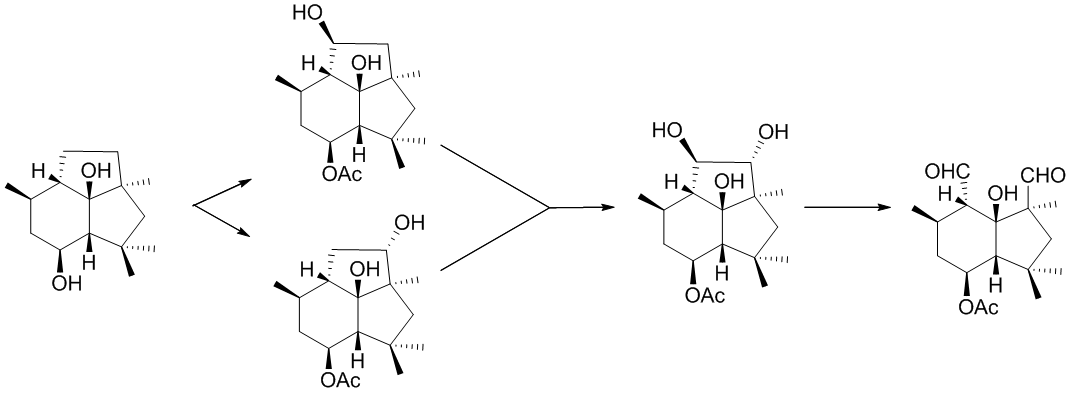

== Mechanism of action ==
Botrydial is produced by Botrytis cinerea when the host plant is infected. As a result, botrydial induces chlorosis and cell collapse. Additionally, aggressive strains of the fungus secrets polyketides such as botcinic acid that exhibit phytotoxic and antifungal activity.
