= Celtuce =

Lettuce cultivar

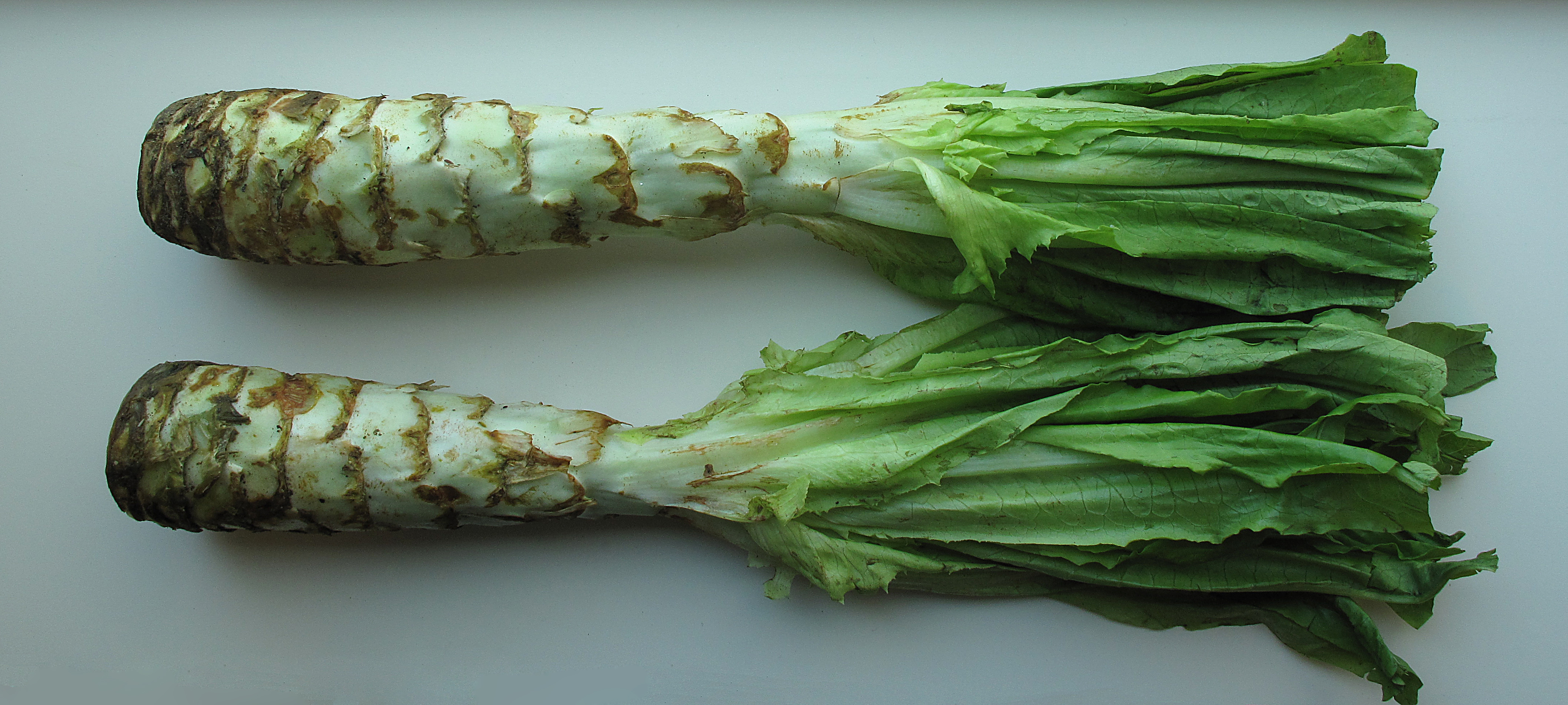
- Celtuce stems and heads
- Species: Lactuca sativa var. augustana
- Cultivar: 'Celtuce'
- Origin: Mediterranean region

Celtuce, raw
Nutritional value per 100 g (3.5 oz)
- Energy: 75 kJ (18 kcal)
- Carbohydrates: 3.65 g
- Dietary fiber: 1.7 g
- Fat: 0.3 g
- Protein: 0.85 g
Vitamins and minerals
Vitamins	Quantity %DV^{†}
Vitamin A equiv.	19% 175 μg
Thiamine (B1)	5% 0.055 mg
Riboflavin (B2)	5% 0.07 mg
Niacin (B3)	3% 0.55 mg
Pantothenic acid (B5)	4% 0.183 mg
Vitamin B6	3% 0.05 mg
Folate (B9)	12% 46 μg
Vitamin C	22% 19.5 mg
Minerals	Quantity %DV^{†}
Calcium	3% 39 mg
Iron	3% 0.55 mg
Magnesium	7% 28 mg
Manganese	30% 0.688 mg
Phosphorus	3% 39 mg
Potassium	11% 330 mg
Sodium	0% 11 mg
Zinc	2% 0.27 mg
- Link to USDA Database entry
- ^{†}Percentages estimated using US recommendations for adults, except for potassium, which is estimated based on expert recommendation from the National Academies.

Celtuce (/ˈsɛltəs/) (Lactuca sativa var. augustana, angustata, or asparagina), also called stem lettuce, celery lettuce, asparagus lettuce, or Chinese lettuce, is a cultivar of lettuce grown primarily for its thick stem or its leaves, which are known as A-choy. It is used as a vegetable. In China, the family is informally called woju (traditional Chinese: 萵苣; simplified Chinese: 莴苣; pinyin: wōjù), which is also the name of a cultivar. It is especially popular in both China and Taiwan, where the stem is interchangeably called wosun (traditional Chinese: 萵筍; simplified Chinese: 莴笋; pinyin: wōsǔn) or qingsun (青筍; 青笋; qīngsǔn).

== History ==
Popular sources identify it as originating in the Mediterranean region and then being brought to China during the Tang dynasty, about A.D. 600–900.

== Cultivation ==
It can be grown from seed and is sown from April through May in the Northern Hemisphere. The seeds can be planted in a set bed or a temporary nursery bed and then transplanted to the growing site. They should be spread 30 cm apart each way. The young (edible) leaves are ready about 4–5 weeks after planting and the edible stems are ready when about 30 cm tall. They are usually harvested between July and September.

The plant can suffer from aphid attacks.

== Uses ==
=== Culinary ===
The pale green leaves, which are tender, and white stems can be eaten raw (in salads) or cooked. It can be pickled, grilled, roasted, or stir-fried. It is mild but nutty, with a slight smoky aftertaste. It is high in vitamins.

The stem is usually harvested at a length of around 15–20 cm and a diameter of around 3–4 cm. It is crisp, moist, and mildly flavored, and typically prepared by slicing and then stir frying with more strongly flavored ingredients.

It is also available as pickled stems. In China the pickled stem is often eaten as a side dish.

In the United States, celtuce is being used as a gluten-free pasta substitute.

== See also ==
- List of vegetables
