= Portentol =

Names
- Preferred IUPAC name (1S,2S,3S,3′R,4R,4′R,5′S,6′R,8R)-4′-Hydroxy-1,3,3′,5′,6′,8-hexamethyl-5-oxaspiro[bicyclo[2.2.2]octane-2,2′-oxane]-6,7-dione

Identifiers
| CAS Number | 21795-25-5 |
| 3D model (JSmol) | Interactive image |
| ChemSpider | 10192631 |
| PubChem CID | 177166 |
| UNII | 0726883SQG |
| CompTox Dashboard (EPA) | DTXSID10944401 |
- InChI: InChI=1S/C17H26O5/c1-7-11(5)22-17(9(3)12(7)18)10(4)13-8(2)14(19)16(17,6)15(20)21-13/h7-13,18H,1-6H3/t7-,8-,9-,10+,11-,12-,13+,16+,17+/m1/s1 Key: CVPVGRDVSAJUQS-ACMDZGLISA-N
- SMILES: C[C@@H]1[C@H](O[C@@]2([C@@H]([C@@H]1O)C)[C@H]([C@@H]3[C@H](C(=O)[C@]2(C(=O)O3)C)C)C)C

Properties
| Chemical formula | C_{17}H_{26}O_{5} |
| Molar mass | 310.390 g·mol^{−1} |
| Melting point | 260-261 °C (500-502 °F; 533-534 K) |
- Except where otherwise noted, data are given for materials in their standard state (at 25 °C [77 °F], 100 kPa). Infobox references

Portentol is a complex polyketide first isolated in 1967 from the lichen Roccella portentosa and has since been extracted from various other lichen. It has exhibited moderate activity toward several cancer cell lines. Of greater interest is the structural skeleton and chemical space the molecule possesses, which were ultimately determined by detailed NMR studies and X-ray analysis. The spiro tricyclic core contains nine consecutive stereocenters, two of which are adjacent quaternary centers, and a β-keto-δ-lactone moiety. The densely functionalized natural product offered an exciting challenge to total synthesis.

== Biosynthesis ==
The first isolation and characterization of Portentol was accomplished by D. J. Aberhart and K. H. Overton in 1970. Despite being known for several decades, the natural product was not synthesized until 2015. Their total synthesis follows a biomimetic route and has shed light on the mechanism of Portentol's biosynthesis.

Isotope labeling studies indicate the carbon chain of Portentol is composed of acetate and malonate, suggesting the natural product is generated via the Acetate pathway. Biosynthetically, it has been proposed that Portentol originates from a fully linear enzyme bound thioester (1) and can then be cyclized to an intermediate (2) by a type II polyketide synthase (PKS). The PKS is first loaded with Acetyl-CoA and elongated with methyl-malonate units to arrive at the precursor 2. This precursor can then undergo acid catalyzed hemi-ketal formation within the cell to arrive at the oxocarbenium ion intermediate 3. The final bond formation between C7 and C2 would involve an intramolecular nucleophilic addition of an enolized β-keto-δ-lactone moiety onto 3. The total synthesis of Portentol utilized a proposed double cyclization cascade beginning with precursor 2, cyclization to intermediate 3, and ending with the formation of Portentol. The stereoisomer of Portentol with respect to C7 was not observed. Given this and the high yield and ease of the reaction, it is conceivable that a similar process occurs in nature which likely requires enzymatic catalysis.
