= Companies listed on the New York Stock Exchange (C) =

== C ==
Stock name	Symbol	Country of origin
C3.ai	AI	US
Cabot Corporation	CBT	US
CACI	CACI	US
CAE Inc.	CAE	Canada
CAI International.	CAP	US
Cal Dive International	DVR	US
Calgon Carbon	CCC	US
California Water Service Group	CWT	US
Calix, Inc.	CALX	US
Callaway Golf Company	ELY	US
Callon Petroleum Company	CPE	US
Calpine	CPN	US
Cambrex Corporation	CBM	US
Camden Property Trust	CPT	US
Cameco	CCJ	Canada
Campbell's	CPB	US
Campus Crest Communities	CCG	US
Canada Goose	GOOS	Canada
Canadian Imperial Bank of Commerce	CM	Canada
Canadian National Railway	CNI	Canada
Canadian Natural Resources	CNQ	Canada
Canadian Pacific Railway	CP	Canada
Canon Inc.	CAJ	Japan
Canopy Growth Corporation	CGC	Canada
Cantel Medical Corporation	CMN	US
Capital One	COF	US
Cardinal Health	CAH	US
Carlisle Companies	CSL	US
CarMax	KMX	US
Carnival Corporation	CCL	US
Carpenter Technology Corporation	CRS	US
Carriage Services	CSV	US
Carter's	CRI	US
Cash America International	CSH	US
Castlight Health	CSLT	US
Caterpillar Inc.	CAT	US
Cato Corporation	CATO	US
CBIZ, Inc.	CBZ	US
CBL & Associates Properties	CBL	US
CBRE Group	CBG	US
CDI Corporation	CDI	US
Cedar Fair	FUN	US
Celadon Group	CGI	US
Celanese	CE	US
Celestica	CLS	Canada
Cellcom Israel, Ltd.	CEL	Israel
Cementos Pacasmayo	CPAC	Peru
Cemex	CX	Mexico
Cencosud	CNCO	Chile
Cenovus Energy	CVE	US
Centene Corporation	CNC	US
CenterPoint Energy	CNP	US
Eletrobras	EBR	Brazil
Central Pacific Bank	CPF	US
Century Communities	CCS	US
CenturyLink	CTL	US
Cenveo	CVO	US
CF Industries	CF	US
CGG	CGG	France
CGI Group	GIB	Canada
Chambers Street Properties	CSG	US
ChannelAdvisor Corporation	ECOM	US
Charles River Laboratories	CRL	US
Charles Schwab Corporation	SCHW	US
Chatham Lodging Trust	CLDT	US
Checkpoint Systems	CKP	US
Cheesecake Factory	CAKE	US
Cheetah Mobile	CMCM	China
Chegg	CHGG	US
Chemed Corporation	CHE	US
Chemtura	CHMT	US
Cherry Hill Mortgage Investment Corporation	CHMI	US
Chesapeake Granite Wash Trust	CHKR	US
Chesapeake Utilities	CPK	US
Chevron Corporation	CVX	US
Chicago Bridge & Iron Company	CBI	US
Chimera Investment Corporation	CIM	US
China Green Agriculture	CGA	China
China Yuchai International	CYD	Singapore
Chipotle Mexican Grill	CMG	US
Choice Hotels	CHH	US
Chubb Limited	CB	US
Chunghwa Telecom	CHT	Taiwan
Church & Dwight	CHD	US
Ciena	CIEN	US
Cigna	CI	US
Cinemark Theatres	CNK	US
Citigroup	C	US
Citizens, Inc.	CIA	US
City National Corporation	CYN	US
City Office REIT	CIO	Canada
Civeo Corporation	CVEO	US
Clarcor	CLC	US
Clean Harbors	CLH	US
Clear Channel Outdoor	CCO	US
Clearwater Paper	CLW	US
CLECO	CNL	US
Cleveland-Cliffs	CLF	US
Clorox	CLX	US
Cloud Peak Energy	CLD	US
ClubCorp	MYCC	US
CMS Energy	CMS	US
CNA Financial	CNA	US
CNH Industrial	CNHI	United Kingdom
CNO Financial Group	CNO	US
CNOOC Limited	CEO	China
Coach, Inc.	COH	US
Cobalt International Energy	CIE	US
The Coca-Cola Company	KO	US
Coca-Cola Enterprises	CCE	US
Coca-Cola FEMSA, S.A.B. De C.V.	KOF	Mexico
Coeur Mining	CDE	US
Cohen & Steers	CNS	US
Colgate-Palmolive	CL	US
Comcast	CCV	US
Comerica	CMA	US
Comfort Systems USA	FIX	US
Commercial Metals Company	CMC	US
Camping World	CWH	US
Community Bank, N.A.	CBU	US
Community Health Systems	CYH	US
Companhia Brasileira de Distribuição	CBD	Brazil
Sabesp	SBS	Brazil
CEMIG	CIG	Brazil
Copel	ELP	Brazil
Companhia Siderúrgica Nacional	SID	Brazil
Compass Diversified Holdings	CODI	US
Compass Minerals	CMP	US
Compañia de Minas Buenaventura SA	BVN	Peru
Compañía de las Cervecerías Unidas	CCU	Chile
Comstock Resources Inc.	CRK	US
ConAgra Foods	CAG	US
Concord Medical Services Holdings Limited	CCM	China
ConocoPhillips	COP	US
Consol Energy	CNX	US
Consolidated Edison	ED	US
Constellation Brands	STZ	US
Constellium	CSTM	US
The Container Store	TCS	US
Continental Resources	CLR	US
Volaris	VLRS	US
Convergys	CVG	US
The Cooper Companies	COO	US
Cooper-Standard Automotive	CPS	US
Cooper Tire & Rubber Company	CTB	US
Copa Holdings	CPA	Panama
Core Laboratories	CLB	Netherlands
CoreLogic	CLGX	US
Corning Inc.	GLW	US
Corpbanca	BCA	Chile
Corrections Corporation of America	CXW	US
Cosan	CZZ	Brazil
Costamare	CMRE	Greece
Coty, Inc.	COTY	US
Country Style Cooking Restaurant Chain Co.	CCSC	US
Cousins Properties	CUZ	US
Covanta Energy	CVA	US
Covidien	COV	Ireland
CPFL Energia	CPL	Brazil
Crane Co.	CR	US
Credicorp	BAP	Peru
CRH plc	CRH	Ireland
Cross Timbers Royalty Trust	CRT	US
Crown Castle	CCI	US
Crown Holdings	CCK	US
CryoLife	CRY	US
CSS Industries	CSS	US
CSX Corporation	CSX	US
CTS Corporation	CTS	US
CubeSmart	CUBE	US
Frost Bank	CFR	US
Cummins	CMI	US
Curtiss-Wright	CW	US
CVR Energy, Inc.	CVI	US
CVR Partners	UAN	US
CVS Health	CVS	US
