= Agriculture in China =

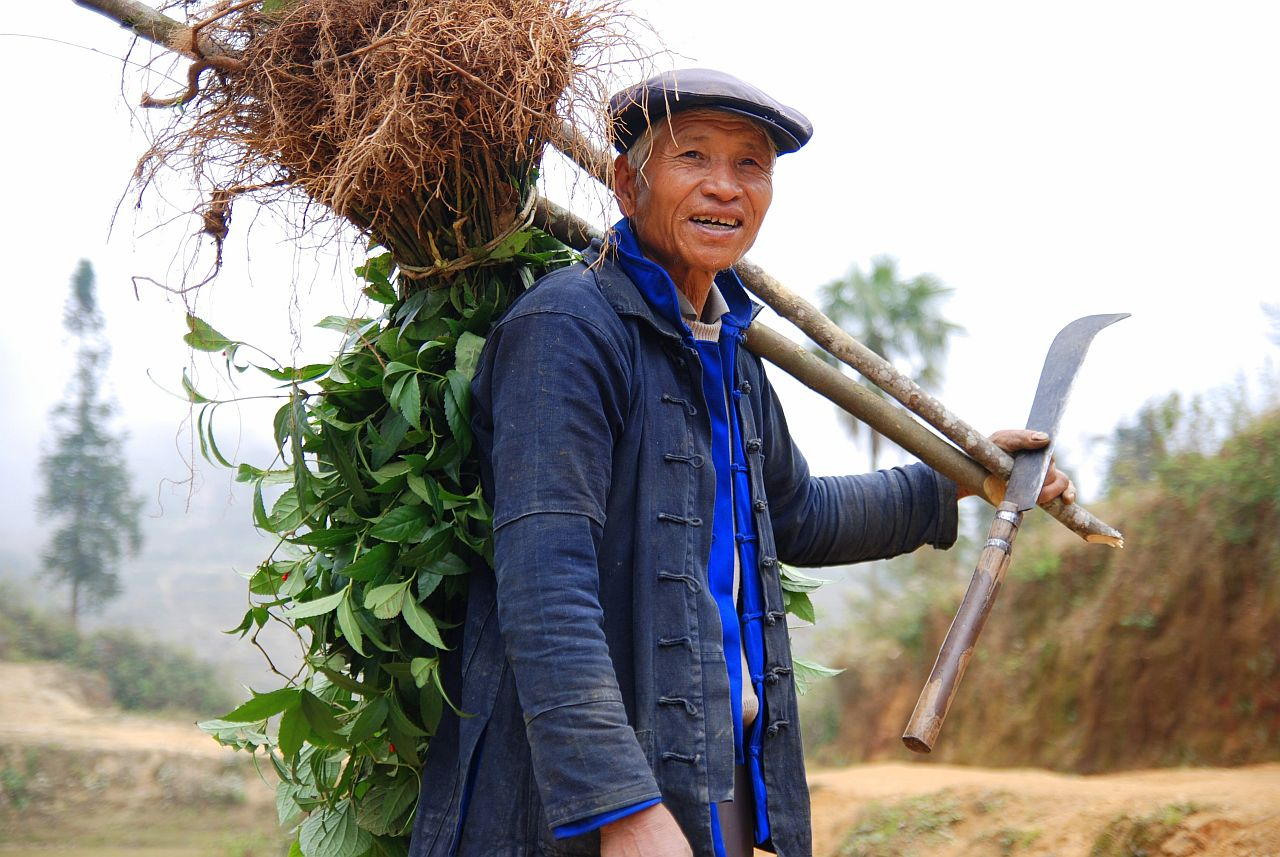
A farmer of the Hani minority, famous for their rice terraced mountains in Yuanyang County, Yunnan

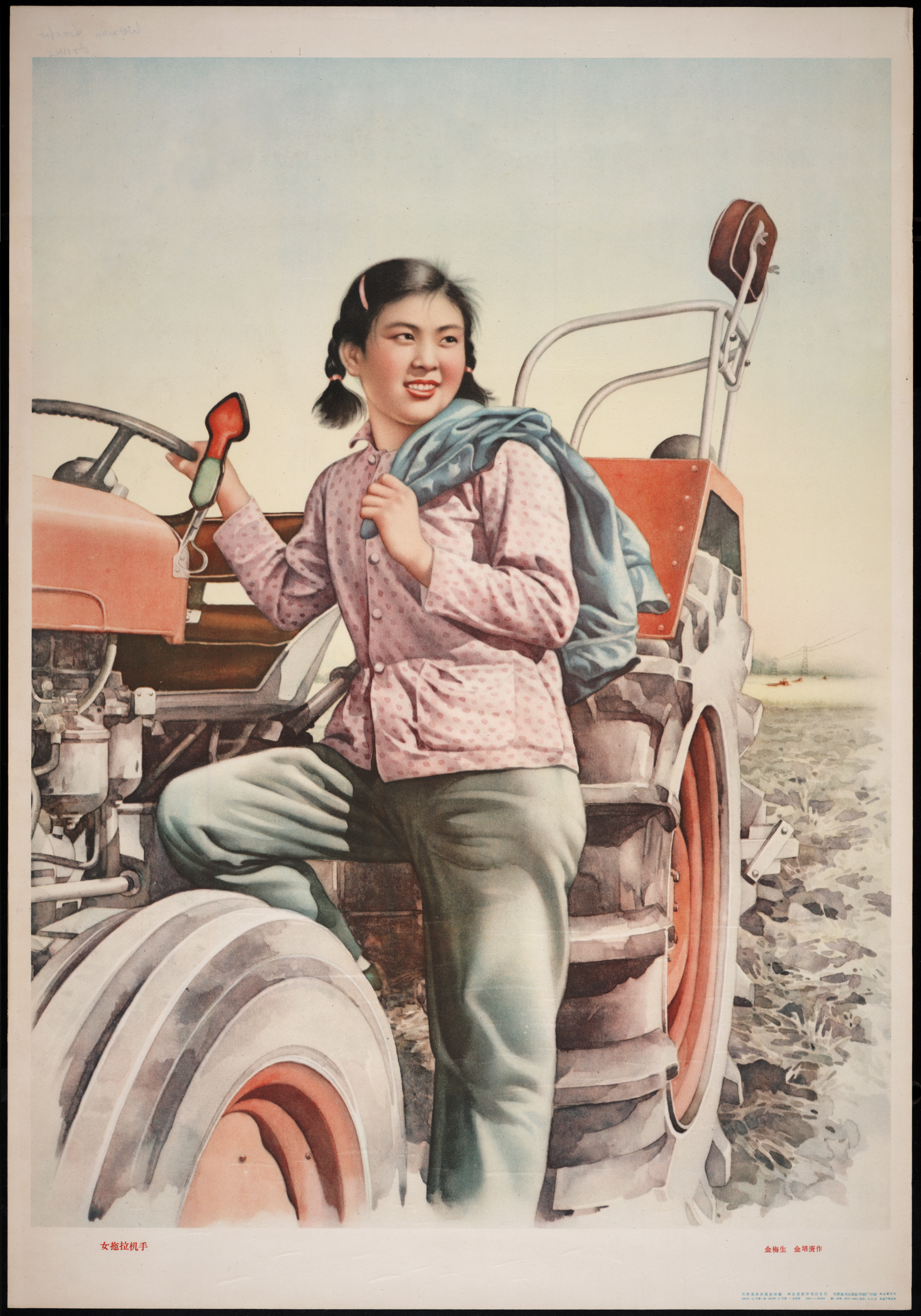
A female tractor driver in China depicted in a 1964 poster

Agriculture has been a cornerstone of the People's Republic of China (PRC) and its predecessors' economy and culture for millennia, supporting one of the world's largest populations and driving economic development. The country produces a diverse range of crops, including rice, wheat, corn, potatoes, soybeans, tomatoes, millet, cotton, tea, fruits, vegetables, and oilseeds. Due to limited arable land—which constitutes roughly 10% of China's total land area—intensive farming practices, innovative agricultural technologies, and efficient land-use management have historically been critical in meeting domestic food demands.

China's agricultural history dates back to the Neolithic era, with archaeological evidence showing early domestication and cultivation of rice and millet. Over the centuries, the introduction of newer agricultural technologies such as the moldboard plow, advanced irrigation systems, and crop rotation shaped society, as it generated greater agricultural surpluses. In the modern era, agriculture was notably impacted by state-led policies, including land reforms in the early years of the PRC, the collectivization efforts of the Great Leap Forward, and subsequent reforms such as the Family Production Responsibility System introduced during China's economic liberalization beginning in 1978.

Today, agriculture remains a critical sector in China, employing approximately 22% of the workforce. In recent decades, challenges including urbanization, loss of agricultural land to industrial expansion, climate change, water scarcity, food safety concerns, and inefficiencies in agricultural markets have influenced both policy and practice. To address these issues, the government has promoted innovations such as organic farming, peri-urban agriculture, and advanced seed technologies, aiming to secure food production, reduce dependency on imports, and improve rural livelihoods. China is currently the world's largest producer of numerous agricultural commodities and is a major participant in global agricultural trade, significantly affecting international markets due to its sizable production and consumption volumes.

== History ==
The development of farming over the course of China's history has played a key role in supporting the growth of one of the largest populations in the world.

=== Archaeology ===
Analysis of stone tools by Professor Liu Li and others has shown that hunter-gatherers 23,000–19,500 years ago ground wild plants with the same tools that would later be used for millet and rice.

Domesticated millet varieties Panicum miliaceum and Setaria italica may have originated in Northern China. Remains of domesticated millet have been found in northern China at Xinglonggou, Yuezhang, Dadiwan, Cishan, and several Peiligang sites. These sites cover a period over 7250-6050 BCE. The amount of domesticated millet eaten at these sites was proportionally quite low compared to other plants. At Xinglonggou, millet made up only 15% of all plant remains around 7200-6400 BCE; a ratio that changed to 99% by 2050-1550 BCE. Experiments have shown that millet requires very little human intervention to grow, which means that obvious changes in the archaeological record that could demonstrate millet was being cultivated do not exist.

Excavations at Kuahuqiao, the earliest known Neolithic site in eastern China, have documented rice cultivation 7,700 years ago. Approximately half of the plant remains belonged to domesticated japonica species, whilst the other half were wild types of rice. It is possible that the people at Kuahuqiao also cultivated the wild type. Finds at sites of the Hemudu Culture (c. 5500-3300 BCE) in Yuyao and Banpo near Xi'an include millet and spade-like tools made of stone and bone. Evidence of settled rice agriculture has been found at the Hemudu site of Tianluoshan (5000-4500 BCE), with rice becoming the backbone of the agricultural economy by the Majiabang culture in southern China. According to the Records of the Grand Historian some female prisoners in historic times were given the punishment to be "grain pounders" (Chinese: 刑舂) as an alternative to more severe corporal punishment like tattooing or cutting off a foot. Some scholars believe the four or five year limits on these hard labor sentences began with Emperor Wen's legal reforms.

There is also a long tradition involving agriculture in Chinese mythology. In his book Permanent Agriculture: Farmers of Forty Centuries (1911), Professor Franklin Hiram King described and extolled the values of the traditional farming practices of China.

=== Farming method improvements ===
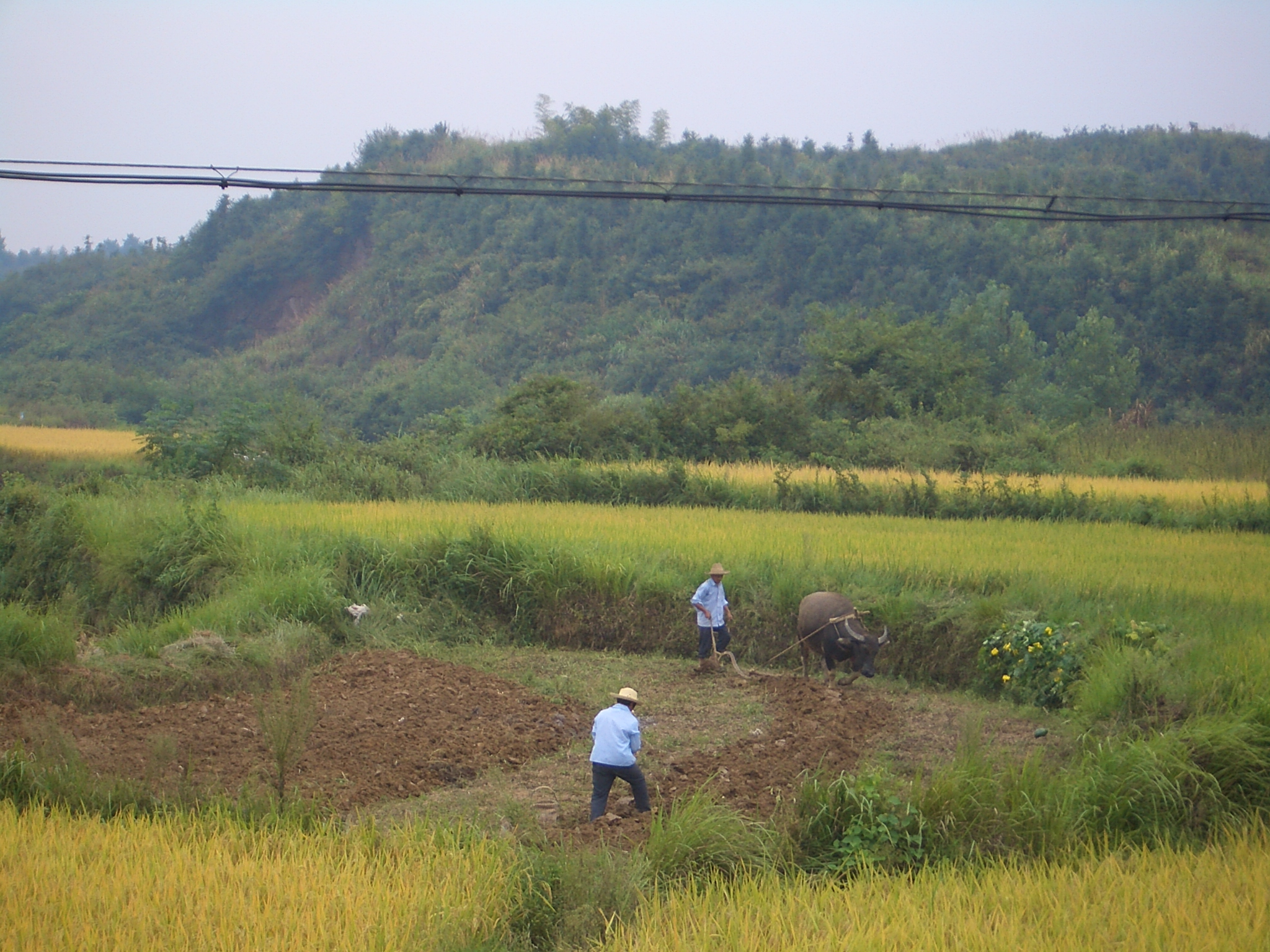
Ploughing with a buffalo, Hubei

Farming in China has always been very labor-intensive. However, throughout its history, various methods have been developed or imported that enabled greater farming production and efficiency. They also utilized the seed drill to help improve on row farming.

During the Spring and Autumn period (722–481 BC), two revolutionary improvements in farming technology took place. One was the use of cast iron tools and beasts of burden to pull plows, and the other was the large-scale harnessing of rivers and development of water conservation projects. The engineer Sunshu Ao of the 6th century BC and Ximen Bao of the 5th century BC are two of the oldest hydraulic engineers from China, and their works were focused on improving irrigation systems. These developments were widely spread during the ensuing Warring States period (403–221 BC), culminating in the enormous Du Jiang Yan Irrigation System engineered by Li Bing by 256 BC for the State of Qin in ancient Sichuan.

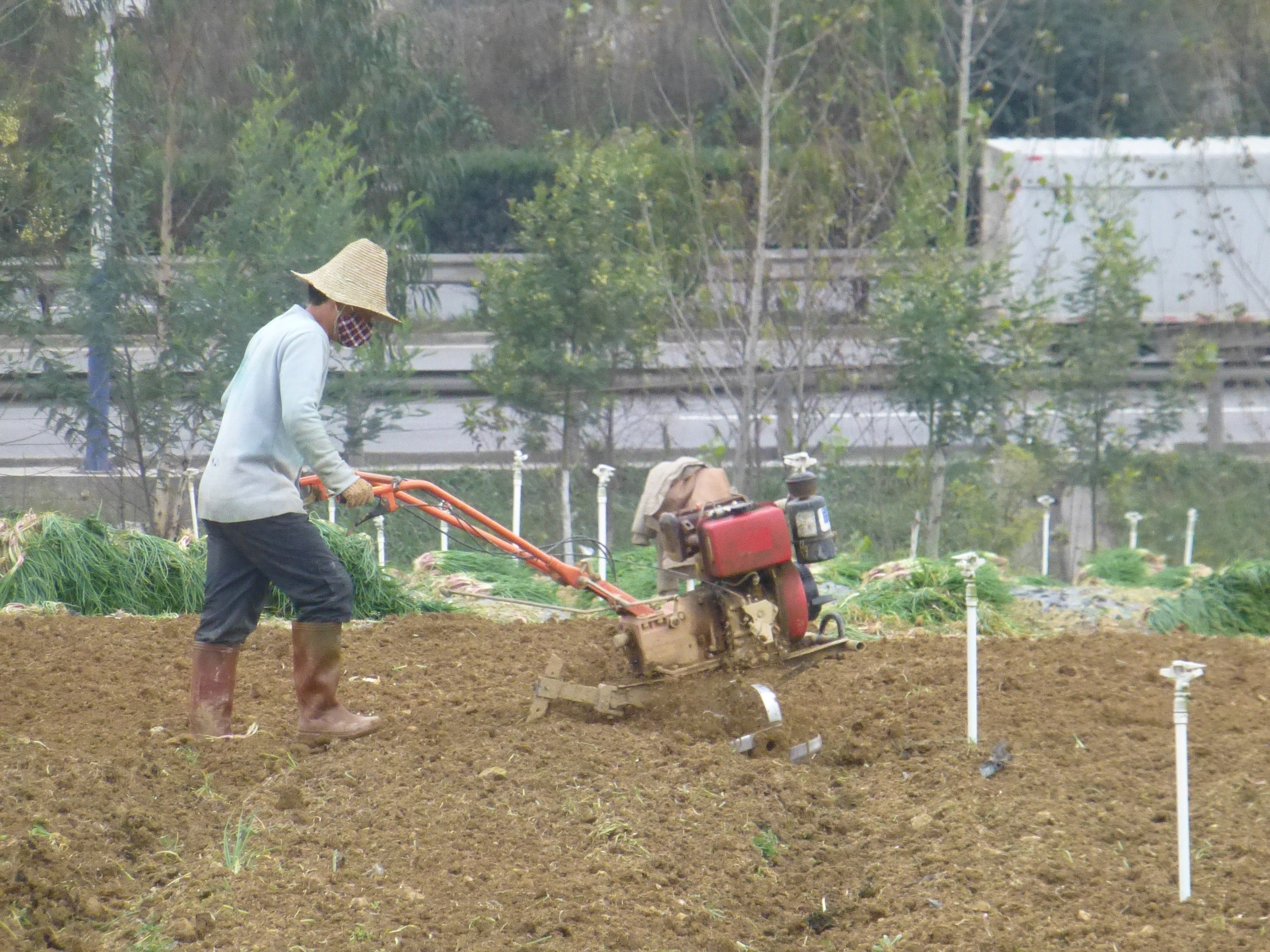
Ploughing with a motor plough, Yuxi, Yunnan

For agricultural purposes the Chinese had invented the hydraulic-powered trip hammer by the 1st century BC, during the ancient Han dynasty (202 BC-220 AD). Although it found other purposes, its main function was to pound, decorticate, and polish grain that otherwise would have been done manually. The Chinese also innovated the square-pallet chain pump by the 1st century AD, powered by a waterwheel or oxen pulling on a system of mechanical wheels. Although the chain pump found use in public works of providing water for urban and palatial pipe systems, it was used largely to lift water from a lower to higher elevation in filling irrigation canals and channels for farmland.

Chinese ploughs from Han times on fulfil all these conditions of efficiency nicely, which is presumably why the standard Han plough team consisted of two animals only, and later teams usually of a single animal, rather than the four, six or eight draught animals common in Europe before the introduction of the curved mould-board and other new principles of design in the + 18th century. Though the mould-board plough first appeared in Europe in early medieval, if not in late Roman, times, pre-eighteenth century mould-boards were usually wooden and straight (Fig. 59). The enormous labour involved in pulling such a clumsy construction necessitated large plough-teams, and this meant that large areas of land had to be reserved as pasture. In China, where much less animal power was required, it was not necessary to maintain the mixed arable-pasture economy typical of Europe: fallows could be reduced and the arable area expanded, and a considerably larger population could be supported than on the same amount of land in Europe.

— Francesca Bray

During the Eastern Jin (317–420) and the Northern and Southern Dynasties (420–589), the Silk Road and other international trade routes further spread farming technology throughout China. Political stability and a growing labor force led to economic growth, and people opened up large areas of wasteland and built irrigation works for expanded agricultural use. As land-use became more intensive and efficient, rice was grown twice a year and cattle began to be used for plowing and fertilization.

By the Tang dynasty (618–907), China had become a unified feudal agricultural society again. Improvements in farming machinery during this era included the moldboard plow and watermill. Later during the Yuan dynasty (1271–1368), cotton planting and weaving technology were extensively adopted and improved.

While around 750, 75% of China's population lived north of the river Yangtze, by 1250, 75% of the population lived south of the river. Such large-scale internal migration was possible due to the introduction of quick-ripening strains of rice from Vietnam suitable for multi-cropping. This is also possibly the result of Northern China falling to invaders. With the hardships that come from conflict, many Chinese may have moved South to not starve.

The Yuan, Ming, and Qing dynasties had seen the rise of collective help organizations between farmers.

In 1909 US Professor of Agriculture Franklin Hiram King made an extensive tour of China (as well as Japan and briefly Korea) and he described contemporary agricultural practices. He favourably described the farming of China as 'permanent agriculture' and his book 'Farmers of Forty Centuries', published posthumously in 1911, has become an agricultural classic and has been a favoured reference source for organic farming advocates. The book has inspired many community-supported agriculture farmers in China to conduct ecological farming.

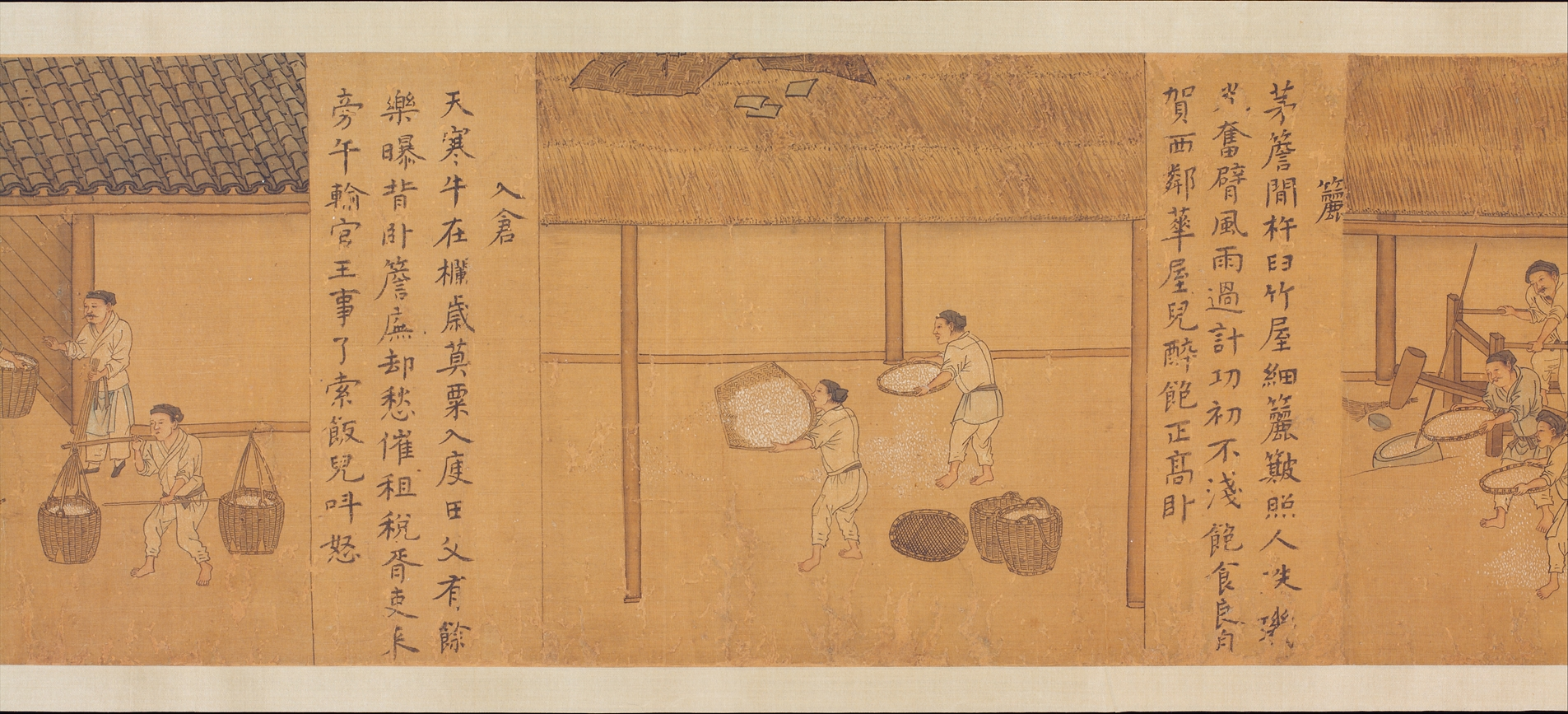
Scroll depicting rice production, Yuan dynasty

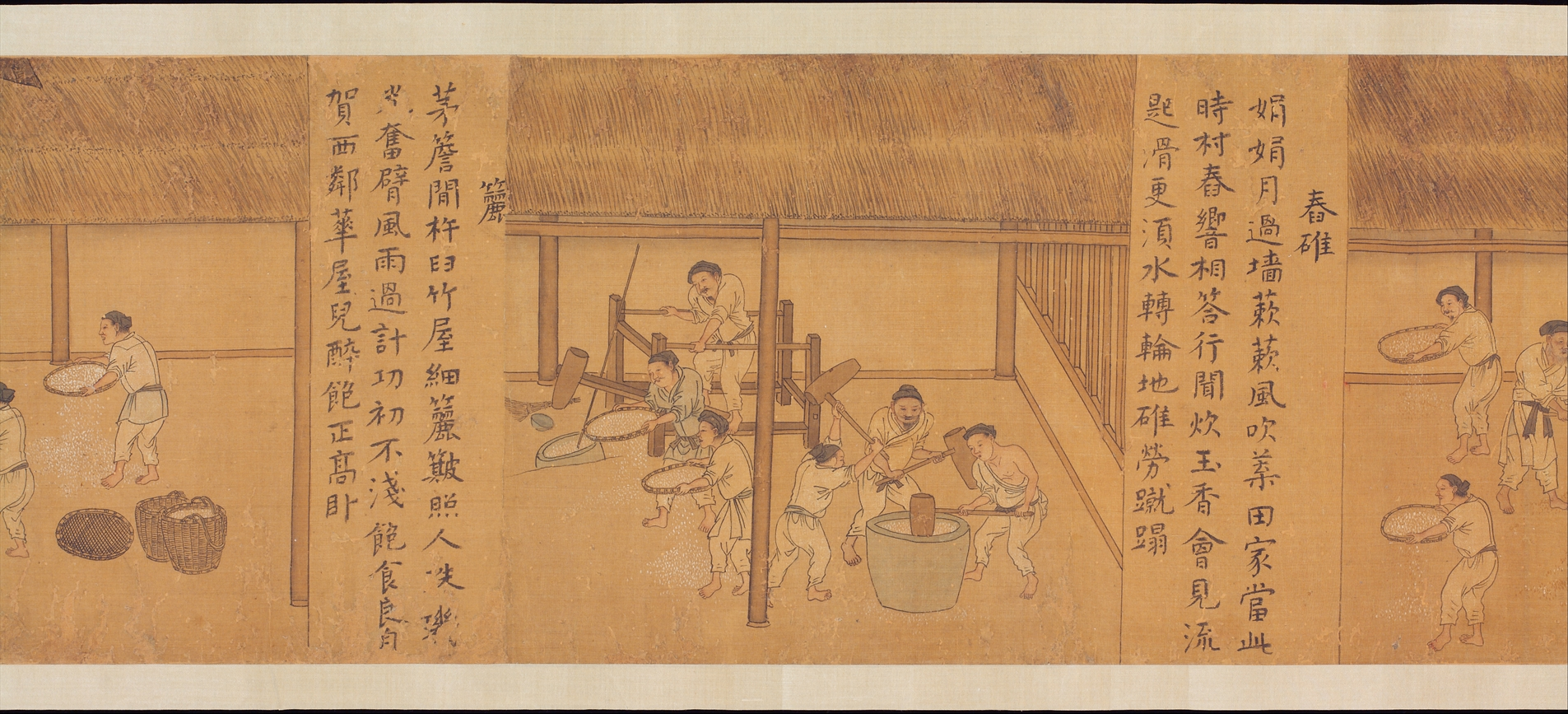

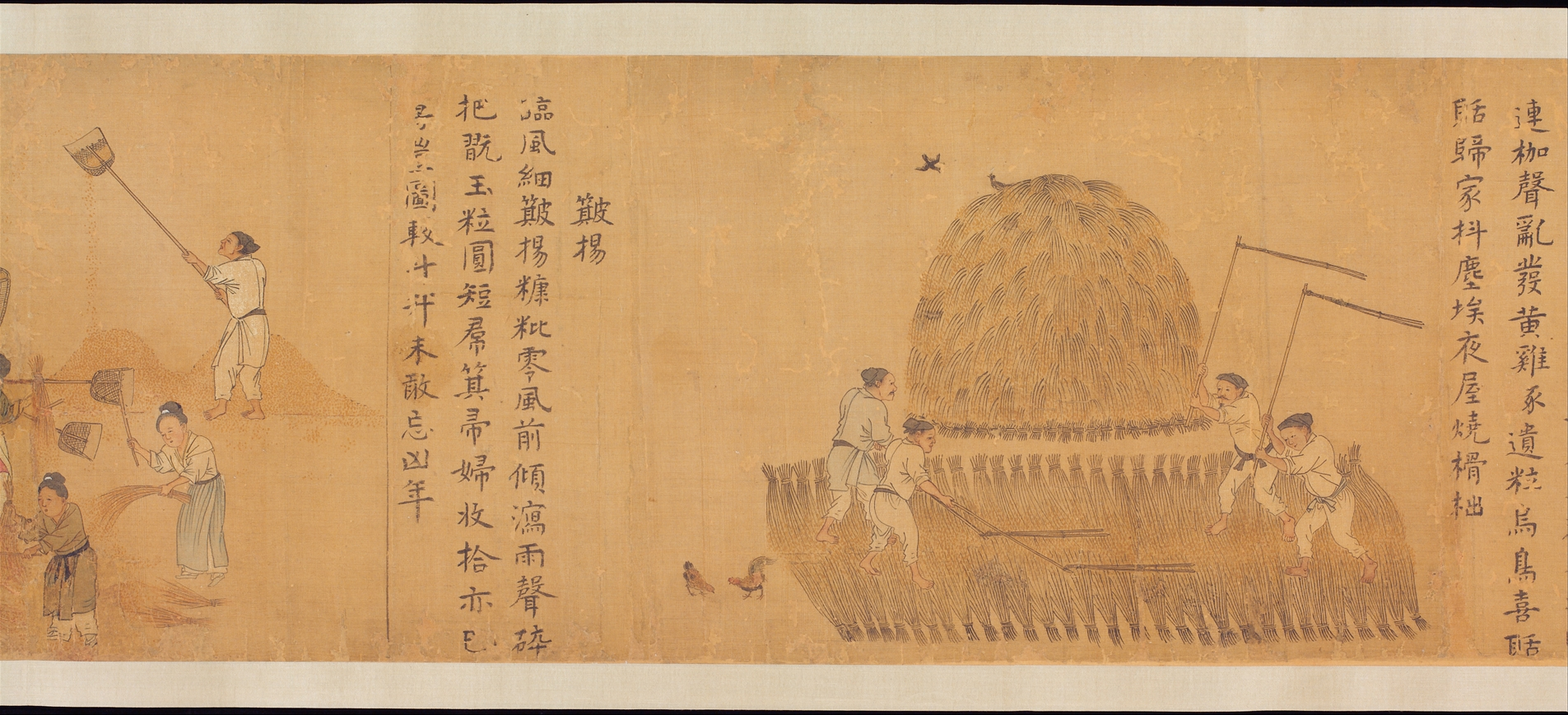

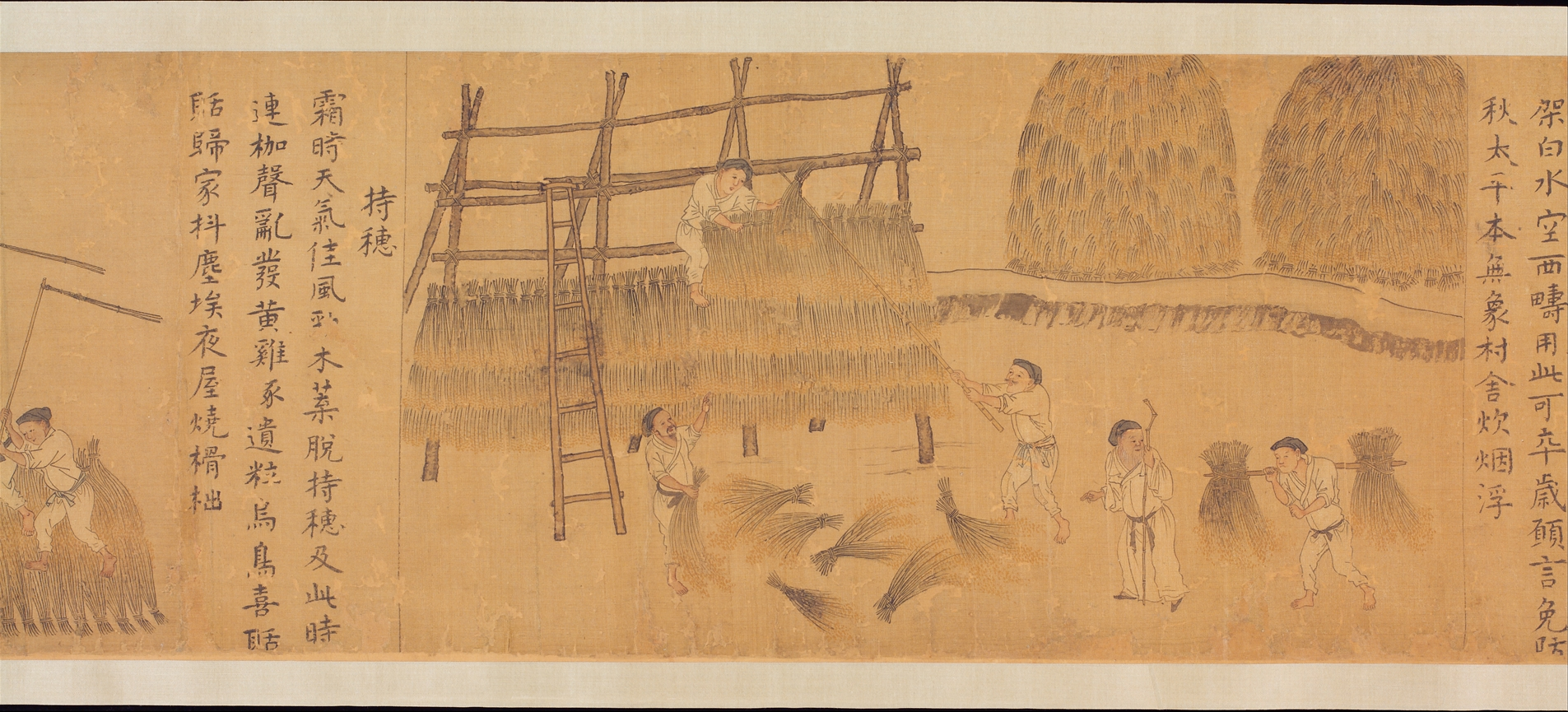

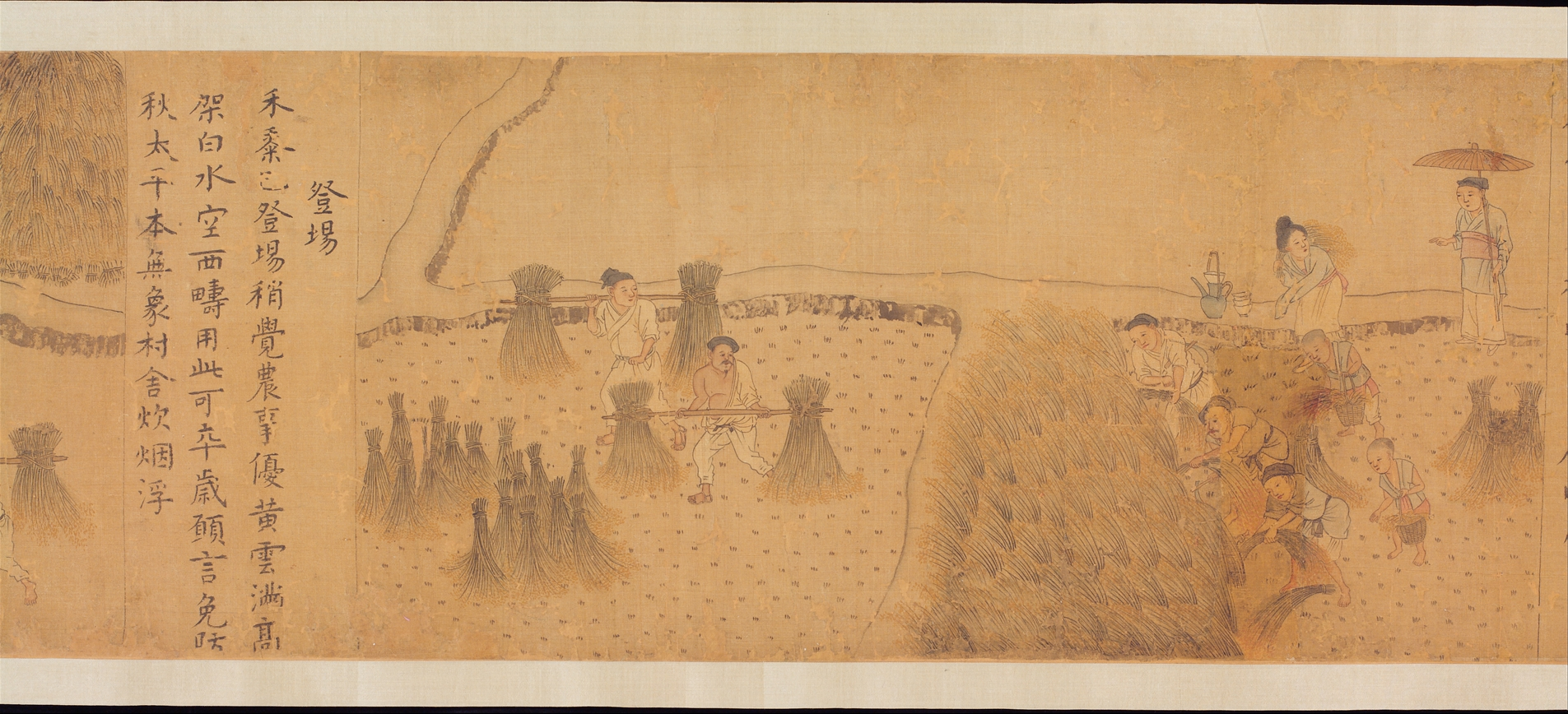

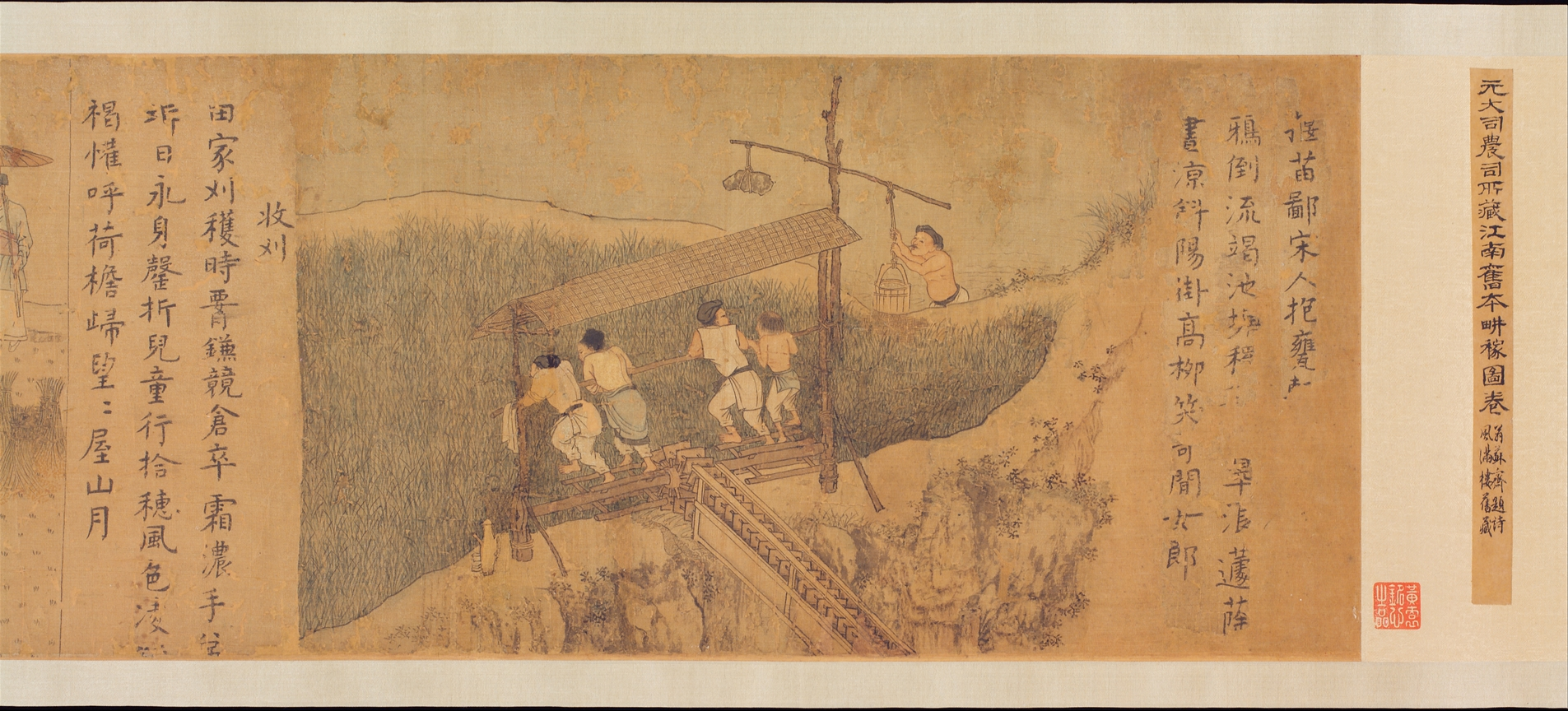

=== People's Republic of China ===
Development of agricultural output of China in 2015 US$ since 1961

Share of labour force employed in agriculture in China since 1990

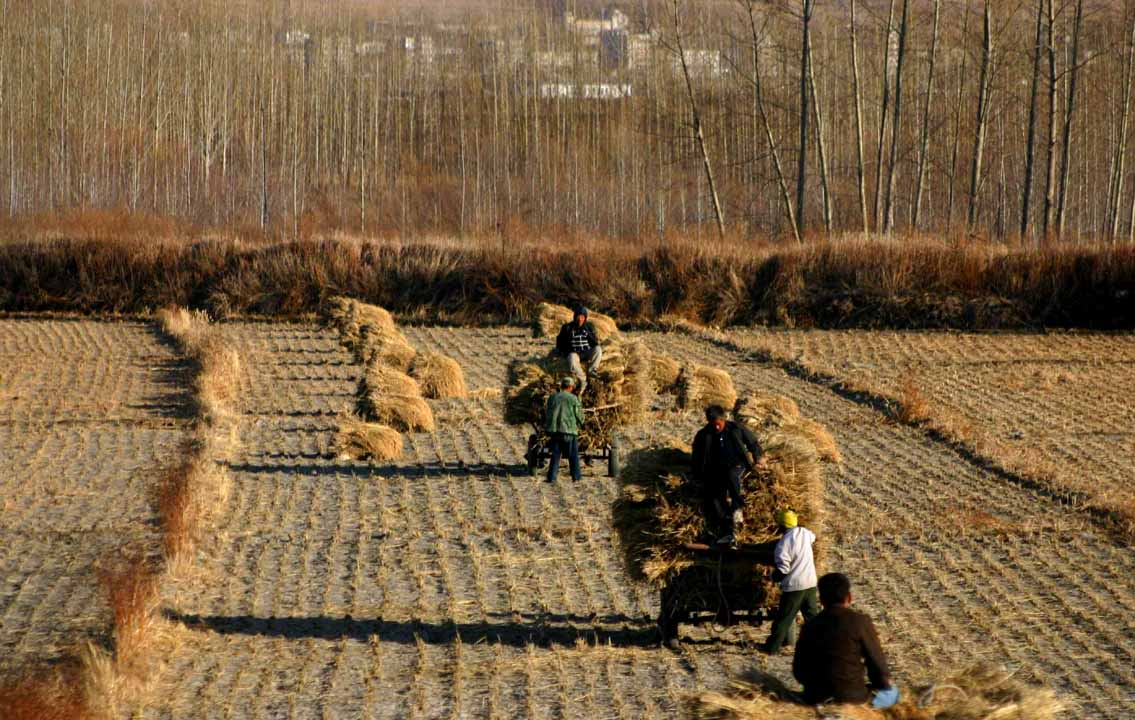
A harvest in China

Worldwide employment In agriculture, forestry and fishing in 2021. China has one of the highest number of people employed in these sectors.

Following the Chinese Communist Party's victory in the Chinese Civil War, control of the farmlands was taken away from landlords and redistributed to the 300 million peasant farmers, including purges of landlords during the Land Reform Movement. In 1952, gradually consolidating its power following the civil war, the government began organizing the peasants into teams. Three years later, these teams were combined into producer cooperatives, enacting the socialist goal of collective land ownership. In 1956, the government formally took control of the land, further structuring the farmland into large government-operated collective farms.

Collectivization was a factor in the most important change in Chinese agriculture in the dramatic increase in irrigated land during the early and mid-1950s. Collectivization also helped facilitate the labor-intensive practice of double-cropping in southern China, which greatly increased agricultural yields.

In the 1958 Great Leap Forward campaign initiated by Chairman of the Chinese Communist Party Mao Zedong, land use was placed under closer government control in an effort to improve agricultural output. In particular, the Four Pests campaign and mass eradication of sparrows had a direct negative impact on agriculture. Collectives were organized into communes, private food production was banned, and collective eating was required. Greater emphasis was also put on industrialization instead of agriculture. The farming inefficiencies created by this campaign led to the Great Chinese Famine, resulting in the deaths of somewhere between the government estimate of 14 million to scholarly estimates of 20 to 43 million. Although private plots of land were re-instated in 1962 due to this failure, communes remained the dominant rural unit of economic organization during the Cultural Revolution, with Mao championing the "Learn from Dazhai in agriculture" campaign. Tachai's semi-literate party secretary Chen Yonggui was among those outmaneuvered by Deng Xiaoping after the death of Mao: from 1982 to 1985, the Dazhai-style communes were gradually replaced by townships.

Beginning in 1978, as part of the Four Modernizations campaign, the Family Production Responsibility System was created, dismantling communes and giving agricultural production responsibility back to individual households. Households are now given crop quotas that they were required to provide to their collective unit in return for tools, draft animals, seeds, and other essentials. Households, which now lease land from their collectives, are free to use their farmland; however, they see fit as long as they meet these quotas. This freedom has given more power to individual families to meet their individual needs. In addition to these structural changes, the Chinese government also engages in irrigation projects (such as the Three Gorges Dam), runs large state farms, and encourages mechanization and fertilizer use.

By 1984, when about 99% of farm production teams had adopted the Family Production Responsibility System, the government began further economic reforms, aimed primarily at liberalizing agricultural pricing and marketing. In 1984, the government replaced mandatory procurement with voluntary contracts between farmers and the government.

After adoption of the socialist market economy, agricultural production increased significantly and China eliminated starvation.

In 1993, the government abolished the 40-year-old grain rationing system, leading to more than 90 percent of all annual agricultural produce to be sold at market-determined prices.

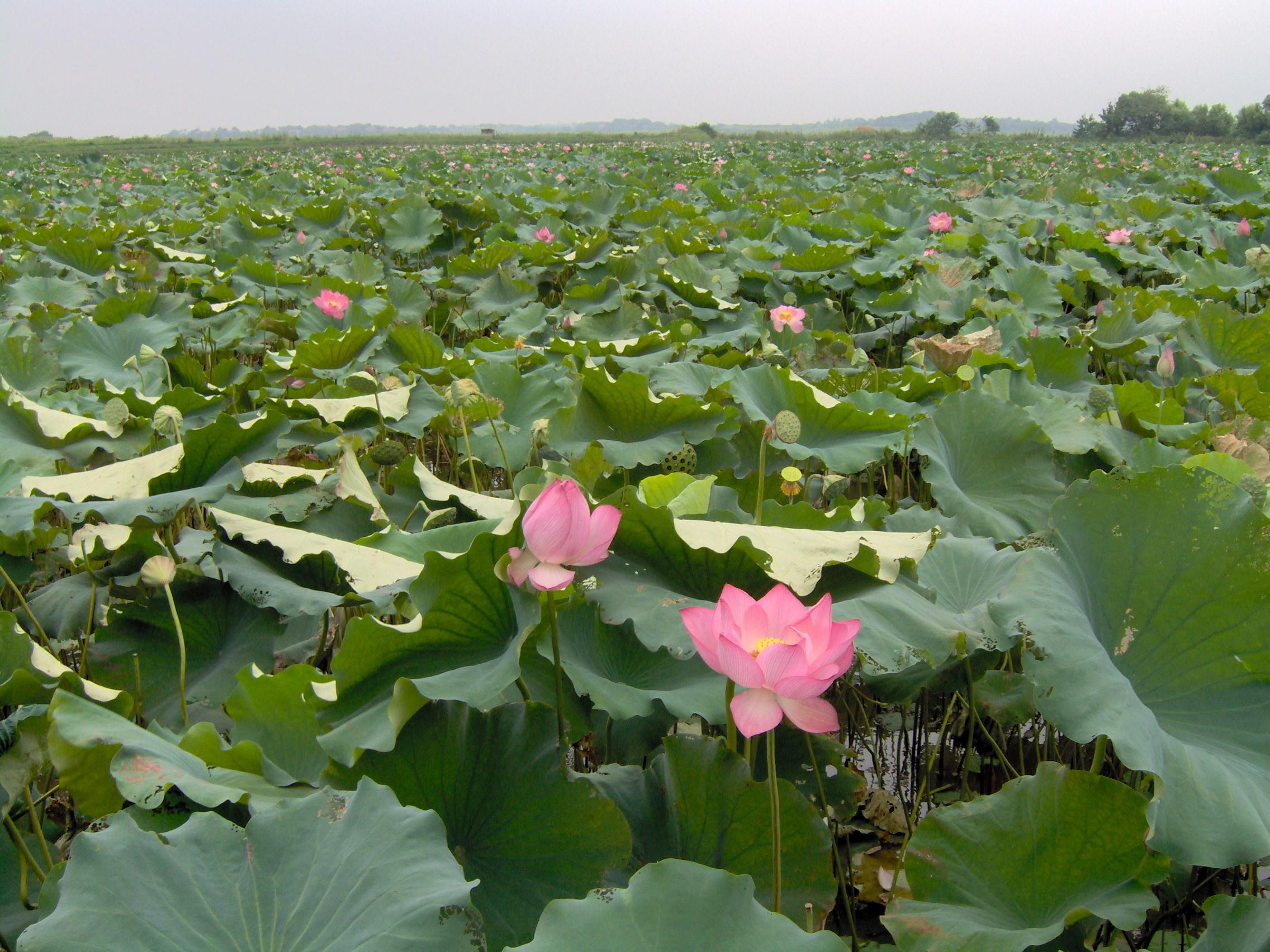
Lotus seeds and roots are a major crop in Hubei, Hunan, Fujian, and Jiangxi provinces

Since 1994, the government has instituted a number of policy changes aimed at limiting grain importation and increasing economic stability. Among these policy changes was the artificial increase of grain prices above market levels. This has led to increased grain production, while placing the heavy burden of maintaining these prices on the government. In 1995, the "Governor's Grain Bag Responsibility System" was instituted, holding provincial governors responsible for balancing grain supply and demand and stabilizing grain prices in their provinces. Later, in 1997, the "Four Separations and One Perfection" program was implemented to relieve some of the monetary burdens placed on the government by its grain policy.

As China continues to industrialize, vast swaths of agricultural land are being converted into industrial land. Farmers displaced by such urban expansion often become migrant labor for factories, but other farmers feel disenfranchised and cheated by the encroachment of industry and the growing disparity between urban and rural wealth and income.

The most recent innovation in Chinese agriculture is a push into organic agriculture. This rapid embrace of organic farming simultaneously serves multiple purposes, including food safety, health benefits, export opportunities, and, by providing price premiums for the produce of rural communities, the adoption of organics can help stem the migration of rural workers to the cities. In the mid-1990s China became a net importer of grain, since its unsustainable practises of groundwater mining has effectively removed considerable land from productive agricultural use.

As of 2023, approximately 40% of China's workforce is engaged in farming, primarily at small scale. Agricultural production accounts for less than 9% of China's GDP.

== Major agricultural products ==
=== Crop distribution ===
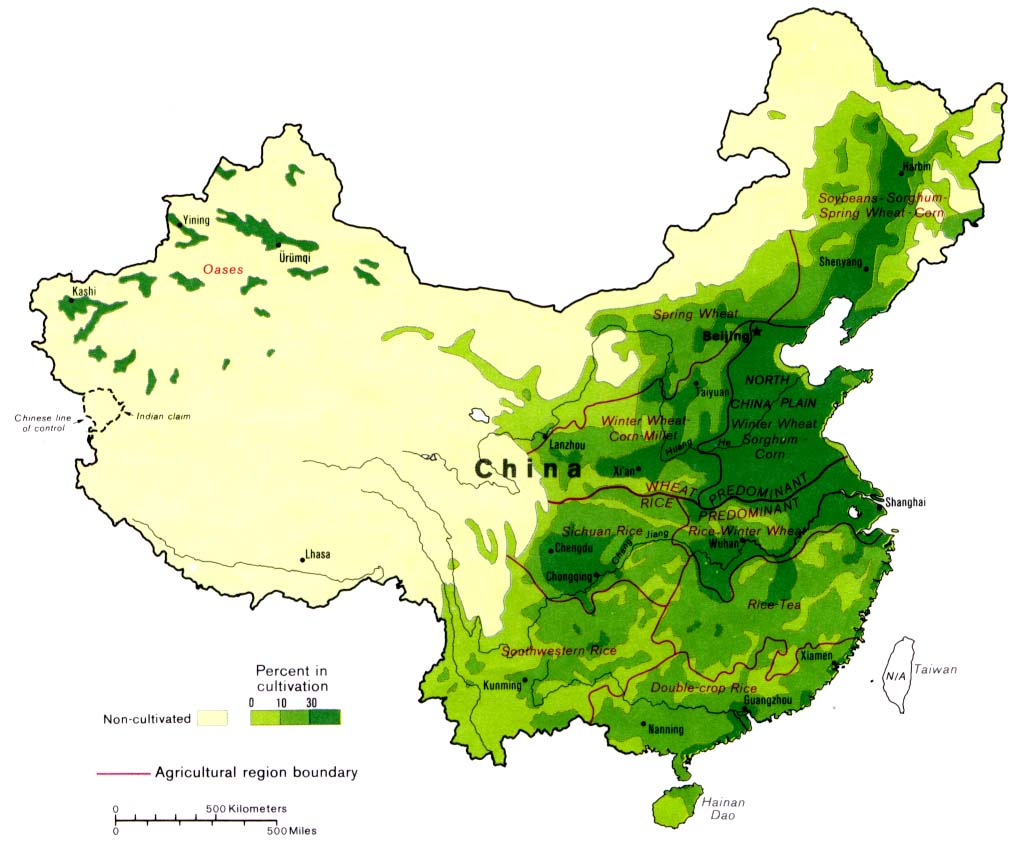
Agricultural regions of Mainland China in 1986

Although China's agricultural output is the largest in the world, only 10% of its total land area can be cultivated. China's arable land, which represents 10% of the total arable land in the world, supports over 20% of the world's population. Of this approximately 1.4 million square kilometers of arable land, only about 1.2% (116,580 square kilometers) permanently supports crops and 525,800 square kilometers are irrigated. The land is divided into approximately 200 million households, with an average land allocation of just 0.65 hectares (1.6 acres).

China's limited space for farming has been a problem throughout its history, leading to chronic food shortage and famine. While the production efficiency of farmland has grown over time, efforts to expand to the west and the north have met with limited success, as such land is generally colder and drier than traditional farmlands to the east. Since the 1950s, farm space has also been pressured by the increasing land needs of industry and cities.

==== Peri-urban agriculture ====
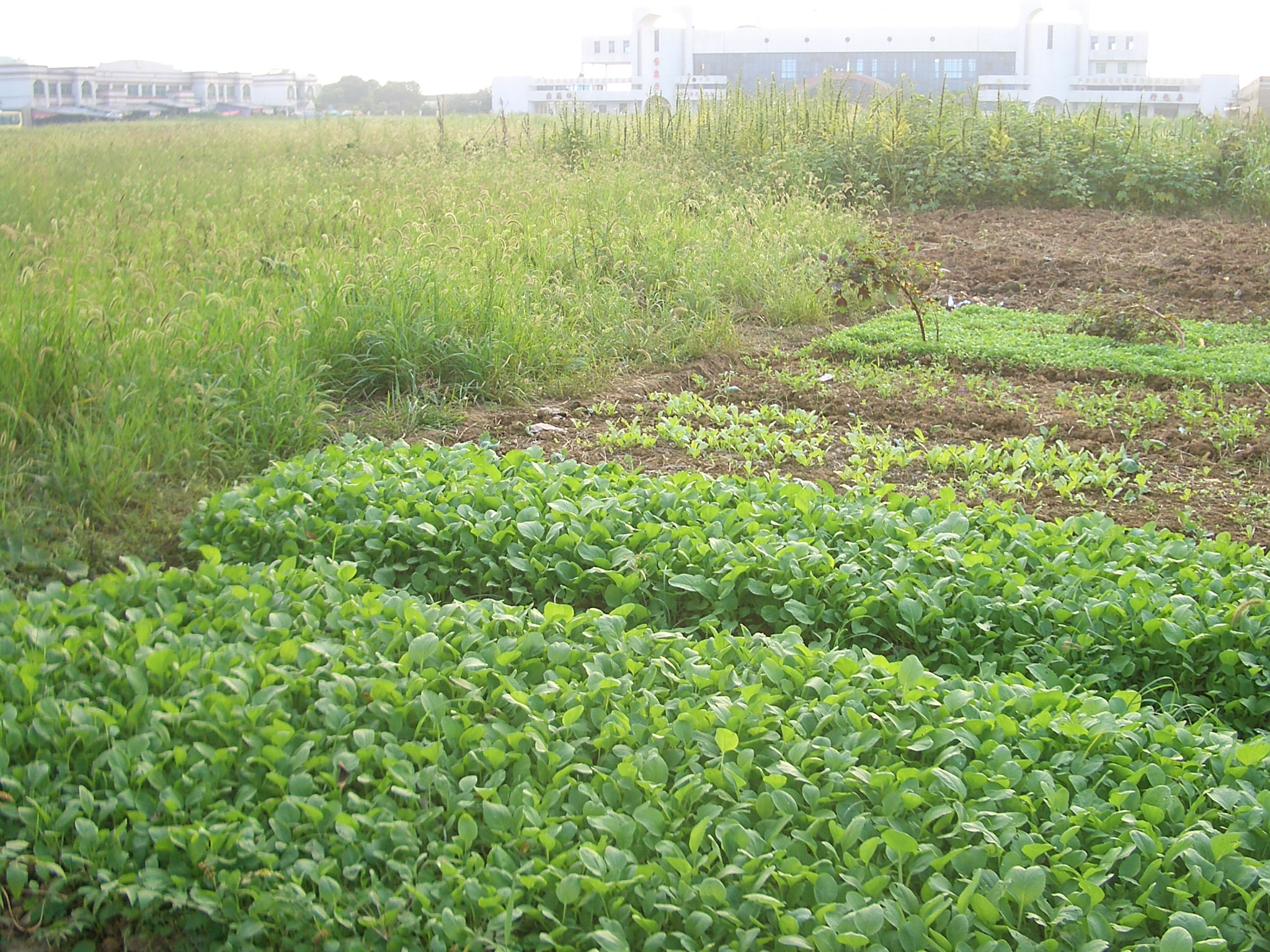
Bok choy-like greens grown in a square outside of Ezhou railway stations

Such increases in the sizes of cities, such as the administrative district of Beijing's increase from 4,822 km^{2} (1,862 sq mi) in 1956 to 16,808 km^{2} (6,490 sq mi) in 1958, has led to the increased adoption of peri-urban agriculture. Such "suburban agriculture" led to more than 70% of non-staple food in Beijing, mainly consisting of vegetables and milk, to be produced by the city itself in the 1960s and 1970s. Recently, with relative food security in China, periurban agriculture has led to improvements in the quality of the food available, as opposed to quantity. One of the more recent experiments in urban agriculture is the Modern Agricultural Science Demonstration Park in Xiaotangshan.

==== Food crops ====
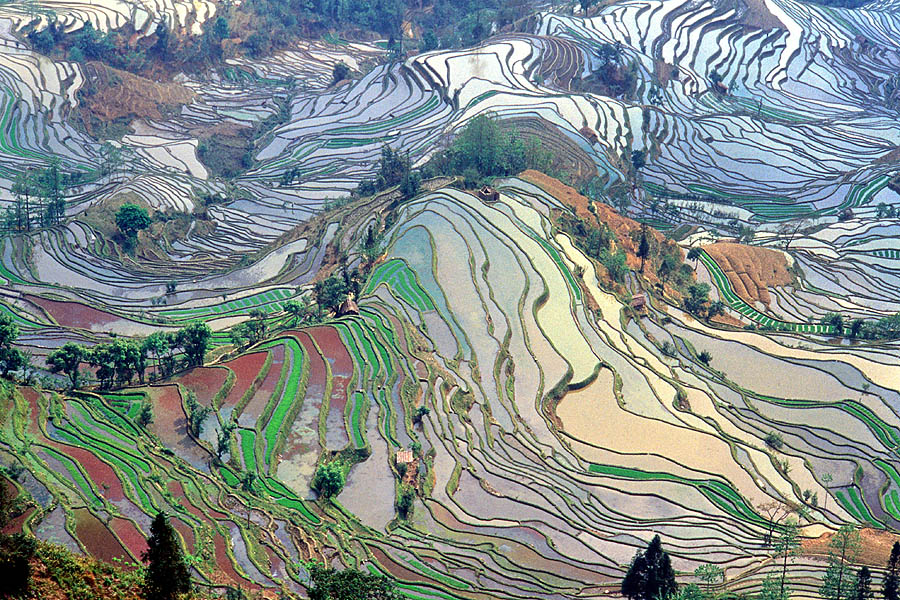
Ancient terraced rice fields in Yuanyang County, Yunnan

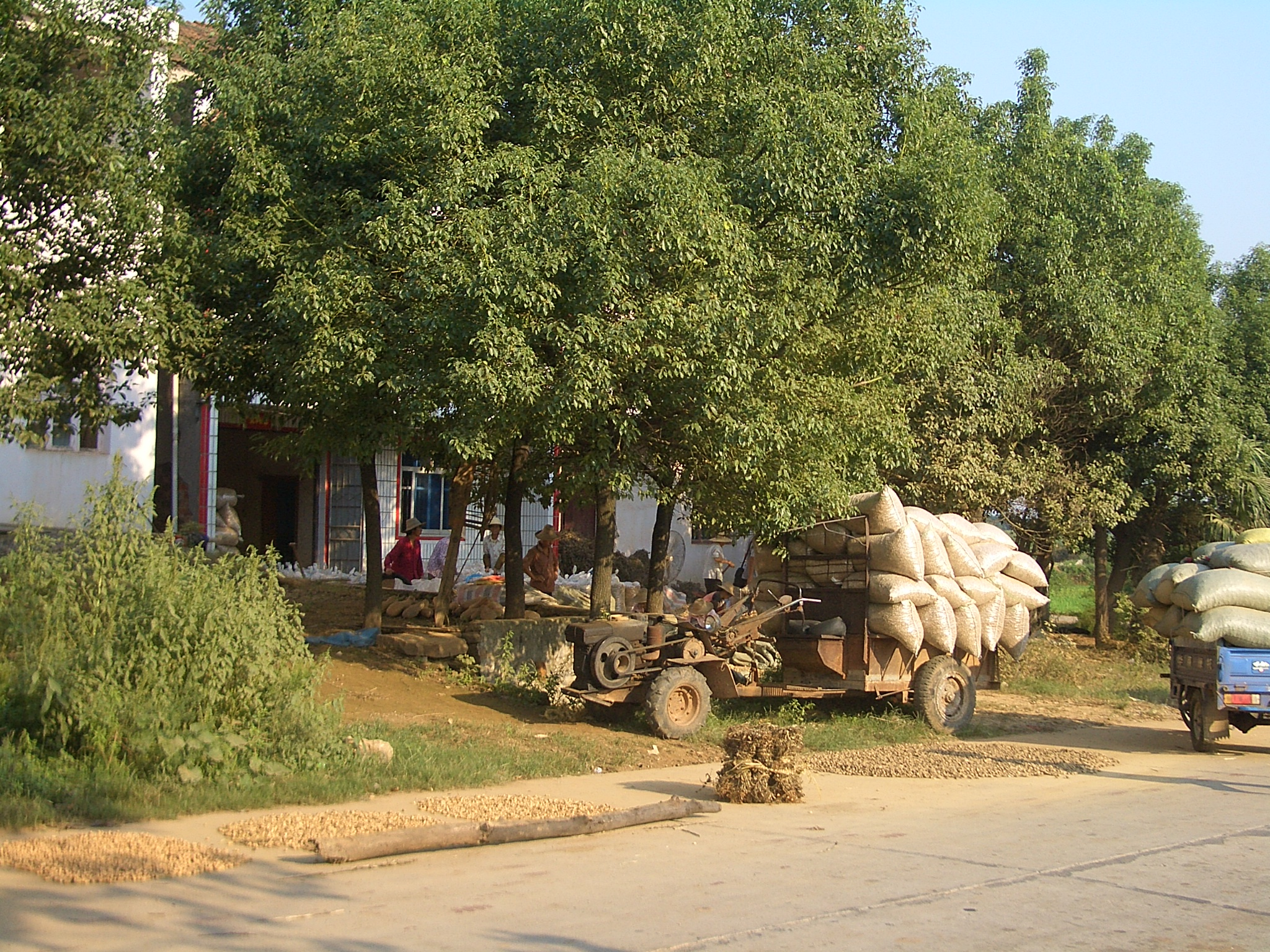
Peanut harvest in Jiangxia, Hubei

About 75% of China's cultivated area is used for food crops. Rice is China's most important crop, raised on about 25% of the cultivated area. The majority of rice is grown south of the Huai River, in the Zhu Jiang delta, and in the Yunnan, Guizhou, and Sichuan provinces.

Wheat is the second most-prevalent grain crop, grown in most parts of the country but especially on the North China Plain, the Wei and Fen River valleys on the Loess plateau, and in Jiangsu, Hubei, and Sichuan provinces. Corn and millet are grown in north and northeast China, and oats are important in Inner Mongolia and Tibet.

Other crops include sweet potatoes in the south, white potatoes in the north (China is the largest producer of potatoes in the world), and various other fruits and vegetables. Tropical fruits are grown on Hainan Island, apples and pears are grown in northern Liaoning and Shandong.

Oil seeds are important in Chinese agriculture, supplying edible and industrial oils and forming a large share of agricultural exports. In North and Northeast China, Chinese soybeans are grown to be used in tofu and cooking oil. China is also a leading producer of peanuts, which are grown in Shandong and Hebei provinces. Other oilseed crops are sesame seeds, sunflower seeds, rapeseed, and the seeds of the tung tree.

Citrus is a major cash crop in southern China, with production scattered along and south of the Yangtze River valley. Mandarins are the most popular citrus in China, with roughly double the output of oranges.

Other important food crops for China include green and jasmine teas (popular among the Chinese population), black tea (as an export), sugarcane, and sugar beets. Tea plantations are located on the hillsides of the middle Yangtze Valley and in the southeast provinces of Fujian and Zhejiang. Sugarcane is grown in Guangdong and Sichuan, while sugar beets are raised in Heilongjiang province and on irrigated land in Inner Mongolia. Lotus is widely cultivated throughout southern China.

Arabica coffee is grown in the southwestern province of Yunnan. Much smaller plantations also exist in Hainan and Fujian.

==== Fiber crops ====
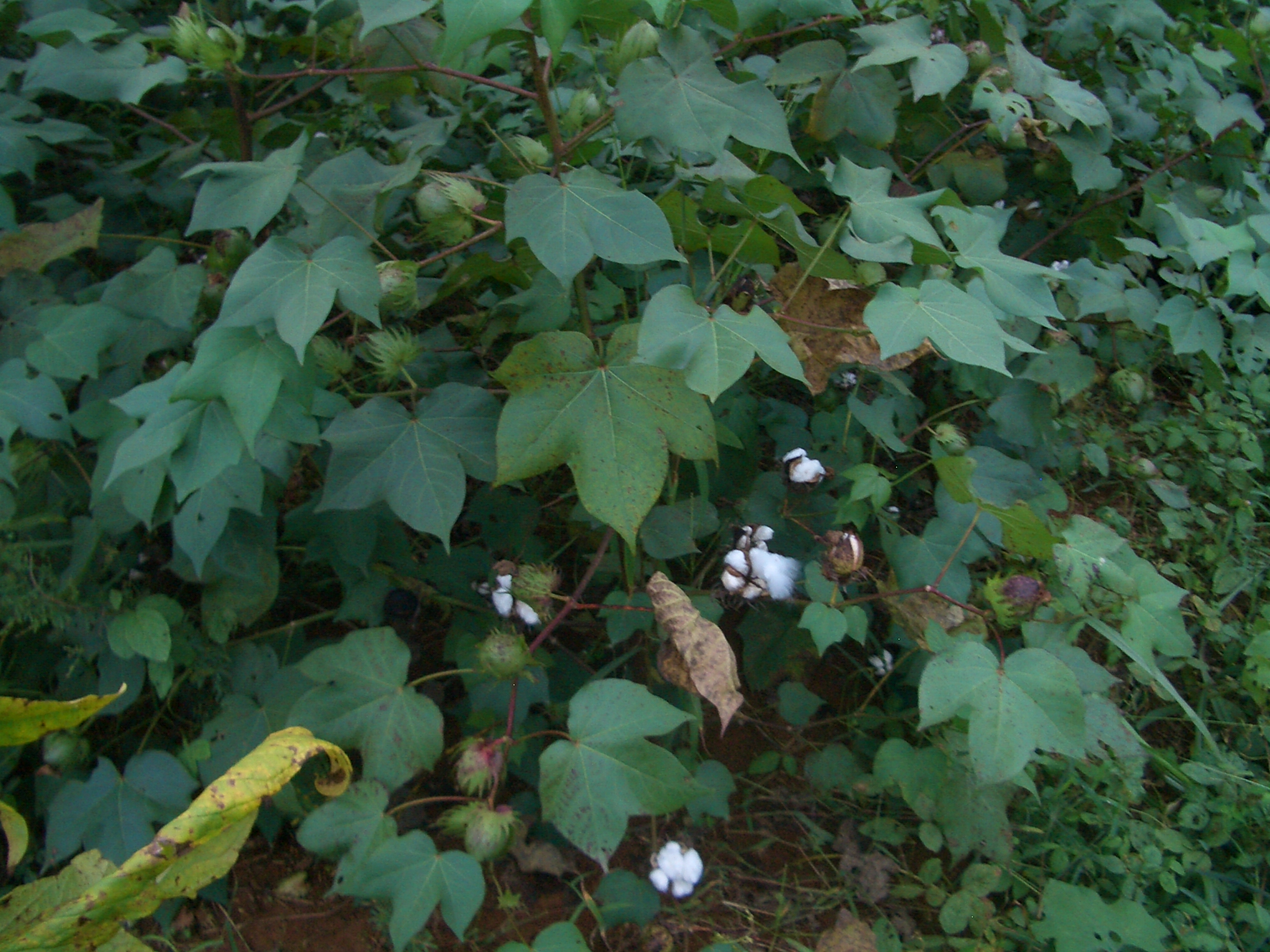
Cotton growing in Yangxin County, Hubei

China is the leading producer of cotton, which is grown throughout, but especially in the areas of the North China Plain, the Yangtze river delta, the middle Yangtze valley, and the Xinjiang Uygur Autonomous Region. Other fiber crops include ramie, flax, jute, and hemp. Sericulture, the practice of silkworm raising, is also practiced in central and southern China.

==== Livestock ====
China has a large livestock population, with pigs and fowls being the most common. China's pig population and pork production mainly lie along the Yangtze River. In 2011, Sichuan province had 51 million pigs (11% of China's total supply). In rural western China, sheep, goats, and camels are raised by nomadic herders. In Tibet, yaks are raised as a source of food, fuel, and shelter. Cattle, water buffalo, horses, mules, and donkeys are also raised in China, and dairy has recently been encouraged by the government, even though approximately 92.3% of the adult population is affected by some level of lactose intolerance.

As demand for gourmet foods grows, production of more exotic meats increases as well. Based on survey data from 684 Chinese turtle farms (less than half of the all 1,499 officially registered turtle farms in the year of the survey, 2002), they sold over 92,000 tons of turtles (around 128 million animals) per year; this is thought to correspond to the industrial total of over 300 million turtles per year.

Increased incomes and increased demand for meat, especially pork, has resulted in demand for improved breeds of livestock, breeding stock imported particularly from the United States. Some of these breeds are adapted to factory farming.

=== Fishing ===
China accounts for about one-third of the total fish production of the world. Aquaculture, the breeding of fish in ponds and lakes, accounts for more than half of its output. The principal aquaculture-producing regions are close to urban markets in the middle and lower Yangtze valley and the Zhu Jiang delta.

== Production ==
In its first fifty years, the People's Republic of China greatly increased agricultural production through organizational and technological improvements. As of at least 2022, China produces almost all of its own food and non-soybean feed.

	Crop	1949 Output (tons)	1978 Output (tons)	1999 Output (tons)
1.	Grain	113,180,000	304,770,000	508,390,000
2.	Cotton	444,000	2,167,000	3,831,000
3.	Oil-bearing crops	2,564,000	5,218,000	26,012,000
4.	Sugarcane	2,642,000	21,116,000	74,700,000
5.	Sugarbeet	191,000	2,702,000	8,640,000
6.	Flue-cured tobacco	43,000	1,052,000	2,185,000
7.	Tea	41,000	268,000	676,000
8.	Fruit	1,200,000	6,570,000	62,376,000
9.	Meat	2,200,000	8,563,000	59,609,000
10.	Aquatic products	450,000	4,660,000	41,220,000

As of 2011, China was both the world's largest producer and consumer of agricultural products. However, the researcher Lin Erda has stated a projected fall of possibly 14% to 23% by 2050 due to water shortages and other impacts by climate change; China has increased the budget for agriculture by 20% in 2009, and continues to support energy efficiency measures, renewable technology, and other efforts with investments, such as the over 30% green component of the $586bn fiscal stimulus package announced in November 2008.

In 2018:

- It was the 2nd largest producer of maize (257.1 million tons), after the United States;
- It was the largest producer of rice (212.1 million tons);
- It was the largest producer of wheat (131.4 million tons);
- It was the 3rd largest producer of sugarcane (108 million tons), after Brazil and India;
- It was the largest producer of potato (90.2 million tons);
- It was the largest producer of watermelon (62.8 million tons);
- It was the largest producer of tomatoes (61.5 million tons);
- It was the largest producer of cucumber / pickles (56.2 million tons);
- It was the largest producer of sweet potato (53.0 million tons);
- It was the largest producer of apple (39.2 million tons);
- It was the largest producer of eggplant (34.1 million tons);
- It was the largest producer of cabbage (33.1 million tons);
- It was the largest producer of onion (24.7 million tons);
- It was the largest producer of spinach (23.8 million tons);
- It was the largest producer of garlic (22.2 million tons);
- It was the largest producer of green bean (19.9 million tons);
- It was the largest producer of tangerine (19.0 million tons);
- It was the largest producer of carrots (17.9 million tons);
- It was the 3rd largest producer of cotton (17.7 million tons), after India and the United States;
- It was the largest producer of peanut (17.3 million tons);
- It was the largest producer of pear (16.0 million tons);
- It was the 4th largest producer of soy (14.1 million tons), after the United States, Brazil and Argentina;
- It was the largest producer of grape (13.3 million tons);
- It was the 2nd largest producer of rapeseed (13.2 million tons), after Canada;
- It was the largest producer of pea (12.9 million tons);
- It was the largest producer of melon (12.7 million tons);
- It was the 8th largest producer of sugar beet (12 million tons), which serves to produce sugar and ethanol;
- It was the 2nd largest producer of banana (11.2 million tons), after India;
- It was the largest producer of cauliflower and broccoli (10.6 million tons);
- It was the 2nd largest producer of orange (9.1 million tons), after Brazil;
- It was the largest producer of pumpkin (8.1 million tons);
- It was the largest producer of asparagus (7.9 million tons);
- It was the largest producer of plum (6.7 million tons);
- It was the largest producer of mushroom and truffle (6.6 million tons);
- It was the largest producer of grapefruit (4.9 million tons);
- It was the 15th largest producer of cassava (4.9 million tons);
- It was the 2nd largest producer of mango (including mangosteen and guava) (4.8 million tons), after India;
- It was the largest producer of persimmon (3.0 million tons);
- It was the largest producer of strawberry (2.9 million tons);
- It was the largest producer of tea (2.6 million tons);
- It produced 2.5 million tons of sunflower seed;
- It was the 3rd largest producer of lemon (2.4 million tons), after India and Mexico;
- It was the largest producer of tobacco (2.2 million tons);
- It was the 8th largest producer of sorghum (2.1 million tons);
- It was the largest producer of kiwi (2.0 million tons);
- It was the largest producer of chestnut (1.9 million tons);
- It produced 1.9 million tons of taro;
- It produced 1.8 million tons of fava beans;
- It was the 3rd largest producer of millet (1.5 million tons), after India and Niger;
- It was the 8th largest producer of pineapple (1.5 million tons);
- It produced 1.4 million tons of barley;
- It was the largest producer of buckwheat (1.1 million tons);
- It was the 6th largest producer of oats (1 million tons);
- It was the 4th largest producer of rye (1 million tons), after Germany, Poland and Russia;
- It produced 1 million tons of tallow tree;

In addition to smaller productions of other agricultural products.

== Challenges ==
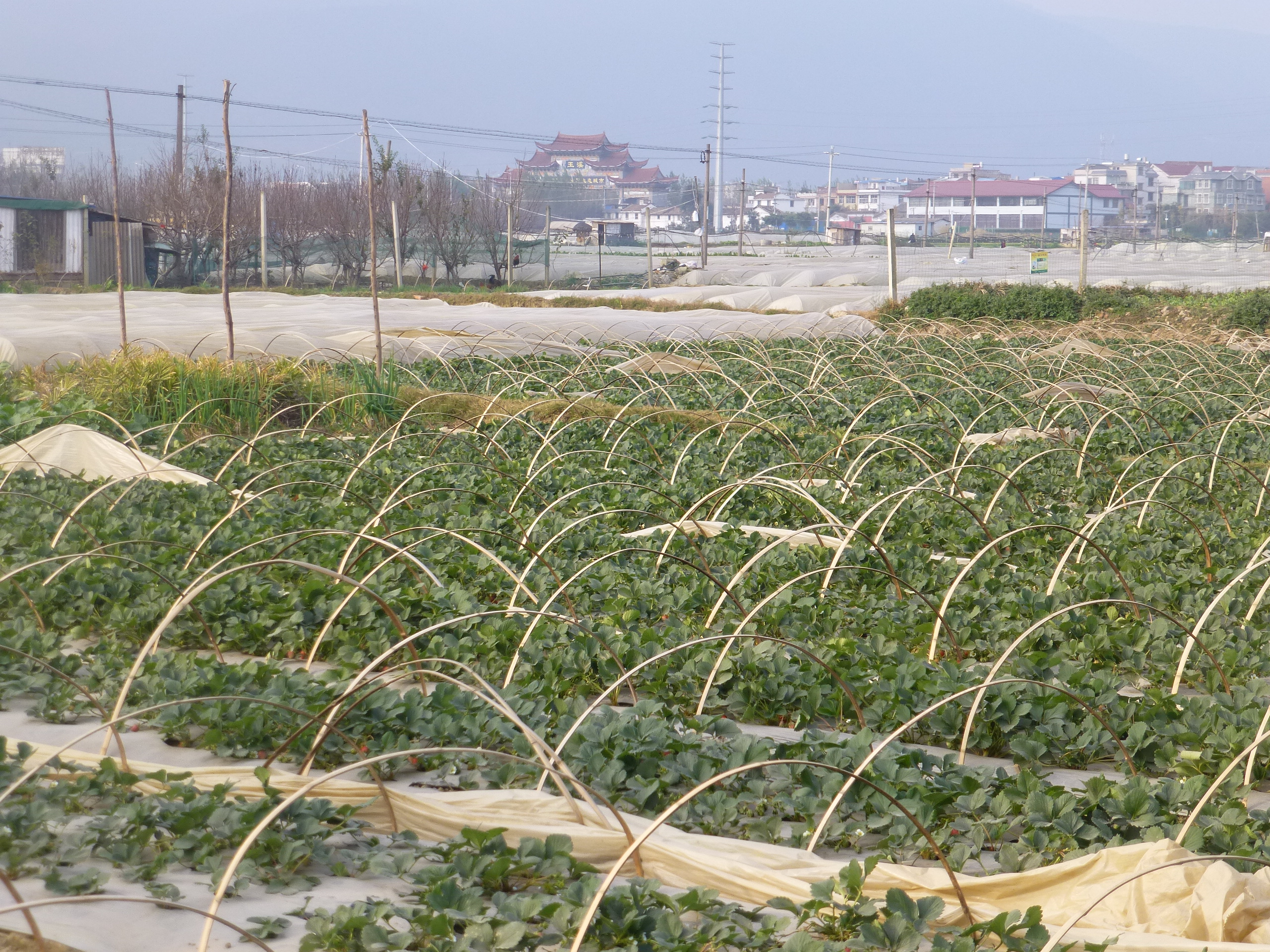
Strawberry fields in Yuxi, Yunnan

Throughout China's history, its relative lack of arable land has been a challenge. China has about 22% of the world population, but must feed it with only 9% of the world's arable land. China's water resources are likewise limited, as it has only 6% of the world's water supply.

=== Inefficiencies in the agricultural market ===
Despite rapid growth in output, the Chinese agricultural sector still faces several challenges. Farmers in several provinces, such as Shandong, Zhejiang, Anhui, Liaoning, and Xinjiang often have a hard time selling their agricultural products to customers due to a lack of information about current conditions.

Between the producing farmer in the countryside and the end-consumer in the cities there is a chain of intermediaries. Because a lack of information flows through them, farmers find it difficult to foresee the demand for different types of fruits and vegetables. In order to maximize their profits they, therefore, opt to produce those fruits and vegetables that created the highest revenues for farmers in the region in the previous year. If, however, most farmers do so, this causes the supply of fresh products to fluctuate substantially year on year. Relatively scarce products in one year are produced in excess the following year because of expected higher profit margins. The resulting excess supply, however, forces farmers to reduce their prices and sell at a loss. The scarce, revenue creating products of one year become the over-abundant, loss-making products in the following, and vice versa.

Efficiency is further impaired in the transportation of agricultural products from the farms to the actual markets. According to figures from the Commerce Department, up to 25% of fruits and vegetables rot before being sold, compared to around 5% in a typical developed country. As intermediaries cannot sell these rotten fruits they pay farmers less than they would if able to sell all or most of the fruits and vegetables. This reduces farmer's revenues although the problem is caused by post-production inefficiencies, which they are not themselves aware of during price negotiations with intermediaries.

These information and transportation problems highlight inefficiencies in the market mechanisms between farmers and end-consumers, impeding farmers from taking advantage of the fast development of the rest of the Chinese economy. The resulting small profit margin does not allow them to invest in the necessary agricultural inputs (machinery, seeds, fertilizers, etc.) to raise their productivity and improve their standards of living, from which the whole of the Chinese economy would benefit. This in turn increases the exodus of people from the countryside to the cities, which already face urbanization issues.

In a speech in September 2020, General Secretary of the Chinese Communist Party Xi Jinping directed China's scientists to research seed farming. He noted that the country relies on imported seed and said that its scientists must help remedy this situation.

=== Climate change ===
In the years 1970-2016 the occurrence of crop pest and diseases increased 4 times. 22% of that rise are due to climate change. By the year 2100 the occurrence will rise 243% under a low emission scenario and by 460% under a high emissions scenario. China is the biggest producer of wheat and rice in the world. It is in the second place in maize production.The negative effects of climate change on China's agriculture have become increasingly evident. Climate change has increased the frequency and severity of heat stress and drought, contributing to greater variability in agricultural production and affecting crop yields and quality. Future climate change is projected to reduce the yields of major crops, including wheat, rice, and maize, and to alter the geographic distribution of agricultural production.

China is also facing agricultural challenges associated with the global demand for commodities such as soybeans. China's growing soybean imports have been linked to land-use change and environmental impacts in major producing countries, particularly in South America, illustrating the transnational environmental effects of agricultural commodity trade. Over the past 70 years, climate change seriously reduced China's food security. Although rising annual temperatures can accelerate crop growth and potentially increase food production, climate change in China has reduced sunshine duration and made rainfall more irregular, increasing the likelihood of climate-related disasters such as drought and flooding. Flooding decreased the yields of rice by 8% over the last 20 years. As China is the biggest food producer and importer in the world, what happens in the agricultural sector of China has an immediate effect on the global food system. China increased its grain self sufficiency by expanding agriculture areas to regions with less rain, giving them water with irrigation systems. Now those fields are at risk from water shortage while the irrigation systems demand huge amounts of water what cause depletion of groundwater in many regions. The government of China is trying to address the problem by different measures like reducing food waste, increasing international cooperation. But some of the measures like using more fertilizers produced from coal can exacerbate the problem.

== International trade ==
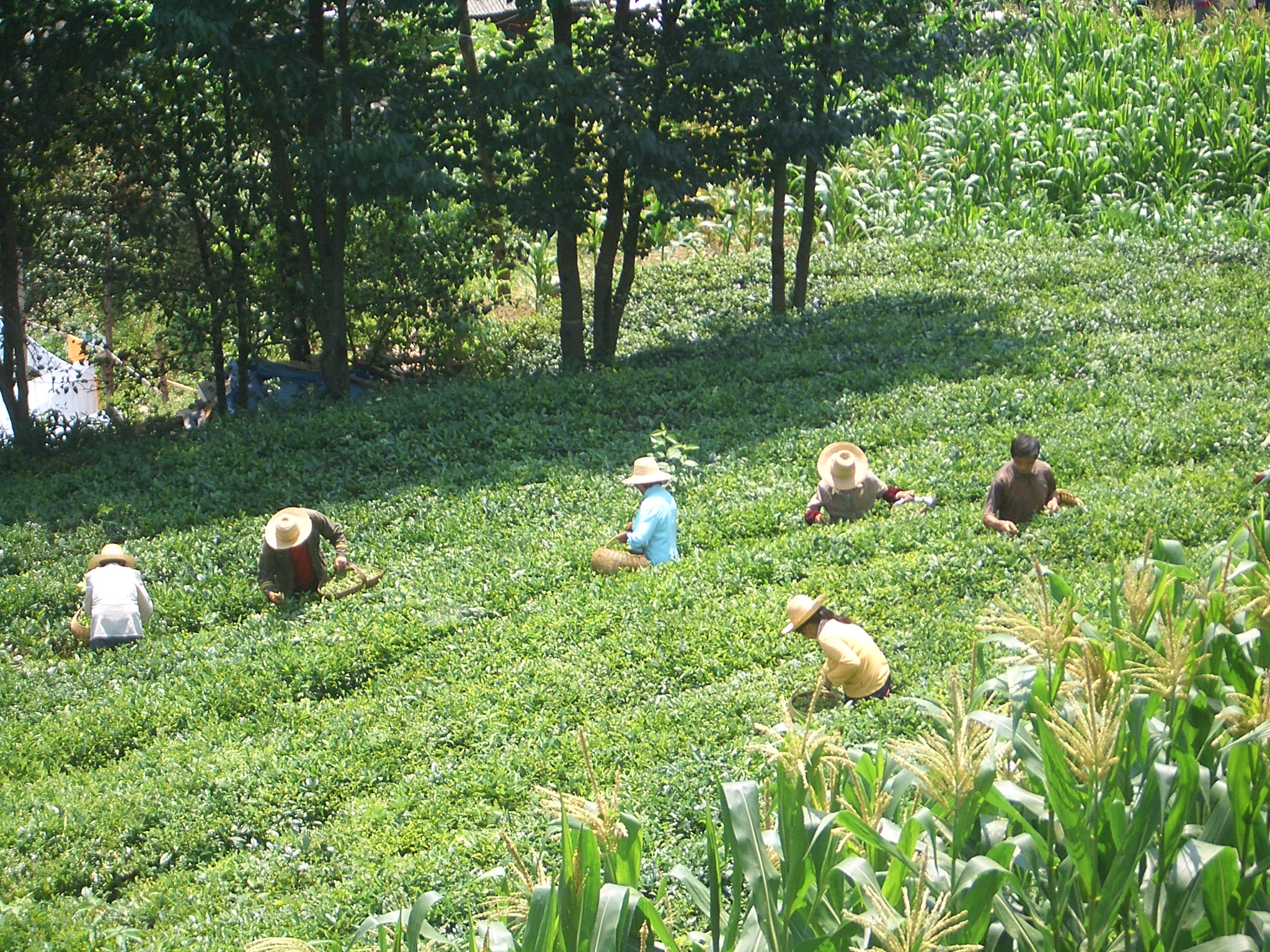
Tea leaves harvested in Muyu, Shennongjia Forest District, Hubei

China is the world's largest importer of soybeans and other food crops, and is expected to become the top importer of farm products within the next decade. In a speech in September 2020, CCP leader Xi Jinping lamented the country's reliance on imported seed.

While most years China's agricultural production is sufficient to feed the country, in down years, China has to import grain. Due to the shortage of available farm land and an abundance of labor, it might make more sense to import land-extensive crops (such as wheat and rice) and to save China's scarce cropland for high-value export products, such as fruits, nuts, or vegetables. In order to maintain grain independence and ensure food security, however, the Chinese government has enforced policies that encourage grain production at the expense of more-profitable crops. Despite heavy restrictions on crop production, China's agricultural exports have greatly increased in recent years.

=== Governmental influence ===
One important motivator of increased international trade was China's inclusion in the World Trade Organization (WTO) on December 11, 2001, leading to reduced or eliminated tariffs on much of China's agricultural exports. Due to the resulting opening of international markets to Chinese agriculture, by 2004 the value of China's agricultural exports exceeded $17.3 billion (US). Since China's inclusion in the WTO, its agricultural trade has not been liberalized to the same extent as its manufactured goods trade. Markets within China are still relatively closed-off to foreign companies. Due to its large and growing population, it is speculated that if its agricultural markets were opened, China would become a consistent net importer of food, possibly destabilizing the world food market. The barriers enforced by the Chinese government on grains are not transparent because China's state trading in grains is conducted through its Cereal, Oil, and Foodstuffs Importing and Exporting Corporation (COFCO).

=== Food safety ===
In the early 2000s, excessive pesticide residues, low food hygiene, unsafe additives, contamination with heavy metals and other contaminants and misuse of veterinary drugs had led to trade restrictions with some nations such as Japan, the United States, and the European Union. These problems have also led to public outcry, such as in the melamine-tainted dog food scare and the carcinogenic-tainted seafood import restriction, leading to measures such as the "China-free" label. In the milk scandal in China in 2008, many children became ill due to consumption of melamine-contaminated milk products, and a number of domestic dairy brands were found to contain melamine in their products, leading many countries to ban the import of Chinese dairy products.

In 2011, About one tenth of China's farmland is contaminated with heavy metals, according to the Ministry of Environmental Protection of the People's Republic of China.

=== Organic food products ===
China has developed a Green Food program where produce is certified for low pesticide input. This has been articulated into Green food Grade A and Grade AA. This Green Food AA standard has been aligned with IFOAM international standards for organic farming and has formed the basis of the rapid expansion of organic agriculture in China.

China's organic food production has experienced a rapid expansion in the 2010s, largely attributed to the booming domestic market due to the heightened food safety problem. China is now a global leader in organic agriculture:

- China is fourth in the world for certified organic hectares with 3,589,807 hectares.
- China is the third largest retail market for organic food.
- China is the world leader for organic cereal hectares.
- China is the world leader for organic aquaculture.

In many cases, organic food production is organized by organic food companies leasing land from small scale farmers. Farmers' cooperatives and contract farming are also found to be common organizational structures of organic farming in China. The Chinese government has provided various policy and financial supports for the development of the organic sector. In recent years, non-certified organic production in diverse forms such as permaculture and natural farming is also emerging in China, often initiated by entrepreneurs or civil society organizations.

== See also ==
- History of China
- History of agriculture
- Population history of China
- History of canals in China
- Lettuce production in China
- China Green Food Development Center
- Peak water#China
- Wang Zhen (official)
- Franklin Hiram King
- Land use in the People's Republic of China
- Aquaculture in China
- Women in agriculture in China
