= Potato production in China =

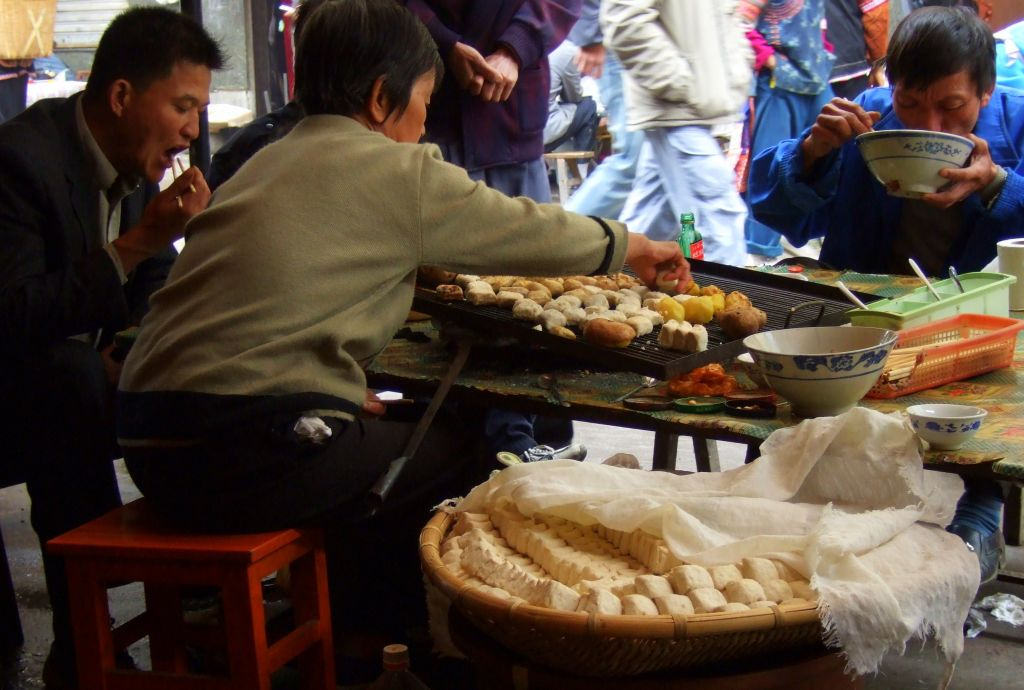
Hard tofu and potatoes being grilled at a street stall in Yuanyang, Yunnan, China

China is the world's largest producer of potatoes, generating more than 22 percent of global potato production. The potato is the only crop that can be grown in all regions of China, although cultivation predominantly takes place in the northern and southern regions of the country.

== History ==
The potato was introduced to China from the New World during the late Ming dynasty, but only started being promoted as a staple food during the 20th century.

Potato production in China had already been on the rise in the 1960s and early 1970s, following the Great Chinese Famine. A dramatic surge in the production of potatoes in 1993 against a slump in European output propelled China to the forefront of the international potato production scene. The tremendous surge of potato production during the 1990s has been credited to technological advancements. 21st-century production of potatoes in China has fallen considerably though, largely due to growth sites becoming less suitable and hence diminishing the sustainability of potato cultivation, alongside the increasing prioritisation of other crops and produce over potatoes. Efforts from 2004 onwards started to focus on the organic production of potatoes; the first organic potato enterprise originated in Heilongjiang, while Wuchuan County, which has good water, weather and a culture of using organic fertilisers, is the largest of all the organic potato producers in China.

In a speech in 2015, China's vice minister of agriculture Yu Xinrong said "Hunger breeds discontentment. … The development of the potato industry and the consumption of potatoes as a staple food is an important step in China’s agricultural development". Since 2015 government policy promotes the use of the potato as a staple food, using potato flour as a substitute for wheat flour and promoting the use of potato in traditional dishes.

== Production ==
Potato, raw, with skin
Nutritional value per 100 g (3.5 oz)
- Energy: 321 kJ (77 kcal)
- Carbohydrates: 17.47 g
- Starch: 15.44 g
- Dietary fiber: 2.2 g
- Fat: 0.1 g
- Protein: 2 g
Vitamins and minerals
Vitamins	Quantity %DV^{†}
Thiamine (B1)	7% 0.08 mg
Riboflavin (B2)	2% 0.03 mg
Niacin (B3)	7% 1.05 mg
Pantothenic acid (B5)	6% 0.296 mg
Vitamin B6	17% 0.295 mg
Folate (B9)	4% 16 μg
Vitamin C	22% 19.7 mg
Vitamin E	0% 0.01 mg
Vitamin K	2% 1.9 μg
Minerals	Quantity %DV^{†}
Calcium	1% 12 mg
Iron	4% 0.78 mg
Magnesium	5% 23 mg
Manganese	7% 0.153 mg
Phosphorus	5% 57 mg
Potassium	14% 421 mg
Sodium	0% 6 mg
Zinc	3% 0.29 mg
- Other constituents: Quantity
- Water: 75 g
- Link to USDA Database entry
- ^{†}Percentages estimated using US recommendations for adults, except for potassium, which is estimated based on expert recommendation from the National Academies

The potato is a tuber crop which has high nutritional value. It has protein, calcium and vitamin C. One potato of medium size contains 50 percent of the daily vitamin C needs of an adult. When boiled, its protein content is reported to be more than that of maize, with double the calcium content.

The potato is the only crop that is plantable in all regions of China, although the country has four main potato-planting regions: North China (Heilongjiang, Jilin, Liaoning, Inner Mongolia, Hebei, Shanxi, Shaanxi, Ningxia, Gansu, Qinghai and Xinjiang), which makes up around 47 percent of the total planting area in the country; Central China (Liaoning, Hebei, Shanxi, Shaanxi, Hubei, Hunan, Henan, Shandong, Jiangsu, Zhejiang, Anhui and Jiangxi), contributing towards 7 percent of the total planting area; South China (Guangxi, Guangdong, Hainan, Fujian and Taiwan), 8 percent; and Southwest China (Yunnan, Guizhou, Sichuan, Chongqing, Tibet, Hubei and Hunan), 38 percent.

Based on data by the Food and Agriculture Organization (FAO), the actual planted area of potatoes in 2006 was 4,900,000 hectares (12,000,000 acres), or about 26.14 percent of the total global planted area. The total production of potatoes in China was over 70,000,000 tonnes (77,000,000 tons), or more than 22 percent of the global potato production, making China the largest potato producer in the world. However, the average yield of potatoes in China was 14.35 tons/ha, compared to the global mean of 16.74 tons/ha.

Over the past decade, the planted area of potatoes in China has been growing because of the important role of potatoes in poverty reduction and food security, not to mention the greater economic returns of selling potatoes vis-a-vis other crops. The total planted area in 2006 was 5,020,000 hectares (12,400,000 acres), notwithstanding the planted areas in Shandong, Henan, Zhejiang and Guangxi. Additionally, the planted area in the winter-fallow land parcels in certain subtropical and tropical regions of the country has been growing by the year due to the increased profitability of selling potatoes during the winter; for instance, the planted area of potatoes in the Guangxi Autonomous Region rose from 30,000 hectares (74,000 acres) to 130,000 hectares (320,000 acres) from around 2001 to 2006.

Apart from sub-par seed qualities and economic expectations, pests and fungal diseases, including late blight, have devastatingly limited the production of potatoes in China; this, however, has prompted intense research on ways to combat them.

== Culture ==
=== Cuisine ===
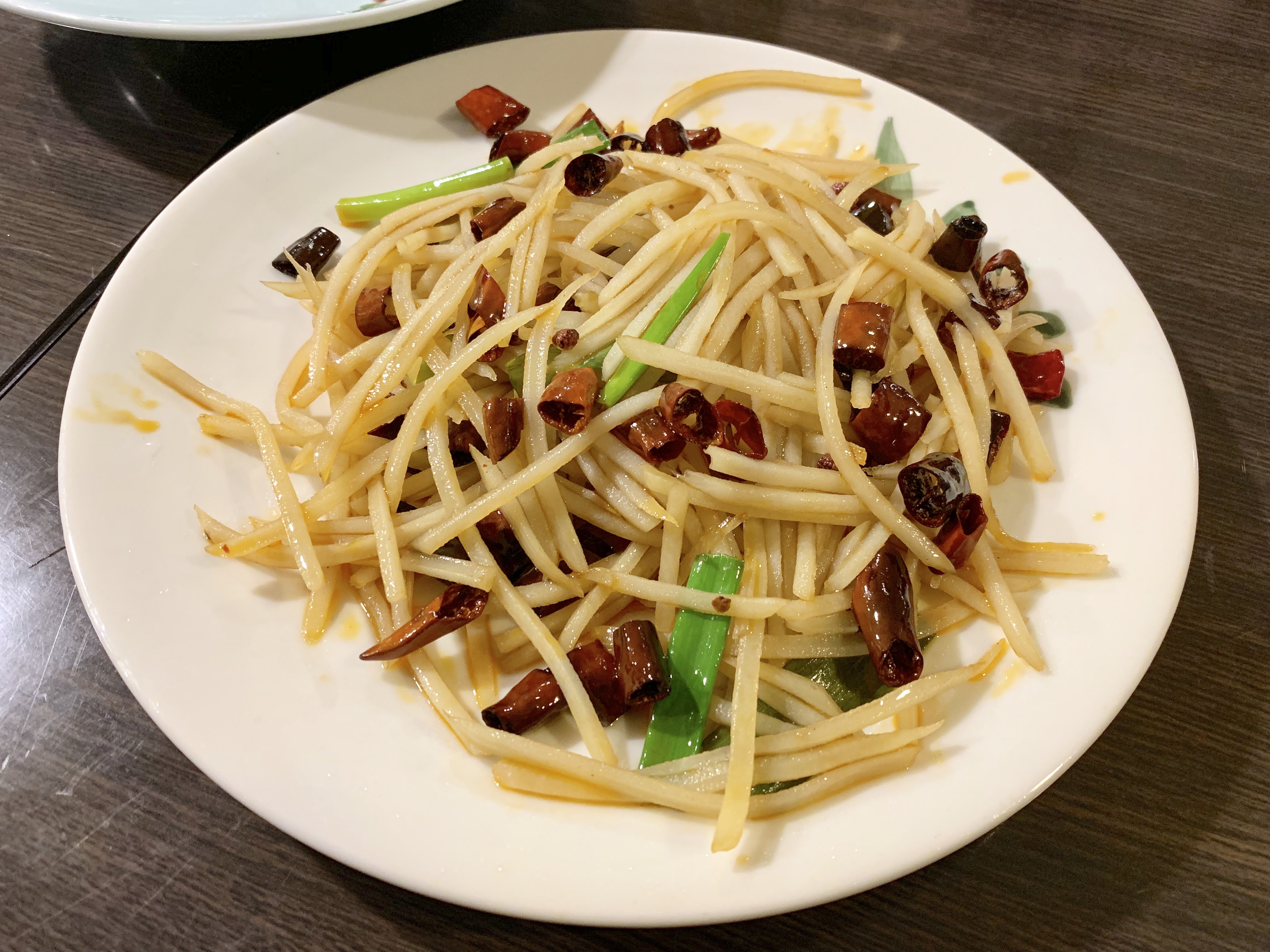
Shredded stir-fried potatoes (土豆丝)

Potatoes have historically not been an integral part of the Chinese diet. In Chinese cuisine, potatoes are used as a vegetable and not as staple carbs.

Potatoes in China are also increasingly being used to make potato crisps and french fries, especially with the country's burgeoning fast food and processed food industries.

=== Language ===
The name given to the potato differs by region. In Northeast China they are called 土豆; tudou, in Northern China they are called 山药蛋; shānyào dàn, in Northwest China they are called 洋芋; yángyù, in Zhejiang and Jiangsu they are called 番芋; fānyù, in Cantonese they are called 薯仔; syu4 zai2 and in Taiwan, Malaysia and Singapore 馬鈴薯; 马铃薯; mǎlíngshǔ is most commonly used.

== See also ==
- Agriculture in China

== Bibliography ==
- "The rise of Asia as the center of global potato production and some implications for industry" (PDF). Journal of Potatoes. 39 (1): 1–22.
