= China Green Food Development Center =

Chinese food standards agency

China Green Food Development Center logo

The China Green Food Development Center (Chinese: 中国绿色食品发展中心; abbreviated CGFDC) is the first agency in the People's Republic of China to oversee organic food standards. The center was established in November 1992 under the jurisdiction of the Ministry of Agriculture of the People's Republic of China. The CGFDC joined the International Federation of Organic Agriculture Movements (IFOAM)in 1993. It is headquartered in Beijing, where its general office and divisions of logo management, authentication, sci-tech and standards, planning and finance, and international cooperation are located. Currently, the CGFDC has set up 42 local food regulatory agencies, commissioned 38 quality inspection agencies, and 71 green food producing environmental monitoring branches. Its basic purpose is to promote the development of food that prioritizes safety, to protect the environment, and to maintain the development of economy and society. Its main responsibilities include: developing Green Food generation policies; regulating organizations that develop green food standards; organizing and guiding the development and management of Green Food; trademark green logo management; review and approval of green flag products; and organizing research, technology promotion, training, advocacy, information services, green building demonstration bases, and foreign economic and technological exchanges and cooperation. The CGFDC's main partners consist of China Organic Food Certification Center (abbreviated COFCC), State Food and Nutrition Consultant Committee, Food and Agricultural Organization of the United Nations and Development Research Center of the State Council as well as some media networks as supporters. It has published reports including the " Green Food Products Bulletin","Green Fashion", and "Brief Report of the Center."

The CGFDC oversees two Green Food Standards: A (which allows some use of synthetic agricultural chemicals) and AA (which is more stringent, allowing less use of such chemicals, and is consequently less popular with agricultural producers). Both standards focus on the end product rather than the process, and do not generally monitor actual use of agricultural chemicals, preferring instead to test the products themselves for chemical residues. Green Food thus provides farmers with a steeped path way from chemical farming, to Green Food Grade A through to organic certification. Also, the China Green Food Development Center demonstrates the genesis of Green Food: "China's Green Food development is the outcome of actively exploring new ways of food production and consumption based on China's own situation and in line with the international trend of sustainable development. The statistics show an increase of 7 percent of green food enterprises which up to 6400 compared with the data of 2009 from the China Green Food Development Center.And the China's Green Food has launched high quality through the supervising of CGFDC.

== Labeling ==
Food certified under Green Food is labeled with the Green Food-logo both in Chinese and English. It also carries a twelve digit LB-number which makes it traceable and able to verify its authenticity.

== See also ==
- Agriculture in China
- Organic certification
- Organic farming
- China Green Agriculture
