= China Green Agriculture =

China Green Agriculture, Inc.
- Native name: 中国绿色农业公司
- Formerly: Yangling Jinong Humic Acid Product Co. Ltd
- Founded: July 1998 in Yangling District, China
- Headquarters: Xi'an, China
- Key people: Zhuoyu Li, President and CEO; Min Li, General Manager; Xianglan Li, General Engineer; Yumin Liu, Technical Director; Yu Hao, Financial Manager
- Number of employees: Over 600 (2015)
- Website: www.cgagri.com

China Green Agriculture, Inc. (Chinese: 中国绿色农业公司; NYSE: CGA) is based in Xi'an, China. It became the first Chinese company listed on the New York Stock Exchange market. It is also the first Chinese company to list on NYSE Euronext markets in 2009. It became a public company in 2008. China Green Agriculture produces and distributes humic acid based liquid compound fertilizer. Mr. Zhuoyu Li is the chief executive officer of China Green Agriculture.

== History ==
China Green Agriculture was incorporated on February 8, 1987, through its indirect wholly owned subsidiaries, TechTeam Jinong Humic Acid Product Co., Ltd. (Techteam) and Xi’an Jintai Agriculture Technology Development Company (Jintai), is engaged in research, development, manufacture and distribution of humic acid organic liquid compound fertilizer in 27 provinces in China. Humic acid is an essential natural, organic ingredient for a balanced, fertile soil, and it is one of the major constituents of organic matter. Techteam has automated humic acid production lines in China. It has a multi-tiered line of 119 fertilizer products. Techteam's wholly owned subsidiary, Jintai, was formed for researching and developing humic acid fertilizers. In the process of testing Techteam's fertilizers, it produces agricultural products, including flowers, vegetables, and colored seedlings, which are sold to middle and high-end consumers across China.

== Business segments ==
China Green Agriculture has two business segments: the research, development, production and distribution of humic acid organic liquid compound fertilizer, and the development, production and distribution of agricultural products, such as fruits, vegetables, flowers and colored seedlings. The fertilizer business is China Green Agriculture's main business, which generated 83% of its total revenues during the fiscal year ended June 30, 2008 (fiscal 2008). China Green Agriculture's business is conducted through its indirect wholly owned People's Republic of China-based operating subsidiaries, Techteam (for the fertilizer business) and Jintai (for the agricultural products business). Jintai is wholly owned by Techteam.

== Jintai ==
Jintai produces various categories of products: Flowers include principally Cymbidium and Phalaenopsis. Those two kinds of flowers are mainly distributed to the middle and high-end consumers in Shaanxi Province and its adjacent areas. Their seedlings are distributed across the country, especially the southern regions of China. Green vegetables and fruits include principally, Holland cucumbers, sweet and colored pimientos and eggplant and Japanese watermelons, which are distributed to middle and high-end consumers in Shaanxi Province, especially in Xi'an city. Multicolored seedlings include principally, photinia serrulata, which are distributed to customers across China.

== Fertilizers ==
China Green Agriculture's humic acid organic liquid compound fertilizers contain humic acid as one of their major ingredients and its products are certified as Green Food Production Material by the China Green Food Development Center. It developed 13 types of fertilizers during fiscal 2008, which includes Guokangmei Green Nutriment Fertilizer, Jinong Zhuangshi, Libangnong Humic Acid Potassium Fertilizer, Zhimeizi Organic Liquid Compound Fertilizer, Yichongwang No.1, Suxiao Chongshifei, Boron Fertilizer, Calcium-rich Fertilizer, Potassium-calcium Anti-cracking fertilizer, Yuzhuang, Wangting, Yelvbao and Libangnong. It distributes its fertilizer products through 480 distributors in 27 provinces in the People's Republic of China.

== Competition ==
China Green Agriculture competes with China Agritech, Inc., Qiqihar Fuer Agriculture Co., Ltd., Heze Exploitation Region Caozhou Chamurgy Co., Ltd., Guangxi Beihai Penshibao Co., Ltd., Western Lanhua Company, Ningdong Branch of State Forestry Administration, Sanbao Horticultural Company, Tianjin Goods Company, Shanghai Crystal Company, Beijing Sanyi Company, Jinri Company, Yunnan QianHui Company, Zhejiang Senhe Company and Jiangsu Xiaoshan Zhongtian Technology Company.
