= Castlight Health =

US healthcare navigation company

Castlight Health, Inc.
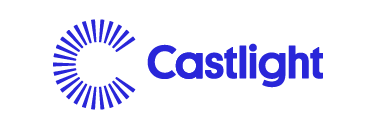
- Company type: Public
- Traded as: NYSE: CSLT (Class B); Russell 2000 Component
- Founded: 2008
- Fate: Acquired by Vera Whole Health
- Headquarters: United States
- Key people: Jon Porter, CEO
- Revenue: ▼US$143 million (2019) ▲US$156 million (2018)
- Net income: ▼US$ (58) million loss(2016)
- Owner: apree health
- Website: www.castlighthealth.com

Castlight Health is a Sandy, UT-based healthcare navigation company. It offers comparison tools showing price and quality metrics for tests and procedures offered by healthcare providers.

The Castlight platform is licensed through a business-to-business model. Employees of companies with subscriptions get access to the Castlight platform. Health plan partners, such as Anthem Blue Cross Blue Shield, provides commercial members with access to Castlight's tools as well. In 2012 the company secured $100 million in investment funds. In 2014 the company had its initial public offering, valued at $2 billion. The company claimed to have grown to work with "over 260 customers covering 10 million lives" on the platform.

== History ==
=== Acquisition by Vera Whole Health, Inc ===
On the January 5, 2022 it was announced that Castlight would be acquired by Vera Whole Health for US$370 million. Vera launched a tender offer of $2.05 for all outstanding Class A and B shares. The same day, Halper Sadeh LLP, an investor rights law firm, announced an investigation into whether $2.05 per share was a fair price for investors. The outcome of this is not publicly known.

=== apree health ===
After integrating their operations, Vera Whole Health and Castlight rebranded as apree health in September 2022. Donald Trigg, former CEO of Cerner Corporation, was appointed as CEO of apree. Vera and Castlight continued operating as distinct brands under this umbrella.

In late 2024, under private equity firm Clayton, Dubilier & Rice, and health insurance company Elevance Health, apree health merged with Millennium Physician Group to form Mosaic Health, with each sub-brand remaining independent and Castlight Health still operating as a product.
