= Cobalt International Energy =

Cobalt International Energy, Inc.
- Company type: Public company
- Traded as: NYSE: CIEIQ
- Founded: 2005; 21 years ago
- Headquarters: Houston, Texas
- Key people: William P. Utt, Chairman; Timothy J. Cutt, CEO; David D. Powell, CFO
- Production output: 1.28 thousand barrels of oil equivalent (7,800 GJ) per day (2016)
- Revenue: ▲$0.016 billion (2016)
- Net income: ▼ -$2.343 billion (2016)
- Total assets: ▼$2.230 billion (2016)
- Total equity: ▼ -$0.841 billion (2016)
- Number of employees: 111 (2016)
- Website: www.cobaltintl.com

Cobalt International Energy, Inc. is a development stage petroleum exploration and production company headquartered in Houston, Texas. Cobalt International Energy Inc. filed for bankruptcy on December 14, 2017.

== Current operations ==
The company has reserves deepwater in the Gulf of Mexico and offshore Angola and Gabon in West Africa.

The company owns a 9.375% working interest in the Heidelberg field, approximately 140 miles south of Port Fourchon off the Louisiana coast, which is operated by Anadarko Petroleum.

== History ==
The company was founded in November 2005.

In December 2009, the company became a public company via an initial public offering, raising $850 million.

In 2012, the United States Department of Justice initiated an investigation into allegations that the company engaged in bribery in Angola, in violation of the Foreign Corrupt Practices Act. The investigation was closed in 2017.

In April 2013, James Painter, the president of the company, resigned.

In 2015, the company reached an agreement to sell its Angolan assets for $1.75 billion to Sonangol Group. However, the deal fell through after Isabel dos Santos took over the company.

In May 2016, Timothy J. Cutt, formerly of BHP, was named chief executive officer of the company.

Cobalt International Energy filed for bankruptcy on December 14, 2017 in the U.S. Bankruptcy Court in Houston. At the time, it had 82 workers, with 31 temporary workers and 19 independent contractors.

To the dismay of many, on April 10, 2018 Cobalt International Energy terminated shareholders interest in the company as part of the bankruptcy agreement.
