= Artivion =

Medical device company

Artivion, Inc.
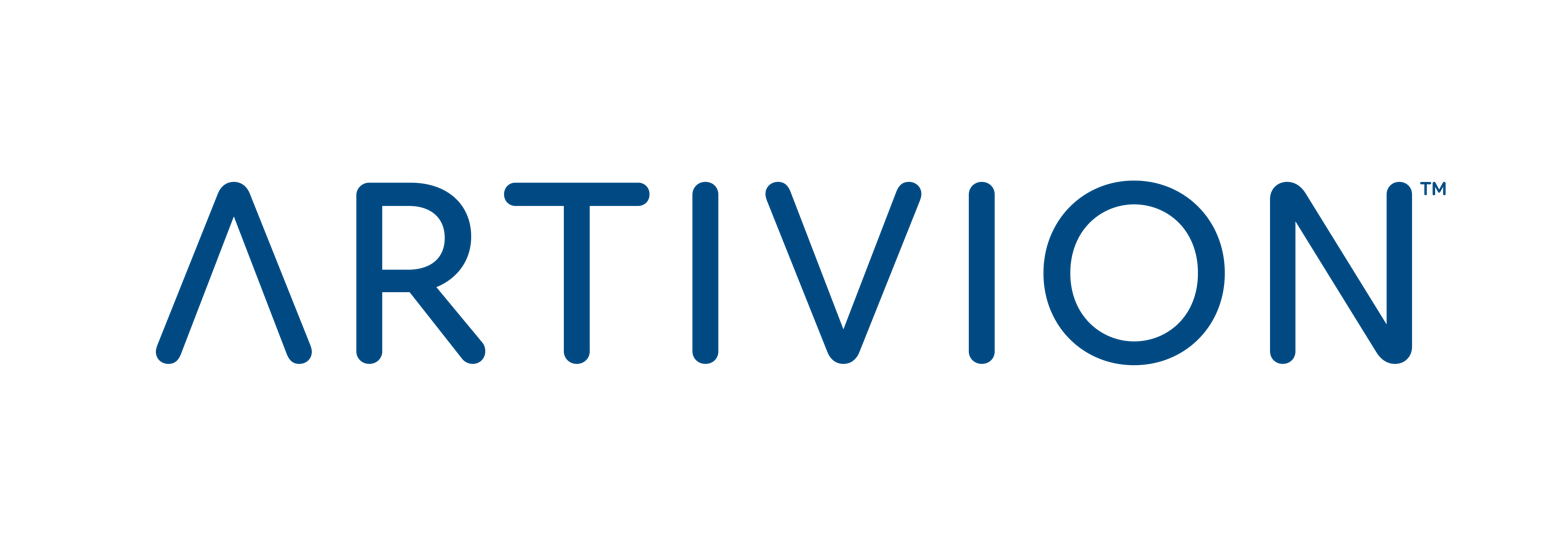
- Company type: Public
- Traded as: NYSE: AORT; S&P 600 component
- Industry: Medical devices
- Founded: 1984
- Founder: Steven Anderson; Robert McNally
- Headquarters: Kennesaw, Georgia, United States
- Key people: J. Patrick Mackin, Chairman of the Board, President & CEO
- Products: Human tissues for transplant, surgical sealants, mechanical heart valves, stents and grafts
- Revenue: $298,836,000 (2022)
- Number of employees: 1300 (2022)
- Website: artivion.com

Artivion, Inc. is a distributor of cryogenically preserved human tissues for cardiac and vascular transplant applications and develops medical devices. Among its products are human heart valves, which are treated to remove excess cellular material and antigens, and BioGlue surgical adhesive.

== History ==
Artivion was founded as CryoLife in Sarasota, Florida in 1984 by Steven Anderson and Robert McNally. Anderson acted as the company’s president and CEO from its founding. The company later moved from Sarasota to the Atlanta metropolitan area. In January 2022 the company changed its name to Artivion, Inc.

In 2000, CryoLife began offering a surgical adhesive called BioGlue used for sealing surgical lacerations under high pressure, such as in arteries.

In February 2008, the FDA gave CryoLife approval for a new kind of heart valve, made from human tissues, which was the first to remove cells from the transplant tissue as opposed to only cleaning the tissue. In giving the approval, the FDA said the new valve, called the CryoValve SynerGraft Pulmonary Valve, had less of a chance of rejection than previous valves.

In 2010, CryoLife acquired the rights to manufacture and distribute PerClot, an absorbable hemostatic powder used in surgery.

In January 2016, the company acquired On-X Life Technologies and its principal product, a mechanical heart valve called the On-X aortic valve replacement, for $130 million.

In October 2017, Artivion acquired JOTEC GmbH, a German-based developer of medical devices for aortic and peripheral vascular diseases, for €225 million. In September 2020, the company acquired Ascyrus Medical.

In 2021, the company received FDA premarket application approval of its PerClot absorbable hemostatic system, which comprised PerClot granules and a delivery system for surgical use. Baxter International agreed to buy PerClot from Artivion in 2021. In 2023, after final FDA approval of the product, the purchase was completed.

== See also ==
- Allotransplantation
- Artificial heart valve
