= Land use in China =

Land Usage in China

Land use in China is experiencing massive changes and impacts to the environment due to an unprecedented period of economic growth, which has catapulted it from one of the world's poorest countries 30 years ago to the world's second largest economy today. Based on trends in economic development, population growth, and land use, China's natural landscape will experience significant and increasing pressures well into the future.

== Urbanization ==
China has four times the population of the U.S., within roughly the same area. With 1.4 billion inhabitants, 20% of the world's population lives in China. While the rate of population growth has been declining for decades, the total number of inhabitants has been growing and is expected to do so through 2030. China's urban population is growing rapidly; between 1950 and 2009, the percentage of the population living in urban areas quadrupled from 14% to 48%. Meanwhile, the rural population is declining, opening the landscape in areas that are not urbanized. The forests and farming land of eastern China support far more people and major cities than do the grasslands, deserts, and high mountain regions of the west.

== Cultivated land ==
The vast majority of China's cultivated land lies in eastern China. Nearly all of the arable land, totaling 122 million hectares or 13% of the country, is cultivated. To ensure adequate food production, the government has identified a minimum threshold or “redline” of 120 million hectares of cultivated land. Chinese law also requires a one-to-one replacement (in quantity and quality of farmland that is converted to other uses). These policies, combined with development and other land use pressures, are shifting the location of farmland. Some cultivated lands are being newly created from other uses such as forestry, grasslands, and wetlands while existing cultivated lands are being converted to other uses such as built-up areas, forests, and grasslands.

== Livestock grazing ==
Livestock grazing occurs throughout China and is possibly the most common use of grasslands. China is the world's largest producer of sheep and goats, and the fourth largest producer of cattle. Livestock grazing is a major driver of grassland degradation in China. The government has instituted a variety of programs to combat desertification, which has slowed to 3,000 km2 per year.

== Forest uses ==
Since the late 1950s, China's forests have experienced several periods of significant deforestation, which contributed to related environmental disasters such as the Yangtze River flood in 1998. In response, the Central Government has attempted to restore forest cover by investing upwards of 1 trillion RMB into six forest conservation programs, the most significant of which include Grain to Green (1999–2016) and the Natural Forest Protection Program (NFPP) (1998–2020). These programs combine afforestation efforts (primarily in northern China) and timber harvesting bans or limits to restore forest cover. Forest cover was 20% as of 2008; the Central Government aims to achieve 23% forest cover by 2020, and 26% by 2050.

== Mining and Energy Development ==
China has one of the largest mining sectors in the world and is the world's largest energy producer. Energy production is on the rise, which will impact biodiversity as China constructs more mines, oil and gas wells, dams and hydropower stations, wind farms, pipelines, and other infrastructure. In particular, western and central China will experience increasing energy development because they hold many untapped and lesser tapped oil and gas fields, coal reserves, and areas with the highest potential for wind and solar energy production

== Transportation ==
China is expanding its road and rail networks, investing 5 trillion RMB to construct 40,000 km of railroads by 2020. The vast majority of planned and existing transit is located in eastern China. Secondary road construction is more of an emphasis in western China. The rail network is expanding nationwide to connect most cities with populations of at least 200,000.

== See also ==
- Economy of China
- Demographics of China
