= Franklin Hiram King =

American agricultural scientist (1848–1911)

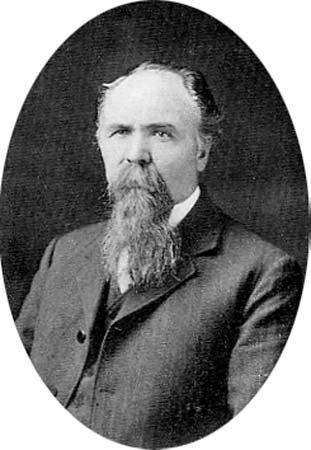
- Franklin Hiram King, from the frontispiece of Farmers of Forty Centuries (1911).
- Born: June 8, 1848; La Grange, near Whitewater, Wisconsin, United States
- Died: August 4, 1911 (aged 63); United States
- Education: Whitewater State Normal School
- Known for: Soil science; Cylindrical storage silo
- Spouse: Carrie Baker (m. 1880)
- Children: Anna; Max; Clarence; Hugh; Ralph; Howard
- Awards: Doctor of Science, University of Wisconsin (1910)
- Scientific career
- Fields: agricultural scientist
- Workplaces: River Falls State Normal School (1878–1888), University of Wisconsin–Madison (1888–1901); US Department of Agriculture, Bureau of Soils (1901–1904)

Franklin Hiram King (8 June 1848 – 4 August 1911) was an American agricultural scientist who was born on a farm near Whitewater, Wisconsin, attended country schools, and received his professional training first at Whitewater State Normal School, graduating in 1872, and then at Cornell University. King is now best remembered for his first-hand account of traditional agricultural practices in Asia, now regarded as an organic farming classic text.

King served as a professor of agricultural physics at the University of Wisconsin–Madison from 1888 until 1902. Interested in a wide range of subjects throughout his career, King made major contributions during these years in research and teaching that dealt with applications of physics to agriculture. Most attention was given to soil physics, for example, water-holding capacities of soils, moisture requirements of plants, aeration, movement of water in soils, movement of groundwater, the drafts of plows, and the lifting power of windmills; he also began studies of soil fertility. The impact of his career was greatest in the field of soil science. He has been called the father of soil physics in the United States.

King left Wisconsin to become chief of the Division of Soil Management in the USDA Bureau of Soils in Washington, D.C. in January 1902. His findings in the next two years, that the concentration of nutrients in soil solution was correlated with crop yields, began to undermine beliefs held strongly by the chief of the bureau, Milton Whitney, about the relations of soil chemistry to plant growth and soil fertility. King was forced to resign but privately published several additional papers from his research during this period.

King returned to Madison, where he devoted the last seven years of his life to summarizing earlier findings and conducting further research in agricultural physics, including the ventilation of farm buildings. Three of his seven books were written during that period, the best known of which is Farmers of Forty Centuries, or Permanent Agriculture in China, Korea, and Japan, which recounted his investigations into what would now be called organic farming or sustainable agriculture during a nine-month tour of Asia in 1909. The last chapter was completed after his death, in 1911, by Carrie Baker King, his wife, who then published the book that same year. It has been described by Lord Northbourne—the founder of organic agriculture—as a "classic" which "no student of farming or social science can afford to ignore".

He is most popularly known for designing the cylindrical storage silo, which reduces the occurrence of spoilage in the silage. Some have speculated that Frank Lloyd Wright's design of the Guggenheim Museum was influenced by King's designs. King is commemorated at the University of Wisconsin–Madison by King Hall, so renamed in 1934, which is the same Agricultural Physics Hall in which he worked during his tenure there and which now houses part of the Department of Soil Science (formed by the 1904 reorganization of King's original department into the 'Soils Department' and the 'Agricultural Engineering Department'), and by the F. H. King Students for Sustainable Agriculture, a student organization that grows various crops that are given away to community residents to raise awareness of sustainable farming and gardening.

== Bibliography ==
=== In the Bulletin (University of Wisconsin. Agricultural Experiment Station) ===
- King, Franklin Hiram (1889). Comparative value of warm and cold water for milch cows in winter. Bulletin (University of Wisconsin. Agricultural Experiment Station). Vol. 21. Madison, Wis.: University of Wisconsin.
- King, Franklin Hiram (1891). The construction of silos. Bulletin (University of Wisconsin. Agricultural Experiment Station). Vol. 28. Madison, Wis.: University of Wisconsin.
- King, Franklin Hiram (1894). Destructive effects of winds on sandy soils and light sandy loams: with methods of protection. Bulletin (University of Wisconsin. Agricultural Experiment Station). Vol. 42. Madison, Wis.: University of Wisconsin.
- King, Franklin Hiram (1895). The agricultural possibilities of Douglas county and northwest Wisconsin. Bulletin (University of Wisconsin. Agricultural Experiment Station). Vol. 43. Madison, Wis.: University of Wisconsin. pp. 7–26.
- King, Franklin Hiram (1898). One years work done by 16-foot geared wind mill. Bulletin (University of Wisconsin. Agricultural Experiment Station). Vol. 68. Madison, Wis.: University of Wisconsin. pp. 3–44.
- King, Franklin Hiram (1899). Construction of cheese curing rooms for maintaining temperatures of 58° to 68°F (PDF). Bulletin (University of Wisconsin. Agricultural Experiment Station). Vol. 70. Madison, Wis.: University of Wisconsin.
- King, Franklin Hiram (1899). Principles of construction and maintenance of country roads. Bulletin (University of Wisconsin. Agricultural Experiment Station). Vol. 79. Madison, Wis.: University of Wisconsin. OCLC 7746053.
- King, Franklin Hiram (1900). The character and treatment of swamp or humus soil. Bulletin (University of Wisconsin. Agricultural Experiment Station). Vol. 80. Madison, Wis.: University of Wisconsin.
- King, Franklin Hiram (1900). Experiments in grinding with small steel feed mills. Bulletin (University of Wisconsin. Agricultural Experiment Station). Vol. 82. Madison, Wis.: University of Wisconsin.
- King, Franklin Hiram (1900). Silage, and the construction of modern silos. Bulletin (University of Wisconsin. Agricultural Experiment Station). Vol. 83. Madison, Wis.: University of Wisconsin. pp. 6–68.
- King, Franklin Hiram; Whitson, A. R. (1901). Development and distribution of nitrates and other soluble salts in cultivated soils. Bulletin (University of Wisconsin. Agricultural Experiment Station). Vol. 85. Madison, Wis.: University of Wisconsin. OCLC 17645437.
- King, Franklin Hiram; Whitson, A. R. (1902). Development and distribution of nitrates in cultivated soils: second paper. Bulletin (University of Wisconsin. Agricultural Experiment Station). Vol. 93. Madison, Wis.: University of Wisconsin. OCLC 17645814.

=== In government publications ===
- King, Franklin Hiram (1892). Observations and experiments on the fluctuations in the level and rate of movement of ground-water on the Wisconsin agricultural experiment station farm and at Whitewater, Wisconsin. Bulletin (United States. Weather Bureau). Vol. 5. Washington, D.C.: Weather Bureau.
- King, Franklin Hiram (1896). Irrigation in humid climates. Farmers' bulletin. Vol. 46. Washington, D. C.: United States Department of Agriculture.
- King, Franklin Hiram (1897). Principles and conditions of the movements of ground water. Annual Report, United States Geological Survey. Vol. 19, part 2. Washington, D. C.: United States Department of Agriculture. pp. 59–294. 11 plates.
- King, Franklin Hiram (1901). Irrigation experiments in Wisconsin. Bulletin. Vol. 119. United States Department of Agriculture, Office of Experiment Stations. pp. 313–352.
- King, Franklin Hiram (1904). Differences between four southern and four northern soils, and improvements in soil management which these differences suggest. Bulletin. Vol. 142. United States Department of Agriculture, Office of Experiment Stations. pp. 104–111.
- King, Franklin Hiram (1905). Investigations in soil management. Part I. Amount of plant food readily recoverable from soils with distilled water. Part II. Relation of crop yields to the amounts of water-soluble plant-food materials recovered from soils. Part III. Relation of differences of climatological environment to crop yields. Bureau of Soils Bulletin. Vol. 26. Washington, D. C.: United States Department of Agriculture. Milton Whitney, Chief of Bureau. 205 pages, 4 plates.

=== Encyclopedia Articles ===
- King, Franklin Hiram (1907). "The Treatment of the Soil With Reference to Moisture". Tillage: Its Philosophy and Practice. Cyclopedia of American Agriculture. Vol. 11. pp. 378–387.
- King, Franklin Hiram (1907). "The Treatment of the Soil With Reference to Moisture". The Necessity and Practice of Drainage. Cyclopedia of American Agriculture. Vol. 1. pp. 412–419.
- King, Franklin Hiram (1908). "Drainage". The Standard Cyclopedia of Modern Agriculture (British). Vol. 4. pp. 182–215.
- King, Franklin Hiram (1908). "Irrigation". The Standard Cyclopedia of Modern Agriculture (British). Vol. 7. pp. 170–181.

=== Books ===
- King, Franklin Hiram (1889). Weeds in the United States. OCLC 133080989. Abstract: "This is a collection of weed bulletins from many states at turn of century. F. H. King must have gathered & bound them."
- King, Franklin Hiram (1891). Elementary lessons in the physics of agriculture. Published by the author. 133 pages, 65 figures.
- King, Franklin Hiram (1895). The Soil, its nature, relations, and fundamental principles of management. Macmillan & Co. p. 1.
- King, Franklin Hiram (1899). Irrigation and drainage—principles and practice of their cultural phases (PDF). Macmillan & Co.
- King, Franklin Hiram (1901). A Text Book of the Physics of Agriculture (PDF). Madison, Wis.: Mrs. F. H. King. p. 604. 176 illustrations.
- King, Franklin Hiram (1904). Investigations in Soil Management: Being Three of Six Papers on the Influence of Soil Management Upon the Influence of Soil Management Upon the Water-soluble Salts in Soilsand the Yield of Crops. The Author.
- King, Franklin Hiram (1908). Ventilation for Dwellings, Rural Schools, and Stables (PDF). Madison, Wis.: F. H. King. p. 128. 63 illustrations.
- King, Franklin Hiram (1911). Farmers of Forty Centuries, or Permanent Agriculture in China, Korea and Japan (PDF). Madison, Wis.: Mrs. F. H. King. p. 441. 246 illustrations, introduction by Dr. L. H. Bailey.
- King, Franklin Hiram (1914). Carrie H. Baker King (ed.). Soil Management (PDF). Kegan Paul, Trench, Trübner. p. 311.

=== Other publications ===
- King, Franklin Hiram (1904). Investigations in Soil Management: Being Three of Six Papers on the Influence of Soil Management Upon the Influence of Soil Management Upon the Water-soluble Salts in Soils and the Yield of Crops. Madison, Wis.: Published by the author. Bulletins E, F, and D. 168 pages. Includes a reprint from Science, N. S. Vol. XX, No. 514, pages 605–608, November 4, 1904, by E. W. Hilgard, a review of the above work.
- King, Franklin Hiram (1908). "On the suspension of solids in fluids and the nature of colloids and solutions". Transactions, Wisconsin Academy of Sciences, Arts and Letters. 16 (Part 1, No. 3). Madison, Wisconsin: 275–288.
- King, Franklin Hiram (October 1912). "The wonderful canals of China". National Geographic. 23 (10). Washington, D. C.: 931–958. Largely an excerpt from Farmers of Forty Centuries.

=== Unpublished ===
- King, Franklin Hiram (1901). Observations on crop and soil management methods and practices in China, Manchuria, Korea and Japan: made between Feb. 19 and July 21, 1901. Illustrations are mounted photos. Includes indexes. Typed from notes taken in the field for the author's book, Farmers of forty centuries. Typescript note from author's wife mounted in both vols. Univ. California, Davis copy has spine title: Observations on China, Korea and Japan; title at head of note in v. 2: Observations in China, Korea and Japan. 2 volumes (591 leaves) : illustrations
