= Fushan lettuce =

Variety of lettuce

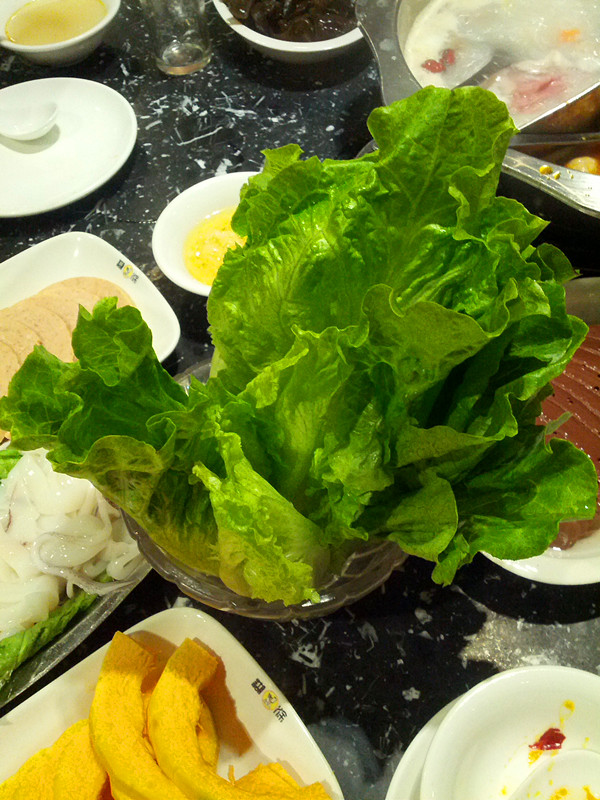
- Species: Lactuca sativa var. sativa
- Cultivar: 'Leaf Lettuce'

Fushan lettuce is a vegetable belonging to the genus Lactuca in the Asteraceae family. It is a type of tender-leaf lettuce within the lettuce category. In mainland China, like other leaf lettuces, it is generally referred to as “shengcai” (lettuce). In Beijing, it is commonly known as “chuncai” (spring vegetable), while in Taiwan, it is commonly called “mainland lettuce” or “mainland girl”.

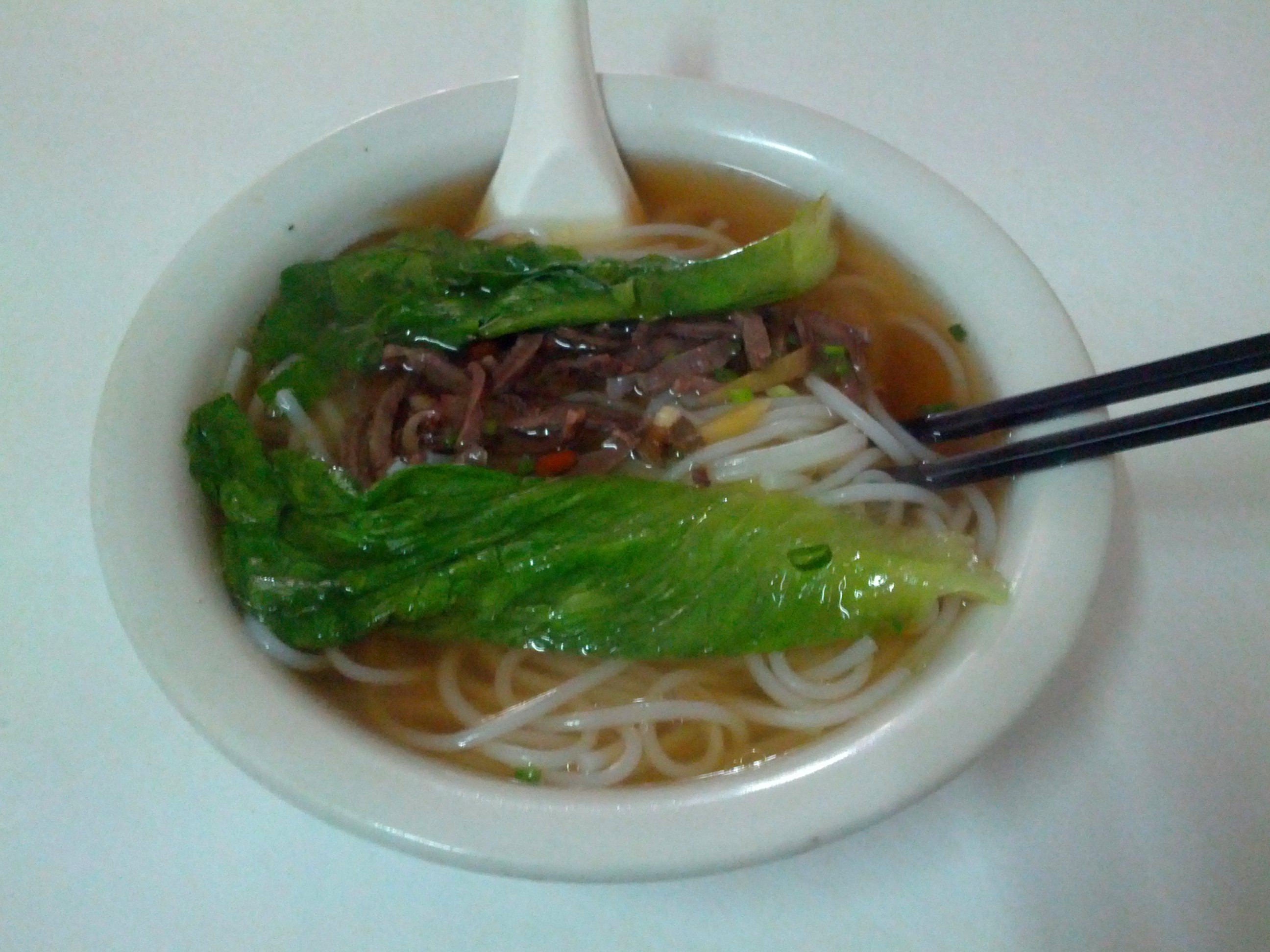
福山萵苣 Fushan lettuce

== Introduction ==
This vegetable is similar to the Taiwanese lettuce commonly known by Taiwanese people as “wozicai” (Taiwanese Hokkien: 妹仔菜, A仔菜, A菜). Early Taiwanese farmers called it “mainland wozicai” (tāi-lio̍k-e-á-tshài), or simply shortened it to “mainland lettuce” (tāi-lio̍k-e / tai-lio̍k-meh). Later, it was widely and mistakenly referred to as “mainland girl” (tāi-lio̍k-bē).

According to staff members of the Taipei Agricultural Products Marketing Corporation, before 1999, farmers in southern Taiwan privately introduced this vegetable from mainland China and began cultivating it in Taiwan. The Fushan lettuce sold in Taiwan is not imported from mainland China, but is locally grown in Taiwan and produced throughout the year.

Since 2001, it has become a very common household vegetable in southern Taiwan. The main cultivation areas are Erlun and Xiluo in Yunlin County, which are major leafy vegetable production regions in Taiwan. The daily market trading volume is about 2 to 3 metric tons.

In addition to being mistakenly called “mainland girl,” the company once named this emerging vegetable “youmaicai” (oil wheat vegetable). However, in Hong Kong and Macau, “youmaicai” actually refers to Taiwanese lettuce, which is commonly called “wozicai” in Taiwan.

Traditional lettuce was often used only as a decorative base for seafood dishes because of its poor texture and was usually not eaten. However, Fushan lettuce is an improved variety of lettuce with large green leaves and a sweet, crisp texture, making it widely popular.

In addition, because it does not easily change color and is inexpensive, it has become one of the common vegetables found in hot pot restaurants and snack shops in Taiwan.

== The name correction movement in Taiwan ==
In March 2017, students including Zeng Pinxuan from the Graduate Institute of Arts and Humanities Education at National Taipei University of the Arts launched the “Fushan Lettuce Name Correction Movement”. They called on the public and shop owners in Taiwan to replace the commonly used nickname “mainland girl” with the proper name “Fushan lettuce,” in order to remove the association between the vegetable's name and women from mainland China.

Taiwanese sociologist Li Mingcong also responded in support of the movement, stating that such a name could be considered a form of harassment toward women from mainland China living in Taiwan. Even if it did not amount to discrimination, it was still a frivolous and disrespectful term toward these women.

In November 2018, the Council of Agriculture of the Executive Yuan, the highest authority for agricultural affairs in Taiwan, officially responded to this issue for the first time on behalf of the Taiwanese government. It called on the public to use the correct name “Fushan lettuce,” stating that the term “mainland girl” carries discriminatory implications for women from mainland China, especially spouses from the mainland. It recommended using “Fushan lettuce” or “mainland A-cai” (lettuce, wozicai) instead, and advised against using the term “mainland girl”.
