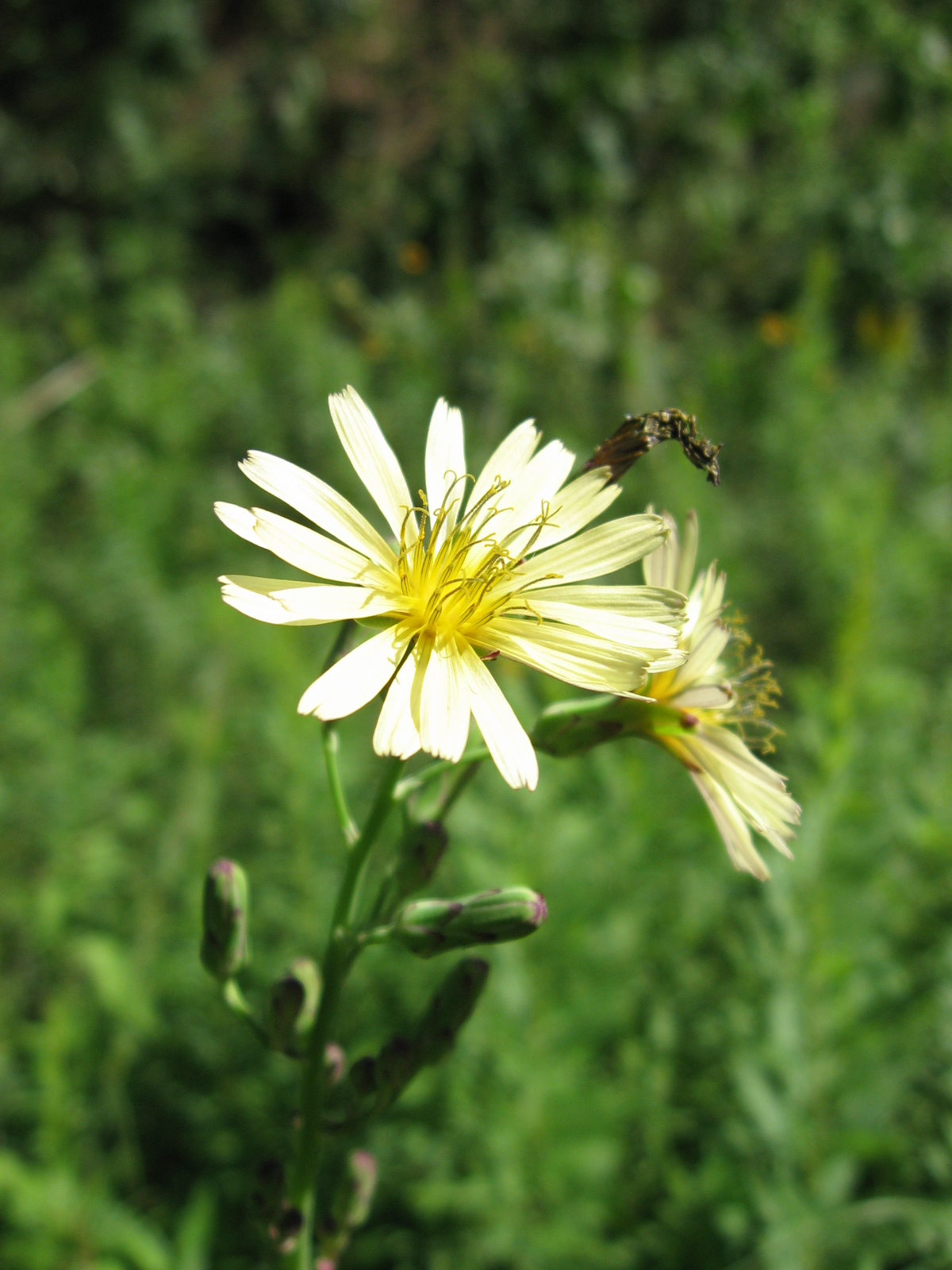
- A typical flower

Scientific classification
- Kingdom: Plantae
- Clade: Tracheophytes
- Clade: Angiosperms
- Clade: Eudicots
- Clade: Asterids
- Order: Asterales
- Family: Asteraceae
- Genus: Lactuca
- Species: L. indica

Binomial name
- Lactuca indica L. Mant. Pl. 2: 278. 1771.

Synonyms
- Brachyramphus sinicus Miq.; Chondrilla squarrosa (Thunb.) Poir.; Lactuca amurensis Regel & Maxim.; Lactuca amurensis Regel; Lactuca bialata Griff.; Lactuca brevirostris Champ.; Lactuca brevirostris Champ. ex Benth.; Lactuca cavaleriei H.Lév.; Lactuca dracoglossa Makino; Lactuca hoatiensis H.Lév. & Vaniot; Lactuca kouyangensis H.Lév.; Lactuca laciniata (Houtt.) Makino; Lactuca mauritiana Poir.; Lactuca squarrosa (Thunb.) Miq.; Lactuca squarrosa (Thunb.) Maxim.; Leontodon acutissimus Noronha; Prenanthes laciniata Houtt.; Prenanthes squarrosa Thunb.; Pterocypsela indica (L.) C.Shih; Pterocypsela indivisa (Makino) H.S.Pak; Pterocypsela laciniata (Houtt.) C.Shih

= Lactuca indica =

Species of lettuce

Lactuca indica, Indian lettuce, is a species of plant in the tribe Cichorieae within the family Asteraceae. It is native to western China (Xinjiang, Tibet), the Himalayas, and southwest Asia, as far west as Turkey. It is widely introduced elsewhere, even as far as east Africa, and is thought to be an archaeophyte in Japan, brought in with rice cultivation.

Lactuca indica is a biennial herb, growing from a taproot to at least 40 cm tall and often reaching 2 m. Its flowers have white to pale yellow ray florets with yellower centers. The narrowness of the leaf blades and the degree of spikiness of leaf lobes varies greatly by region.

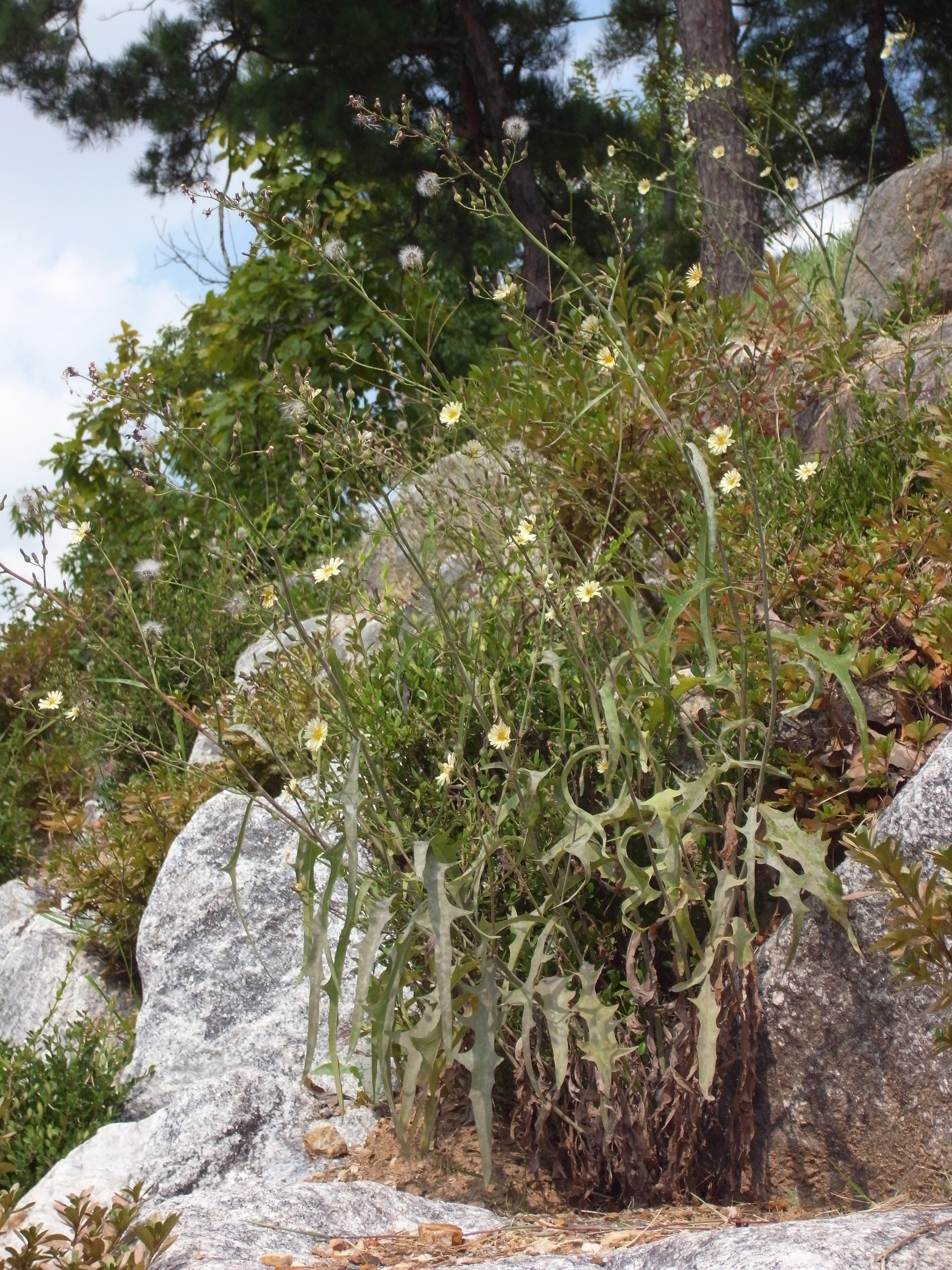
Lower leaves senescing during flowering, a trait typical to this species

It is cultivated (or rather, its growth is encouraged) as fodder for rabbits, pigs, poultry and even fish in Asia. Its young leaves can be, and are, consumed as a leaf vegetable in salads like other dandelions. It is also used in traditional medicines as an aid to digestion.

== See also ==
- Lactuca sativa
- A-choy
