= Broccoli mandate =

Argument against U.S. healthcare reform

The broccoli mandate, also known as the broccoli test, broccoli argument, broccoli hypothetical or broccoli horrible, was an argument used by those opposed to healthcare reform in the United States proposed by Barack Obama, who was then the President of the United States.

== Use in 2012 Supreme Court summation ==
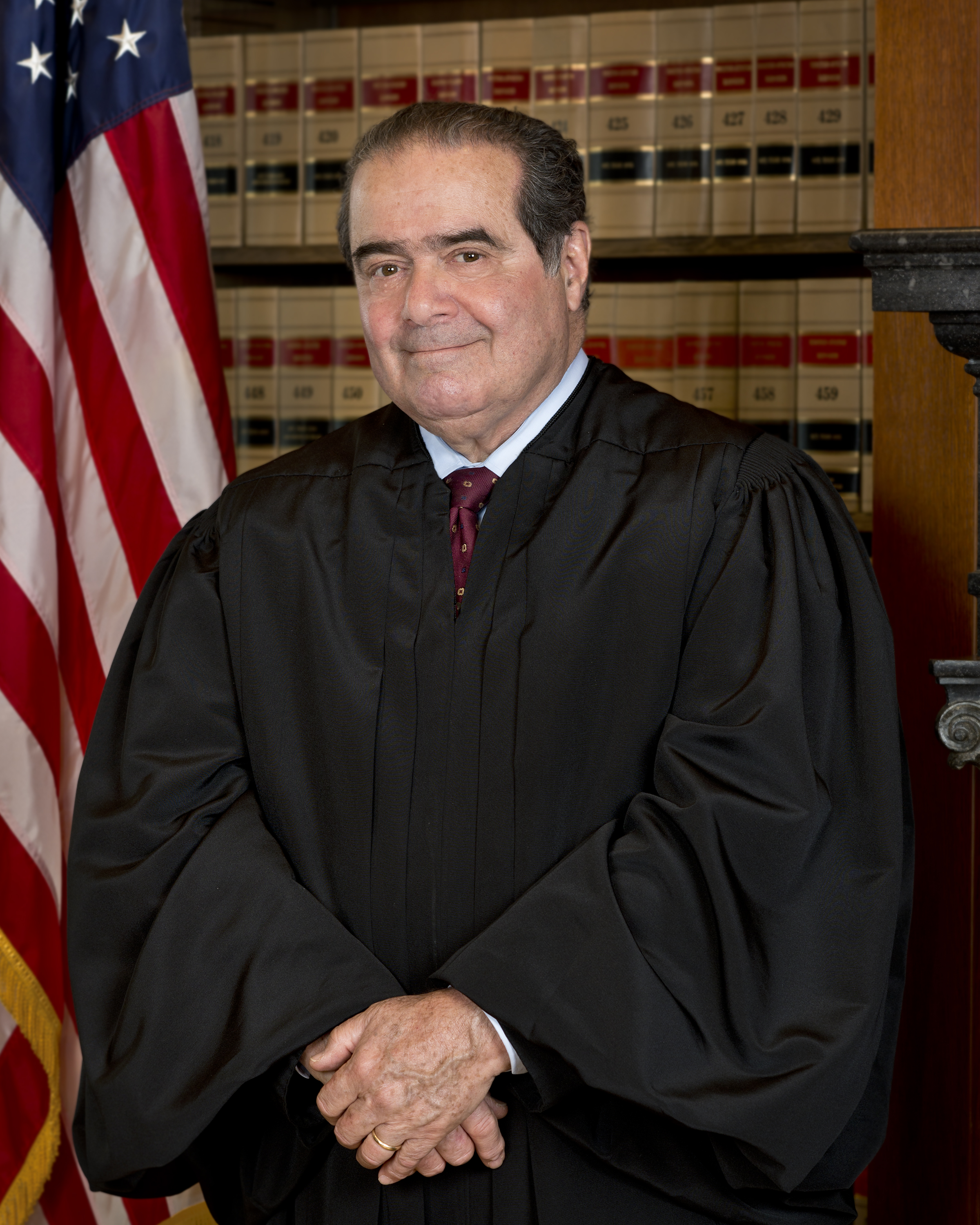
Supreme Court Justice Antonin Scalia used the broccoli argument in a 2012 summation.

The broccoli mandate was referenced by the conservative Supreme Court Justice Antonin Scalia in 2012, in his summation against healthcare reform. On March 27 of that year, Justice Scalia asked Donald B. Verrilli Jr., a lawyer for the Obama administration, to defend the individual shared responsibility provision (commonly called the individual mandate) of the Affordable Care Act (ACA), saying to Verrilli:

It may well be that everybody needs health care sooner or later, but not everybody needs a heart transplant, not everybody needs a liver transplant ... Could you define the market? Everybody has to buy food sooner or later, so you define the market as food, therefore, everybody is in the market; therefore, you can make people buy broccoli.

Opponents of reform — such as Justice Scalia — say that it should not be compulsory for American people to purchase health insurance under the Affordable Care Act just because it is beneficial, otherwise, an enforcement body could similarly mandate Americans to buy broccoli because of its benefits to human health, which they say is an example of over-reaching authority. It has been described as a form of the slippery slope and reductio ad absurdum arguments.

Supporters of the individual mandate have questioned this analogy. For example, Verrilli told Justice Scalia that the health care market is unique and:

... quite different [to the food market]. The food market, while it shares that trait that everybody's in it, it is not a market in which your participation is often unpredictable and often involuntary. It is not a market in which you often don't know before you go in what you need, and it is not a market in which, if you go in and – and seek to obtain a product or service, you will get it even if you can't pay for it.

== Legacy ==
Use of the so-called 'broccoli mandate' in the summations of conservative justices in the National Federation of Independent Business v. Sebelius (NFIB) case was said to have:

... sealed broccoli's immortality in constitutional jurisprudence. The three main written opinions included twelve references to broccoli and five separate discussions of the broccoli mandate's legal implications. Five justices cited the government's inability to provide a satisfying answer to the broccoli hypothetical as a justification for creating a novel limitation on Congress's Commerce Clause powers and for concluding that the ACA's mandate exceeded that limit. Even the dissenters to the Commerce Clause holding felt compelled to respond to what Justice Ginsburg referred to as "the broccoli horrible."

— Mark D. Rosen and Christopher W. Schmidt, UCLA Law Review

== See also ==
- George H. W. Bush broccoli comments
