= George H. W. Bush broccoli comments =

Dislike of the vegetable by the U.S. President

George H. W. Bush in 1989

During his tenure as the 41st president of the United States, George H. W. Bush frequently mentioned his distaste for broccoli, famously saying: "I do not like broccoli. And I haven't liked it since I was a little kid. And my mother made me eat it. Now I'm president of the United States. And I'm not gonna eat any more broccoli!" Bush's views on broccoli were seen as out of touch with Americans, as broccoli was becoming more popular and was referred to as the "vegetable of the 80s".

Hillary Clinton and Tipper Gore, wives of Democratic nominees for president and vice president Bill Clinton and Al Gore, were seen holding a sign that stated: "Let's put broccoli in the White House again." After Bush left office, he occasionally mentioned his dislike of broccoli. Bush's son, 43rd president George W. Bush, mentioned his father's dislike of broccoli in a eulogy at his father's funeral.

== Comments and analysis ==
George H. W. Bush served as the 41st president of the United States from 1989 to 1993. During his presidency, he frequently mentioned his distaste for broccoli. The first mention was made in March 1990, when Bush joked that the workers in the Office of Personnel Management would get their merit pay "in broccoli". Soon after, U.S. News & World Report reported a story stating that Bush had banned broccoli from Air Force One. On March 22, when asked if he had "lost the broccoli vote", Bush said:

I do not like broccoli. And I haven't liked it since I was a little kid and my mother made me eat it. And I'm President of the United States, and I'm not going to eat any more broccoli! ... For the broccoli vote out there, Barbara [Bush's wife] loves broccoli. She's tried to make me eat it. She eats it all the time herself. So, she can go out and meet the caravan of broccoli that's coming in [from Washington].

In response, the broccoli-growers of California, who produced over 90 percent of America's broccoli, pledged to send several trucks of the vegetable to the White House. George Dunlop, the president of the United Fresh Fruit and Vegetable Association, gave First Lady Barbara Bush a bouquet of broccoli and an additional 10 tons of the vegetable in trucks. A few days later, Bush hosted a state dinner to honor Tadeusz Mazowiecki, the prime minister of Poland. Journalists noted that there was no broccoli on the menu as the tons of broccoli given to the first family had been donated to the Capital Area Food Bank. Bush contrasted Poland's protest against totalitarianism with his "rebellion against broccoli". Following Bush's comments, broccoli saw an increase in popularity, with its sale rising by 10 percent. A supermarket sales director told the Los Angeles Times that "Broccoli has never enjoyed so much publicity".

Broccoli was becoming popular in the United States and had been referred by Gary Lucier of the Department of Agriculture as the "vegetable of the 80s". Consumption of broccoli had doubled in that decade, increasing from an annual average of 3 pounds (1.4 kilograms) per person in 1980 to 6.8 pounds (3.1 kilograms) per person in 1988. Because of Bush's comments, broccoli was frequently referred to as a "political vegetable".

When asked about the effect of Bush's comments on children, Barbara Bush replied that: "He ate broccoli until he was 60. Tell them to eat it until they are 60." Bush's anti-broccoli comments were later criticized, and opened up a nationwide debate on Bush's eating habits, in particular his fondness for unhealthy foods such as beef jerky. Michael F. Jacobson, executive director of the Center for Science in the Public Interest, referred to Bush's statements as "a stupid joke that undermines a serious effort to promote better nutrition ...". Campbell's and Woman's Day magazine organized a recipe contest titled: "How to Get President Bush to Eat Broccoli"; the winner received $7,500 (equivalent to $17,728 in 2025).

Eric Ostermeier, a researcher at the Humphrey School of Public Affairs, recorded 70 instances where Bush had mentioned his hatred of the vegetable during his presidency. In May 1991, Bush was diagnosed with Graves' disease. It led many Americans to write letters to Bush, insisting that he eat more broccoli due to its health benefits. Bush's comments on broccoli, along with an incident in which he vomited on the prime minister of Japan, Kiichi Miyazawa, were seen as examples of his tendency for political gaffes.

== Aftermath ==
George Bush
(@GeorgeHWBush)
tweeted:

Proud of young Cooper's interest in healthy eating. His declared love of broccoli is genuine, if also unpersuasive.
Image of the letter from Cooper

June 25, 2016

Hillary Clinton and Tipper Gore, wives of Democratic nominees for president and vice president Bill Clinton and Al Gore, were seen holding a sign which stated: "Let's put broccoli in the White House again". In 2001, Bush's son and the 43rd president George W. Bush received substantial media attention after he gave a thumbs-down to broccoli on a state visit to Mexico; Mexico's president Vicente Fox was a keen broccoli-grower.

At an anti-obesity event for children in 2013, Barack Obama, the 44th president, announced that his favorite food was broccoli. These remarks were contrasted with those of Bush.

After leaving office, Bush occasionally mentioned his dislike of broccoli. George W. Bush mentioned his father's dislike of broccoli in a eulogy at his 2018 funeral.

== See also ==
- Broccoli mandate
