= Broccoli =

Edible green plant in the cabbage family

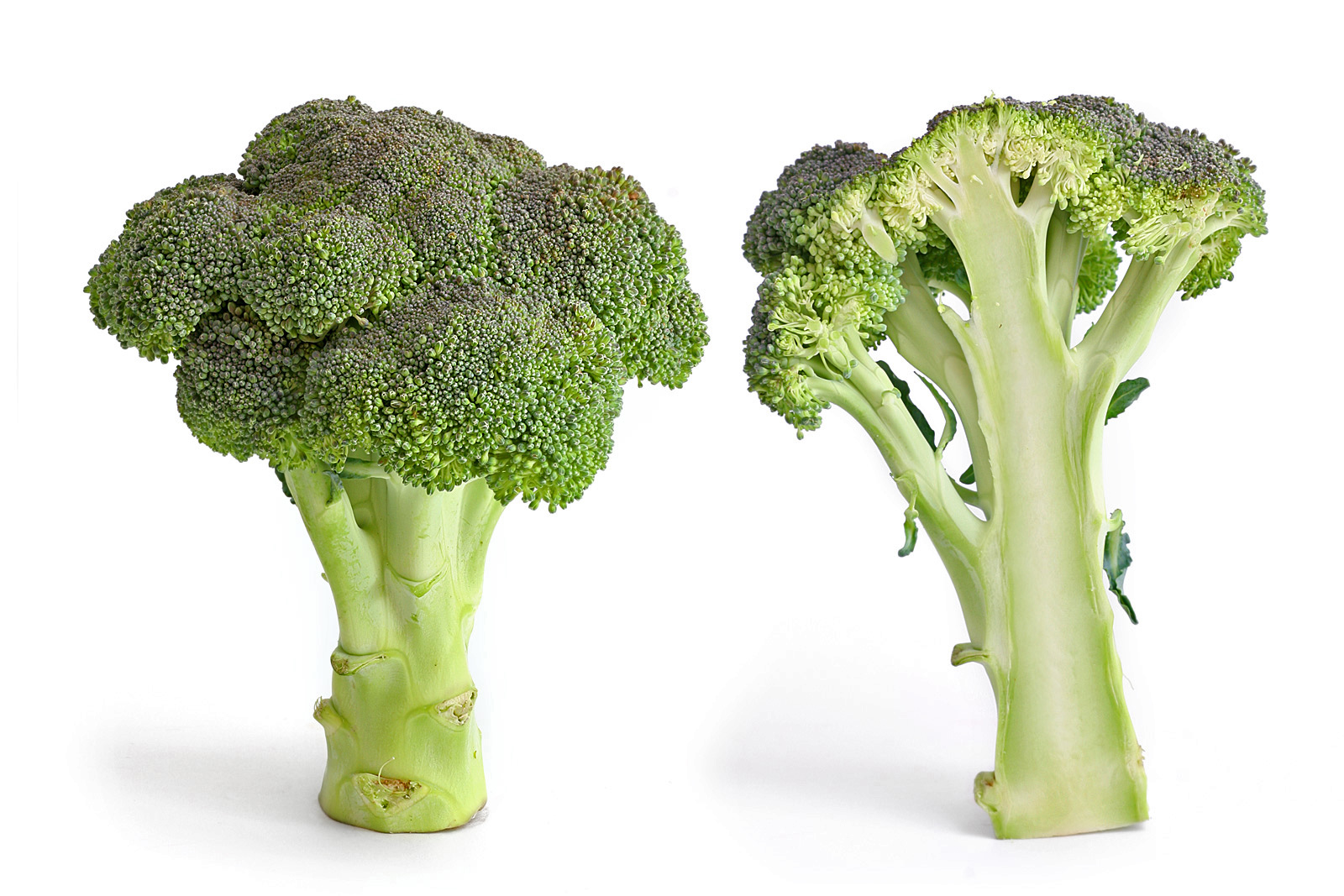
- Genus: Brassica
- Species: Brassica oleracea
- Cultivar group: Italica
- Origin: Italy, more than 2,000 years ago

Broccoli (Brassica oleracea var. italica) is an edible green plant in the cabbage family (family Brassicaceae, genus Brassica) whose large flowering head, stalk and small associated leaves are eaten as a vegetable. Broccoli is classified in the Italica cultivar group of the species Brassica oleracea. Broccoli has large flower heads, or florets, usually dark green, arranged in a tree-like structure branching out from a thick stalk, which is usually light green. Leaves surround the mass of flower heads. Broccoli resembles cauliflower, a different but closely related cultivar group of the same Brassica species.

It can be eaten either raw or cooked. Broccoli is a particularly rich source of vitamin C and vitamin K. Contents of its characteristic sulfur-containing glucosinolate compounds, isothiocyanates and sulforaphane, are diminished by boiling but are better preserved by steaming, microwaving or stir-frying.

Rapini, sometimes called "broccoli rabe", is a distinct species from broccoli, forming similar but smaller heads, and is actually a type of turnip (Brassica rapa).

== Taxonomy ==
Brassica oleracea var. italica was described in 1794 by Joseph Jakob von Plenck in Icones Plantarum Medicinalium 6:29, t. 534. Like all the other brassicas, broccoli was developed from the wild cabbage (Brassica oleracea var. oleracea), also called colewort or field cabbage.

== Etymology ==
The word broccoli, first used in the 17th century, comes from the Italian plural of broccolo, which means "the flowering crest of a cabbage", and is the diminutive form of brocco, meaning "small nail" or "sprout".

== History ==
Broccoli resulted from the breeding of landrace Brassica crops in the northern Mediterranean starting in about the sixth century BCE. Broccoli has its origins in primitive cultivars grown in the Roman Empire and was most likely improved via artificial selection in the southern Italian Peninsula or in Sicily. Broccoli was spread to northern Europe by the 18th century and brought to North America in the 19th century by Italian immigrants. After the Second World War, the breeding of the United States and Japanese F1 hybrids increased yields, quality, growth speed, and regional adaptation, which produced the cultivars commonly grown since then: 'Premium Crop', 'Packman', and 'Marathon'.

== Description ==
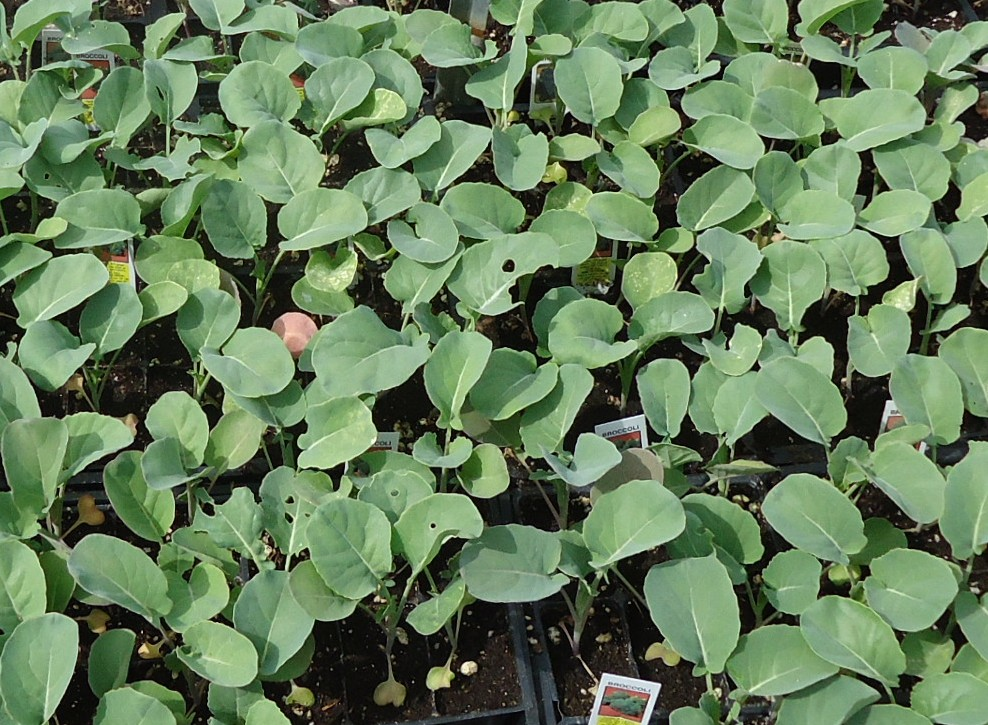
Broccoli plants in a nursery

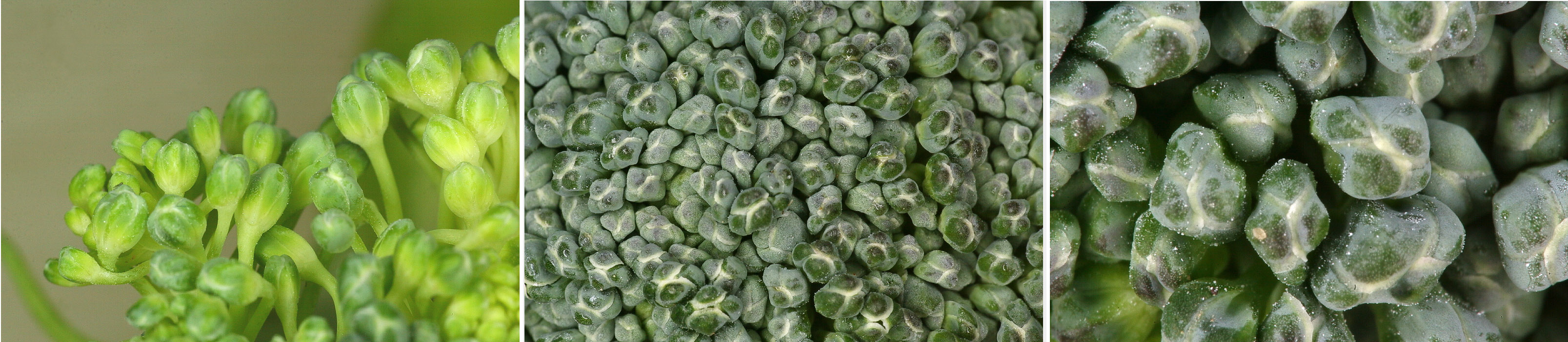
Close-up of broccoli florets (click to enlarge)

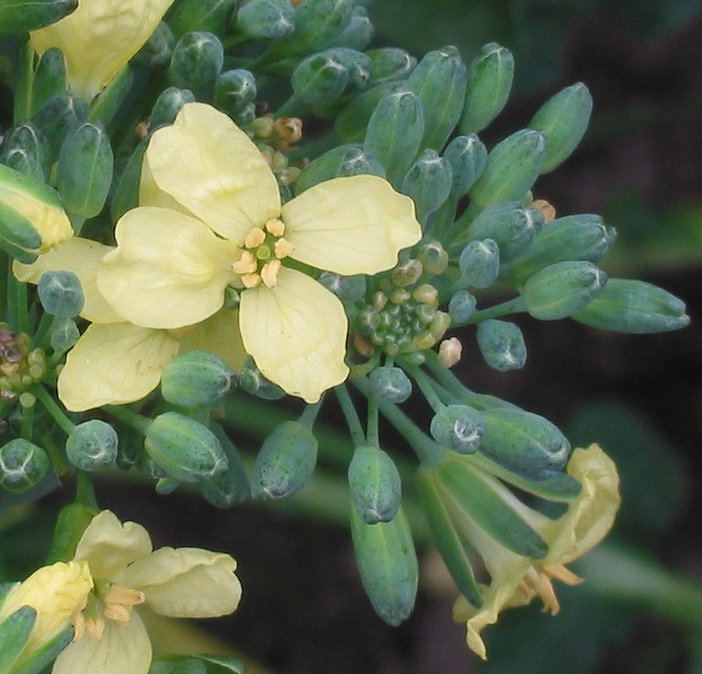
Broccoli flower

Broccoli is an annual cruciferous plant which can grow up to 60–90 cm (24–35 in) tall.

Broccoli inflorescence grows at the end of a central, edible stem and is dark green. Violet, yellow, or even white heads have been created, but these varieties are rare. The flowers are yellow with four petals.

The growth season for broccoli is 14–15 weeks. Broccoli is collected by hand immediately after the head is fully formed yet the flowers are still in their bud stage. The plant develops numerous small "heads" from the lateral shoots which can be harvested later.

== Varieties ==
There are three commonly grown types of broccoli. The most familiar is Calabrese broccoli, often referred to simply as "broccoli", named after Calabria in Italy. It has large 10-to-20-centimetre (4–8 in) green heads and thick stalks. It is a cool-season annual crop. Sprouting broccoli (white or purple) has a larger number of heads with many thin stalks. Purple cauliflower or violet cauliflower is a type of broccoli grown in Europe and North America. It has a head shaped like cauliflower but consists of many tiny flower buds. Sometimes, but not always, it has a purple cast to the tips of the flower buds. Purple cauliflower may also be white, red, green, or other colors.

Beneforté is a variety of broccoli containing 2–3 times more glucoraphanin and produced by crossing broccoli with a wild Brassica variety, Brassica oleracea var villosa.

=== Genomics ===
The first telomere-to-telomere genome assembly of Brassica oleracea var. italica was published in 2026. The genome is approximately 633.6 Mb in size and comprises nine chromosomes. The assembly has a BUSCO completeness of 99.4%, and 58,044 protein-coding genes were predicted.

== Other cultivar groups of Brassica oleracea ==
Other cultivar groups of Brassica oleracea include cabbage (Capitata Group), cauliflower and Romanesco broccoli (Botrytis Group), kale (Acephala Group), collard (Viridis Group), kohlrabi (Gongylodes Group), Brussels sprouts (Gemmifera Group), and kai-lan (Alboglabra Group). As these groups are the same species, they readily hybridize: for example, broccolini or "Tenderstem broccoli" is a cross between broccoli and kai-lan. Broccoli cultivars form the genetic basis of the "tropical cauliflowers" commonly grown in South and Southeastern Asia, although they produce a more cauliflower-like head in warmer conditions.

== Cultivation ==
The majority of broccoli cultivars are cool-weather crops that grow poorly in hot summer weather. Broccoli grows best in an average daily temperature range of 54–68 °F (12–20 °C). When the cluster of flowers (also referred to as a "head") appears in the plant center, the cluster is generally green. Garden pruners or shears are used to cut the head about 25 mm (1 in) from the tip.

The growth of the broccoli head is temperature dependent, with higher temperatures leading to poorer head formation, while growth slows below 41 °F (5 °C). The specific response of broccoli to long-term heat-stress conditions, such as may occur with climate change, remain undetermined.

Broccoli is harvested before the flowers on the head bloom in a yellow color. Broccoli cannot be harvested using machines, but rather is hand-harvested.

== Production ==
Broccoli* production 2024, millions of tonnes
China	9.8
India	9.8
United States	1.0
Mexico	0.7
Spain	0.7
World	26.9
*Combined with cauliflower; Source: FAOSTAT, United Nations

In 2024, world production of broccoli (combined with cauliflowers) was 27 million tonnes, with China and India together accounting for 73% of the total (table). Secondary producers, each having about one million tonnes or less annually, were the United States, Mexico, and Spain.

In the United States, broccoli is grown year-round in California, which produced 92% of the crop nationally for sales as fresh produce in 2024.

Cauliflower and broccoli yield

Production of cauliflowers and broccoli

== Nutrition ==
Broccoli, raw
Nutritional value per 100 g (3.5 oz)
- Energy: 141 kJ (34 kcal)
- Carbohydrates: 6.64 g
- Sugars: 1.7 g
- Dietary fiber: 2.6 g
- Fat: 0.37 g
- Protein: 2.82 g
Vitamins and minerals
Vitamins	Quantity %DV^{†}
Vitamin A equiv. beta-Carotene lutein zeaxanthin	3% 31 μg 3% 361 μg 1403 μg
Thiamine (B1)	6% 0.071 mg
Riboflavin (B2)	9% 0.117 mg
Niacin (B3)	4% 0.639 mg
Pantothenic acid (B5)	11% 0.573 mg
Vitamin B6	10% 0.175 mg
Folate (B9)	16% 63 μg
Choline	3% 19 mg
Vitamin C	99% 89.2 mg
Vitamin E	5% 0.78 mg
Vitamin K	85% 101.6 μg
Minerals	Quantity %DV^{†}
Calcium	4% 47 mg
Copper	5% 0.049 mg
Iron	4% 0.73 mg
Magnesium	5% 21 mg
Manganese	9% 0.21 mg
Phosphorus	5% 66 mg
Potassium	11% 316 mg
Sodium	1% 33 mg
Zinc	4% 0.41 mg
- Other constituents: Quantity
- Water: 89.3 g
- Link to USDA Database entry
- ^{†}Percentages estimated using US recommendations for adults, except for potassium, which is estimated based on expert recommendation from the National Academies.

Raw broccoli is 89% water, 7% carbohydrates, 3% protein, and contains negligible fat (table). A 100-gram (3 1/2-ounce) reference amount of raw broccoli provides 141 kilojoules (34 kilocalories) of food energy and is a rich source (20% or higher of the Daily Value, DV) of vitamin C (99% DV) and vitamin K (85% DV) (table). Raw broccoli also contains moderate amounts (10–19% DV) of several B vitamins and the dietary mineral potassium, whereas other micronutrients are low in content (less than 10% DV). Broccoli contains the dietary provitamin A carotenoid, beta-carotene.

=== Cooking ===
Boiling substantially reduces the levels of broccoli glucosinolates, while other cooking methods, such as steaming, microwaving, and stir-frying, have no significant effect on glucosinolate levels.

== Taste ==
The perceived bitterness of cruciferous vegetables, such as broccoli, results from glucosinolates and their hydrolysis products, particularly isothiocyanates and other sulfur-containing compounds. Preliminary research indicates that genetic inheritance through the gene TAS2R38 may be responsible in part for bitter taste perception in broccoli.

== Pests ==
The larvae of Pieris rapae, also known as the "small white" butterfly, are a common pest in broccoli and were mostly introduced accidentally to North America, Australia, and New Zealand.

Additional pests common to broccoli production include:

- Aphids
- Cabbage looper
- Cabbage webworm
- Cross-striped cabbageworm
- Diamondback moth
- Cabbage maggot
- Harlequin cabbage bug

== Gallery ==
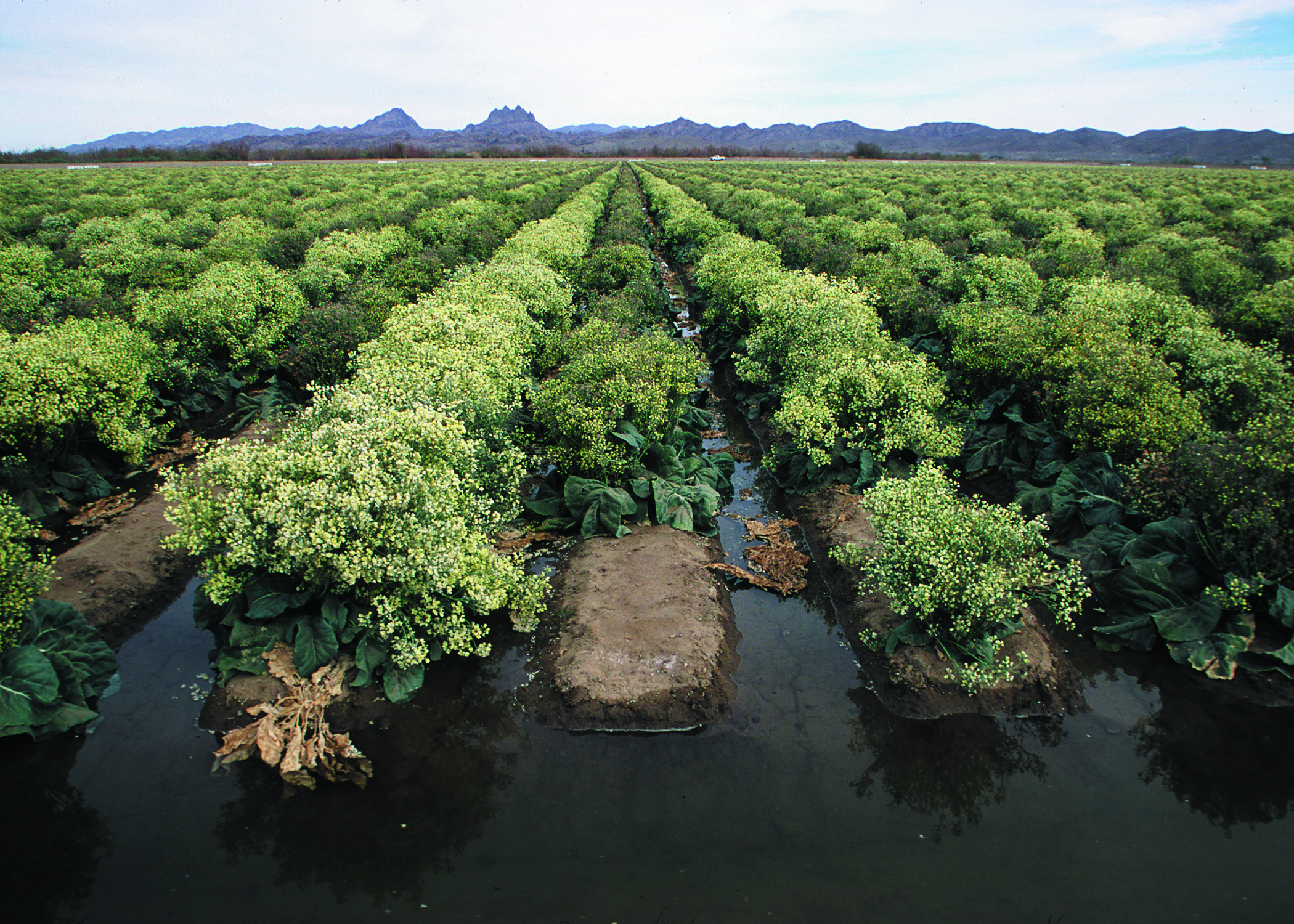
Furrow flood irrigation on a field of broccoli raised for seed in Yuma, Arizona.

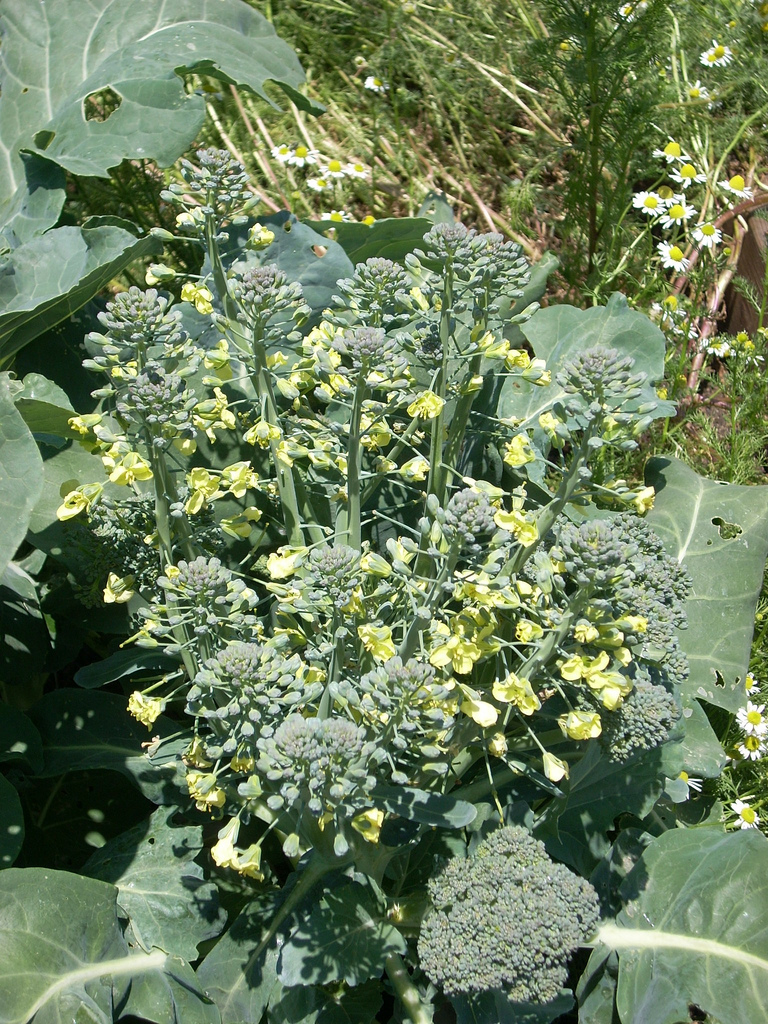
Broccoli in flower

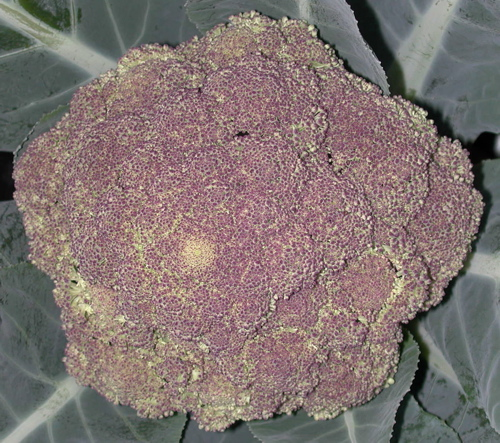
Sicilian purple broccoli

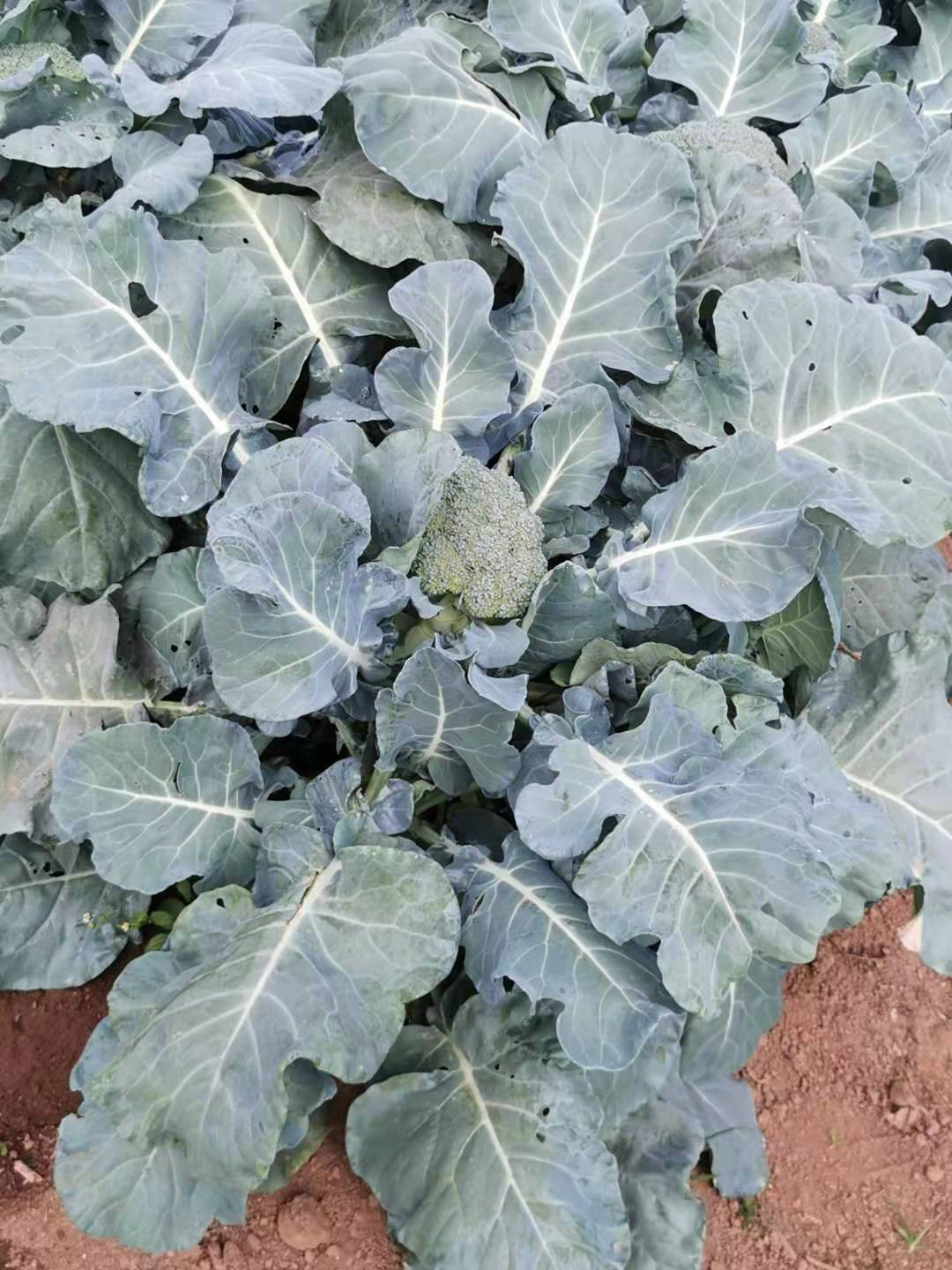
Broccoli "giant", whose flowering head and stalk can reach a kilo.

== See also ==
- Broccolini
- Epicuticular wax
- George H. W. Bush broccoli comments; the 41st U.S. president famously disliked the vegetable
- Microgreen
