= Gai lan =

Leaf vegetable

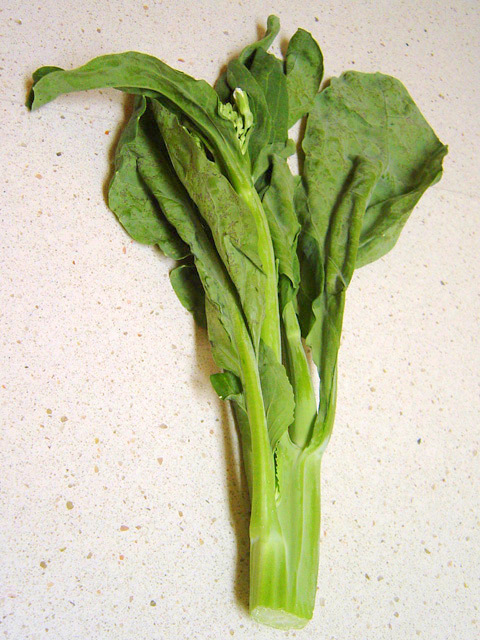
- Gai lan
- Species: Brassica oleracea
- Cultivar group: Alboglabra Group
- Origin: unknown

Gai lan
- "Gai lan" in Traditional (top) and Simplified (bottom) Chinese characters

Chinese name
- Traditional Chinese: 芥蘭
- Simplified Chinese: 芥兰
- Hanyu Pinyin: jièlán
- Jyutping: gaai^{3} laan^{4*2}
- Literal meaning: mustard orchid
Transcriptions
Standard Mandarin
- Hanyu Pinyin: jièlán
- IPA: [tɕjê.lǎn]
Yue: Cantonese
- Jyutping: gaai^{3} laan^{4*2}
- IPA: [kaj˧.lɐn˩]
Southern Min
- Hokkien POJ: keh-nâ

Burmese name
- Burmese: ကိုက်လန်

Vietnamese name
- Vietnamese: cải làn or cải rổ

Thai name
- Thai: คะน้า Thai pronunciation: [kʰā.náː]
- RTGS: khana

Khmer name
- Khmer: ខាត់ណា

Gai lan, kai-lan, Chinese broccoli, or Chinese kale (Brassica oleracea var. alboglabra) is a leafy vegetable with thick, flat, glossy blue-green leaves with thick stems, and florets similar to (but much smaller than) broccoli. A Brassica oleracea cultivar, gai lan is in the group alboglabra (from Latin albus "white" and glabrus "hairless"). When gone to flower, its white blossoms resemble that of its cousin Matthiola incana or hoary stock. The flavor is very similar to that of broccoli, but noticeably stronger and slightly more bitter.

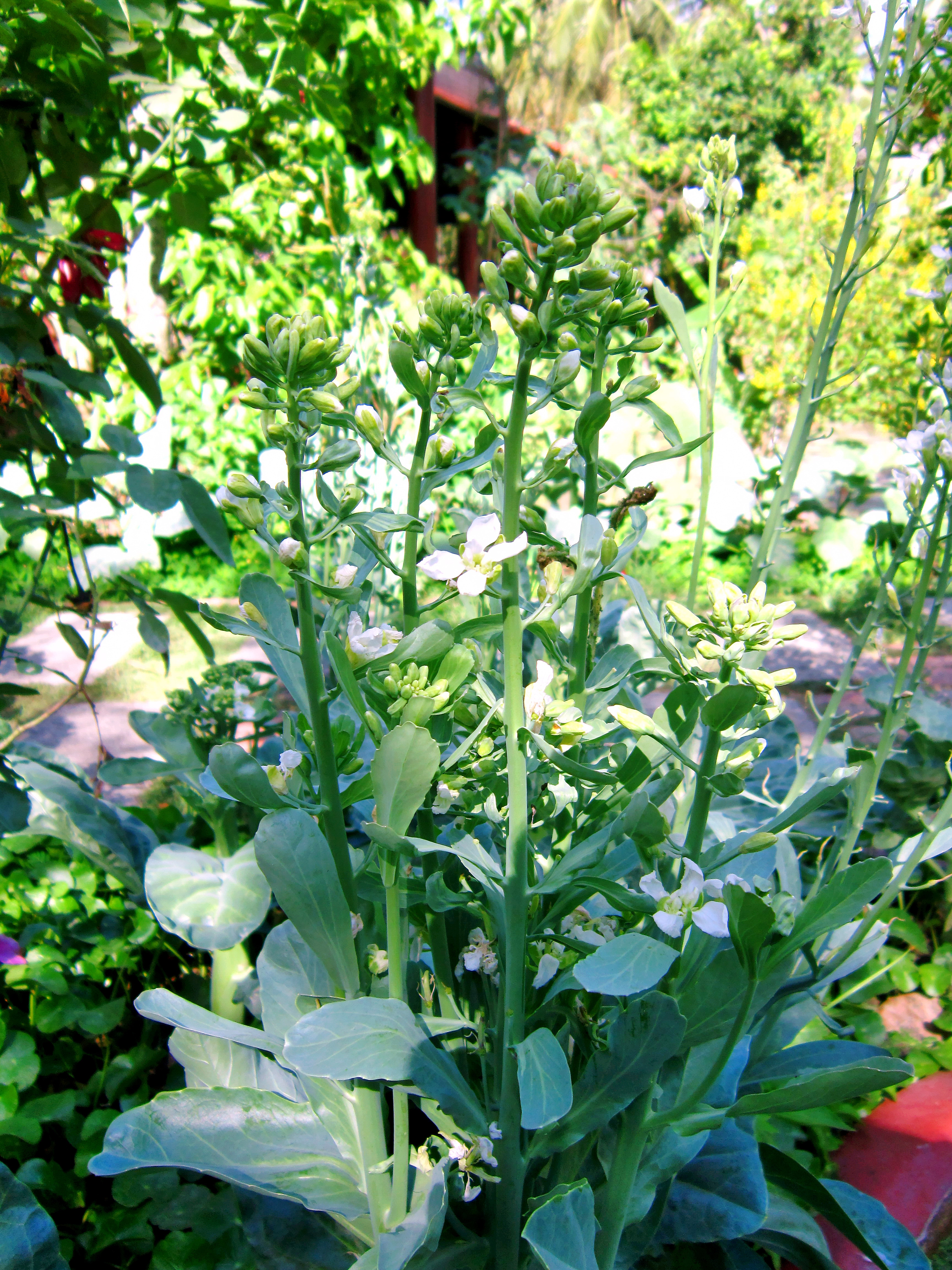
Gai lan plant growing in a vegetable garden

== Cultivation ==
Gai lan is a cool season crop that grows best between 18 and 28 °C (64 and 82 °F). It withstands hotter summer temperatures better than other brassicas such as broccoli or cabbage. Gai lan is harvested around 60–70 days after sowing, just before the flowers start to bloom. The stems can become woody and tough when the plant bolts. It is generally harvested for market when 15–20 cm (6–8 in) tall; however, it can also be produced as "baby gai lan." The "baby" version is cultivated through crowding of seedlings and generous fertilization; they resemble Brussels sprouts although they have looser folds.

== Hybrids ==
Broccolini is a hybrid between broccoli and gai lan.

== Uses ==
=== Culinary ===
The stems and leaves of gai lan are eaten widely in Chinese cuisine; common preparations include gai lan stir-fried with ginger and garlic, and boiled or steamed and served with oyster sauce. It is also common in Vietnamese, Burmese and Thai cuisine. In Chinese cuisine it is often associated with dim sum restaurants.

In Americanized Chinese food (like beef and broccoli), gai lan was frequently replaced by broccoli when gai lan was not available.

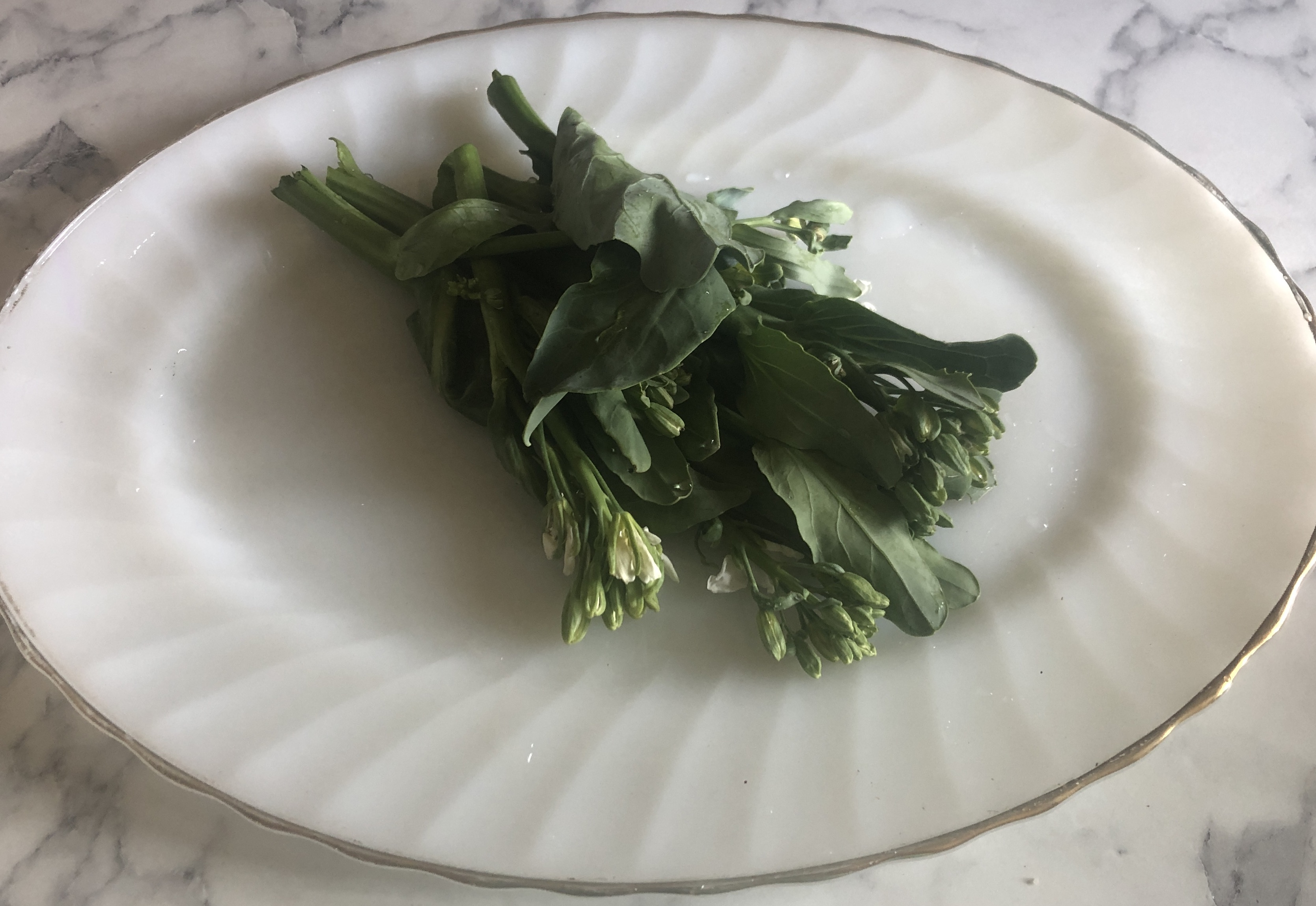
Gai lan trimmed and prepared for cooking.

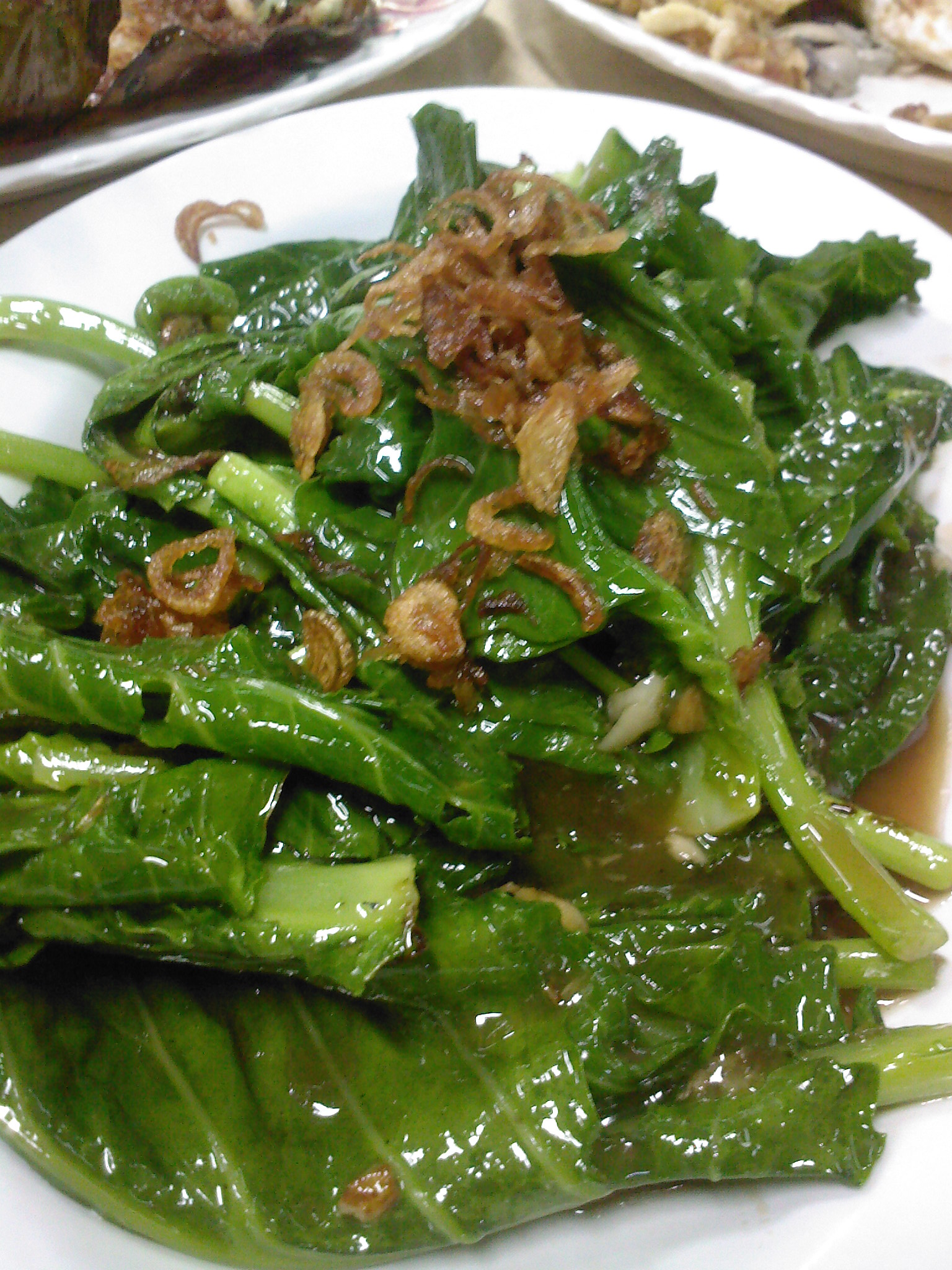
Baby gai lan served Cantonese-style.

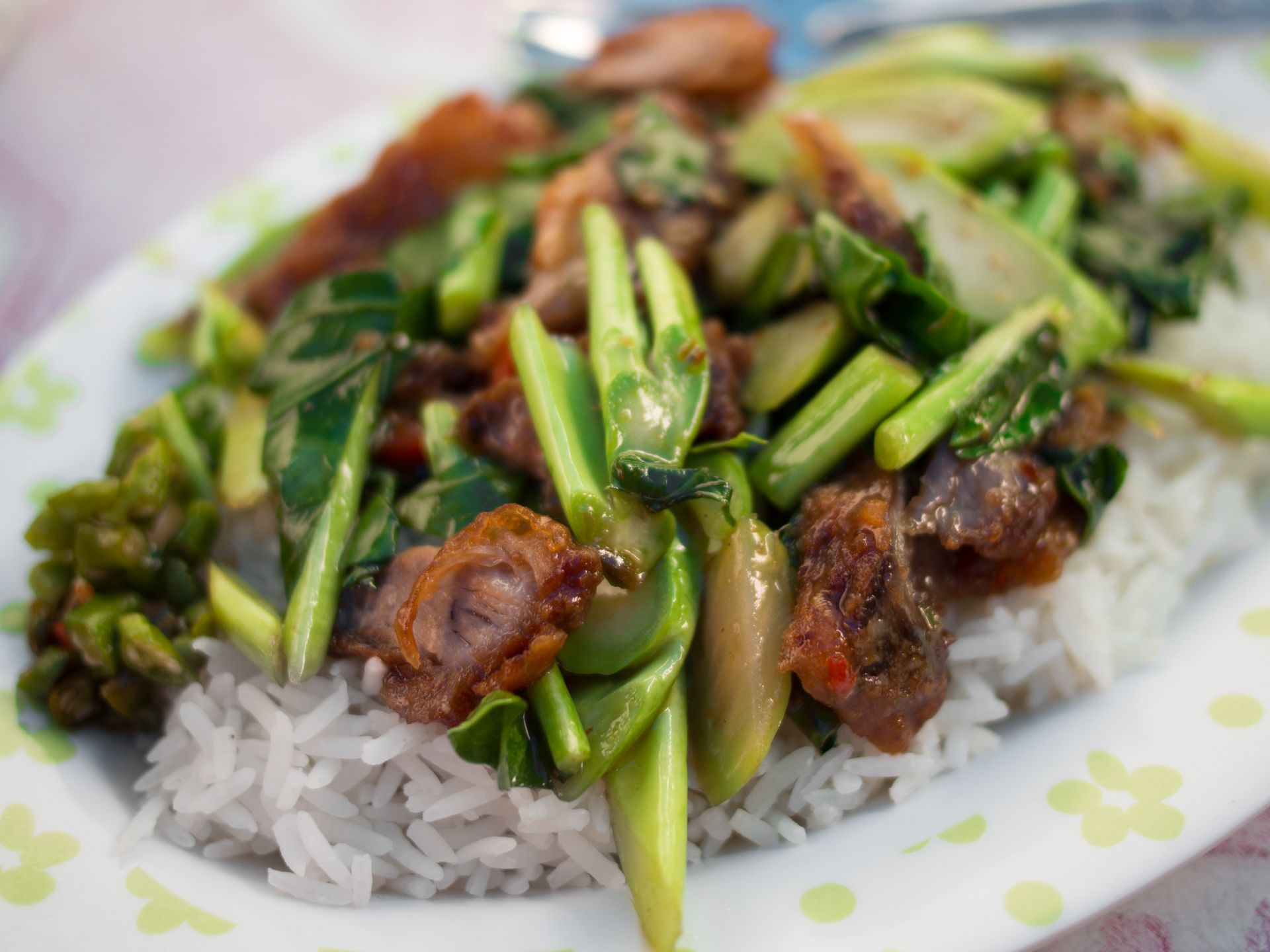
Phat khana mu krop: Thai-style fried Chinese broccoli with crispy pork belly.

== See also ==
- Bok choy
- Choy sum
- Kale
- Rapeseed
- Rapini
- A-Choy
