= Rapini =

Species of edible plant

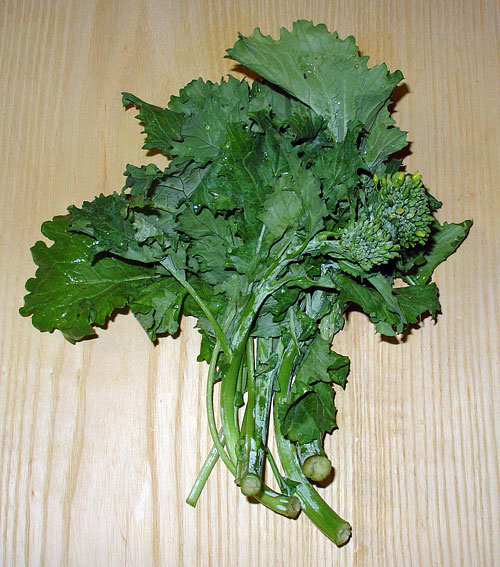
- Species: Brassica rapa
- Cultivar group: Ruvo group

Rapini (broccoli rabe or raab; /rɑːb/ RAHB) is a green cruciferous vegetable, with the leaves, buds, and stems all being edible; the buds somewhat resemble broccoli. Rapini is known for its bitter taste, and is particularly associated with Mediterranean cuisine. It is a particularly rich dietary source of vitamin K.

== Classification ==
Native to Europe, the plant is a member of the tribe Brassiceae of the Brassicaceae (mustard family). Rapini is classified scientifically as Brassica rapa var. ruvo, or Brassica rapa subsp. sylvestris var. esculenta. It is also known as broccoletti, broccoli raab, broccoli rabe, spring raab, and ruvo kale. Turnip and bok choy are different varieties (or subspecies) of this species.

== Description ==
Rapini has many spiked leaves that surround clusters of green buds that resemble small heads of broccoli. Small, edible yellow flowers may be blooming among the buds.

== Nutrition ==
Broccoli raab, raw
Nutritional value per 100 g (3.5 oz)
- Energy: 92 kJ (22 kcal)
- Carbohydrates: 2.85 g
- Sugars: 0.38 g
- Dietary fiber: 2.7 g
- Fat: 0.49 g
- Protein: 3.17 g
Vitamins and minerals
Vitamins	Quantity %DV^{†}
Vitamin A equiv. beta-Carotene lutein zeaxanthin	15% 131 μg 15% 1573 μg 1121 μg
Thiamine (B1)	14% 0.162 mg
Riboflavin (B2)	10% 0.129 mg
Niacin (B3)	8% 1.221 mg
Pantothenic acid (B5)	6% 0.322 mg
Vitamin B6	10% 0.171 mg
Folate (B9)	21% 83 μg
Vitamin C	22% 20.2 mg
Vitamin E	11% 1.62 mg
Vitamin K	187% 224 μg
Minerals	Quantity %DV^{†}
Calcium	8% 108 mg
Iron	12% 2.14 mg
Magnesium	5% 22 mg
Manganese	17% 0.395 mg
Phosphorus	6% 73 mg
Potassium	7% 196 mg
Sodium	1% 33 mg
Zinc	7% 0.77 mg
- Other constituents: Quantity
- Water: 92.55 g
- Link to USDA Database entry
- ^{†}Percentages estimated using US recommendations for adults, except for potassium, which is estimated based on expert recommendation from the National Academies.

Raw rapini (broccoli raab) is 93% water, 3% each of protein and carbohydrates, and contains negligible fat (table). In a reference amount of 100 g (3 1/2 oz), raw rapini supplies 92 kilojoules (22 kilocalories) of food energy, and is a rich source (20% or more of the Daily Value, DV) of vitamin K (187% DV), vitamin C (22% DV), and folate (21% DV) (table). Vitamin A, vitamin E, and several B vitamins, along with the dietary minerals, iron and manganese, are in moderate amounts (10–19% DV) (table).

== Culinary use ==
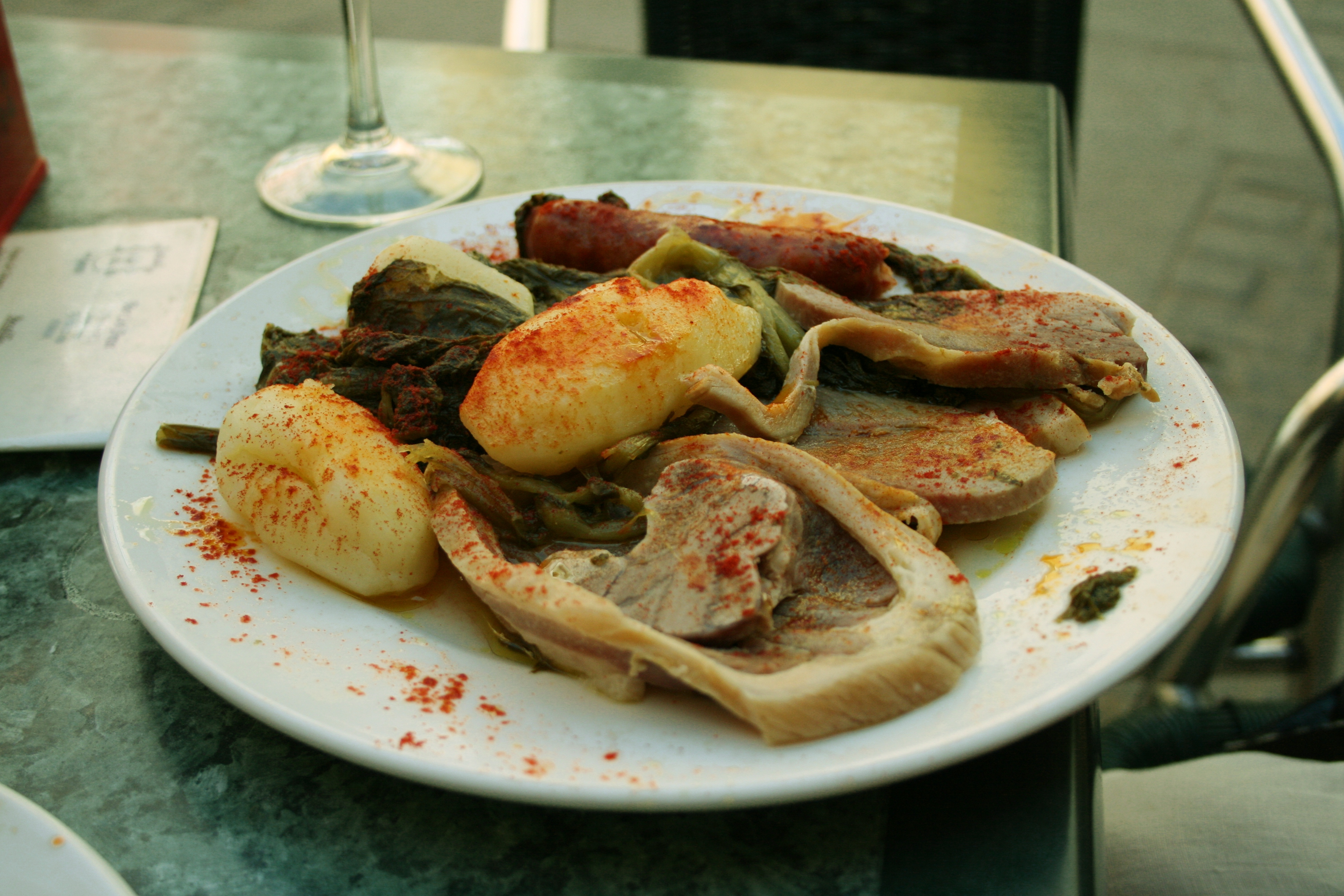
Lacón con grelos, a typical Galician dish: pork shoulder ham with rapini, along with steamed potatoes and a sausage

The flavor of rapini has been described as nutty, bitter, and pungent, as well as almond-flavored. Rapini needs little more than a trim at the base. The entire stalk is edible when young, but the base becomes more fibrous as the season advances.

Rapini is widely used in the cuisine of Rome as well as Southern Italy, particularly in the regions of Sicily, Calabria, Campania, Apulia, In Apulia, their names are either cime di rapa or broccoletti; in Naples, the green's name is friarielli. In Campania, it is closely associated with braciole and sausages, such that food writer Arthur Schwartz reports, "it is almost unthinkable to eat [those meats] without a side of [rapini]." In Portuguese cuisine, grelos de nabo are similar in taste and texture to broccoli rabe. Rapini is also popular in the Galicia region of northwestern Spain; a rapini festival (Feira do grelo) is held in the Galician town of As Pontes every February.

Rapini may be sautéed or braised with olive oil and garlic, and sometimes chili pepper and anchovy. It may be used as an ingredient in soup, served with orecchiette, other pasta, or pan-fried sausage. Rapini is sometimes (but not always) blanched before being cooked further.

In the United States, rapini is popular in Italian American cuisine; the D'Arrigo Brothers popularized the ingredient in the United States and gave it the name broccoli rabe. Broccoli rabe is a component of some hoagies and submarine sandwiches; in Philadelphia, a popular sandwich is Italian-style roast pork with locally made sharp provolone cheese, broccoli rabe, and peppers. Rapini can also be a component of pasta dishes, especially when accompanied by Italian sausage.

== See also ==
- Brassica juncea - Mustard greens
- Broccolini
- Chinese cabbage
- Collard (plant) - Collard greens
- Gai lan
- Rutabaga
