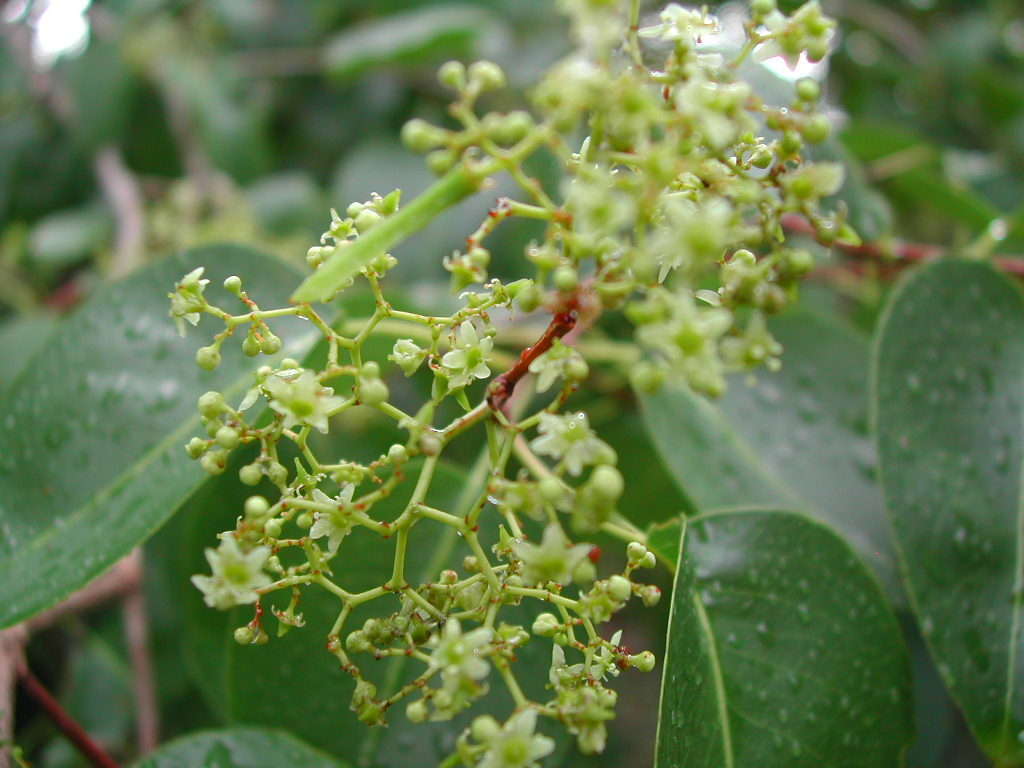
- Plenckia populnea in Brasil

Scientific classification
- Kingdom: Plantae
- Clade: Tracheophytes
- Clade: Angiosperms
- Clade: Eudicots
- Clade: Rosids
- Order: Celastrales
- Family: Celastraceae
- Genus: Plenckia; Reissek

Synonyms
- Austroplenckia Lundell; Viposia Lundell

= Plenckia =

Genus of flowering plant

Plenckia is a genus of flowering plants belonging to the family Celastraceae.

It is native to Bolivia, Brazil, Paraguay and north-western Argentina.

The genus name of Plenckia is in honour of Joseph Jakob Plenck (1735–1807), an Austrian physician and polymath. He is now known as a pioneer dermatologist. It was first described and published in C.F.P.von Martius & auct. suc. (eds.), Fl. Bras. Vol.11 (Issue 1) on page 30 in 1861.

== Known species ==
According to Kew:

- Plenckia integerrima Lundell
- Plenckia microcarpa Lundell
- Plenckia populnea Reissek
