= Broccolini =

Vegetable

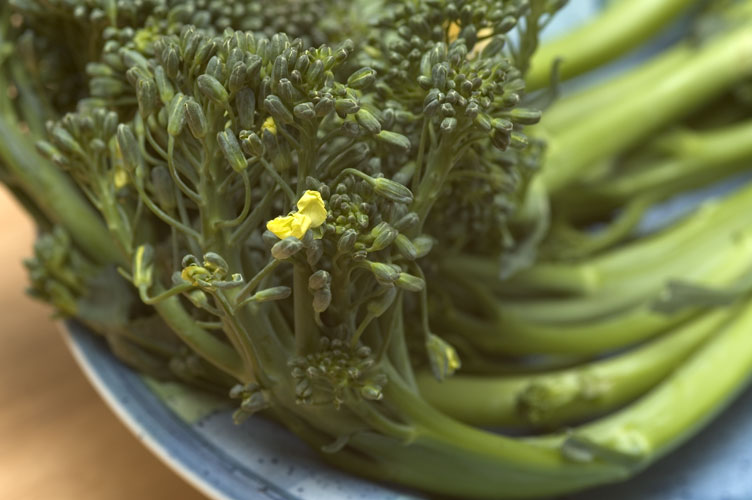
- Species: Brassica oleracea
- Hybrid parentage: B. o. var. italica (broccoli) × B. o. var. alboglabra (gai lan)

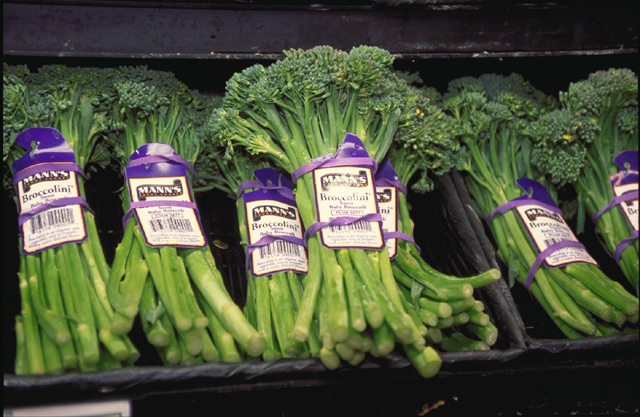
US Broccolini

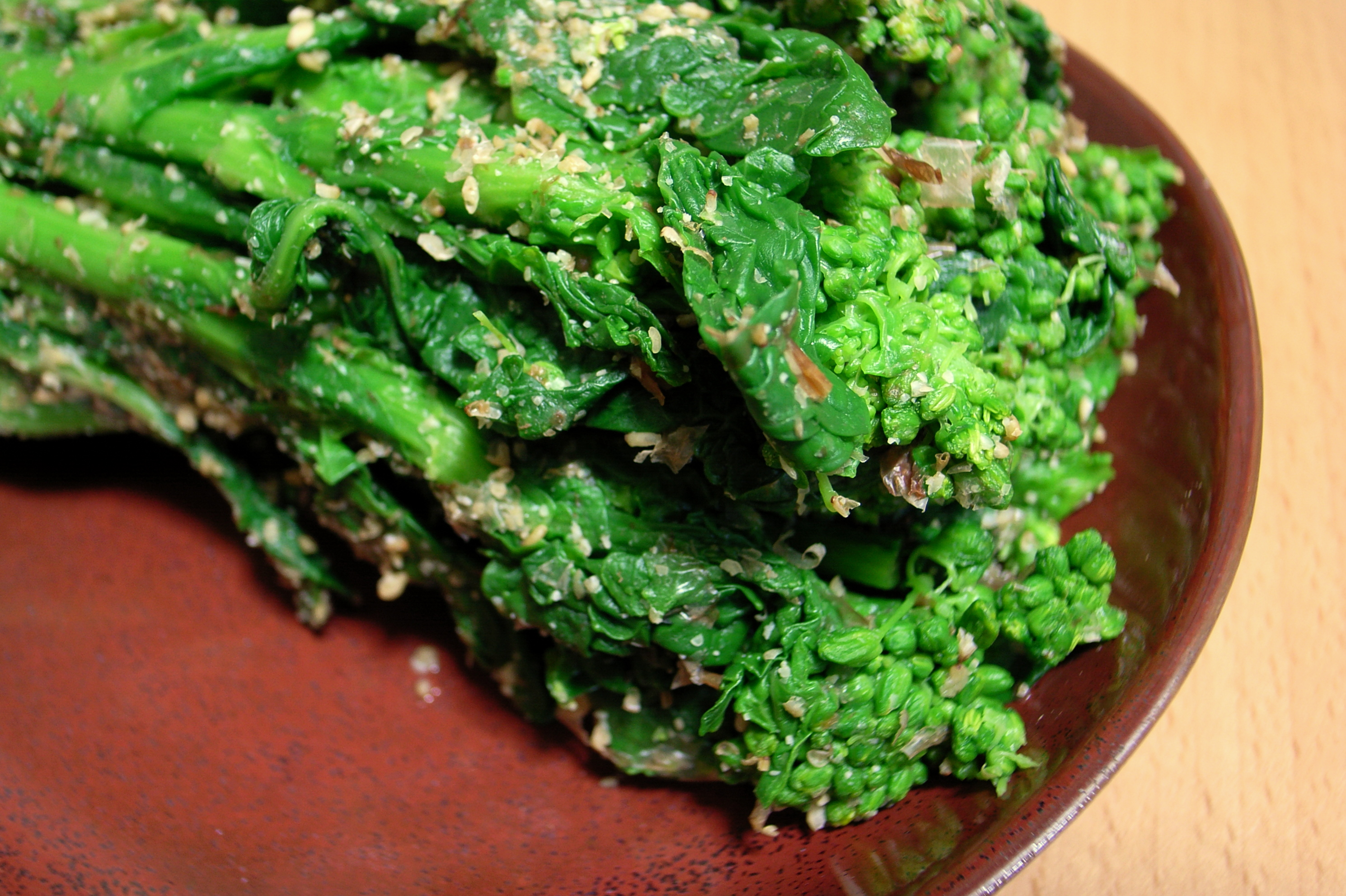
Broccolini dressed with sesame sauce

Broccolini, Aspabroc, Bimi, baby broccoli or tenderstem broccoli, is a green vegetable similar to broccoli but with smaller florets and longer, thin stalks. It is a hybrid of broccoli and gai lan (which is sometimes referred to as "Chinese kale" or "Chinese broccoli"), both of them cultivar groups of Brassica oleracea. In the United States, the name Broccolini is a registered trademark of Mann Packing.

== History ==
Broccolini was originally developed over eight years by the Sakata Seed Company of Yokohama, Japan, as a hybrid of broccoli and gai lan, rather than as the product of genetic modification. It was developed to create a milder-tasting vegetable which could grow in hotter climates than broccoli, to expand Sakata's broccoli market.

Sakata partnered with Sanbon Incorporated in 1994 to begin growing the product commercially in Mexico under the name Asparation, implying a similarity to asparagus due to its slim, edible stem. After first becoming available in US markets in 1996, in 1998, Sakata began a partnership with Mann Packing Company in Salinas, California, and marketed the product as Broccolini. New forms of Broccolini continue to be developed, including purple broccolini.

== Description ==
Broccolini has a structure similar to sprouting-type broccoli. It grows to 80 cm (31 in), with a slender elongated stem that is 15–30 cm (5.9–11.8 in) long. It is annual or biennial, herbaceous, and glabrous.

== Culinary use ==
The entire vegetable (leaves, young stems, unopened flower shoots, and flowers) is edible. Its flavor is sweet, with notes of both broccoli and asparagus, although it is not closely related to the latter.

Common cooking methods include sautéing, steaming, boiling, and stir frying. According to a 2005 study assessing how Australians cooked broccolini, the majority used steaming, with fewer choosing stir-frying, and a small minority ate it raw or in a salad.

=== Nutrition ===
Broccolini is a source of vitamin A, vitamin C and vitamin K, folate and glucosinolates.

Broccolini contains a profile of phenolic acids similar to other vegetables in the Brassica family, most notably containing flavonoids. Research into flavonoids in broccolini leaves has suggested they can inhibit the growth of some cancers. Such research has found that common cooking methods reduce broccolini's phenolic acid content, particularly boiling.

== Production ==
=== Climate ===
Broccolini grows in cool climates and is intolerant of extreme climates. It is more sensitive to cold temperatures than broccoli, but less sensitive to hot temperatures.

=== Growth and distribution ===
Broccolini takes 50–60 days to grow after being transplanted. It is harvested once the heads are fully developed but are not flowering. By cutting off the head, the harvest time is extended as new side shoots of smaller heads will grow. Unlike other cruciferous vegetables, which are harvested once per growth cycle, broccolini is harvested 3 to 5 times in a growth cycle, depending on growing conditions. Further unlike broccoli, the stalk is inedible; rather, the side shoots are harvested and consumed.

After being harvested, the produce is cooled to 0 °C (32 °F), preventing the flower heads developing to maintain quality. Shelf life can be further extended with the use of modified atmosphere packaging.

In the United States, broccolini is grown in California during the summer and in Arizona during the winter.

=== Produce reference ===
The International Federation for Produce Standards assigns it the price look-up code 3277, "baby broccoli". It is also known as asparation, asparations, "sweet baby broccoli", broccoletti, and broccolette "Italian sprouting broccoli". It is sold under the registered trademarks Bimi and Tenderstem.

== See also ==
- Rapini
