= Joseph Jakob Plenck =

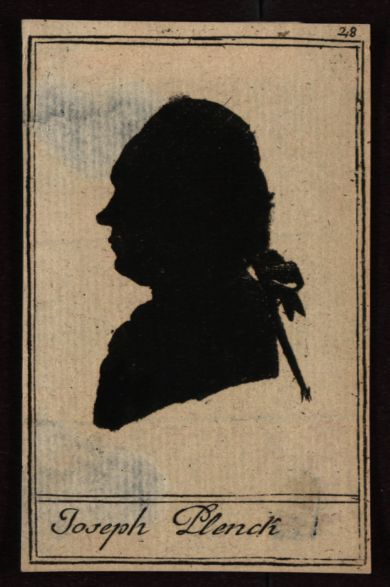
Silhouette of Joseph Jakob Plenck

Joseph Jakob Ritter Plenk or Plenck (28 November 1738 – 24 August 1807) was a physician and polymath in the Holy Roman Empire. He is now known as a pioneer dermatologist.

== Life ==
Plenck was born on 28 November 1738 in Vienna, although some sources give a birth year of 1732. He graduated at the University of Vienna in 1763, and was a follower of Heinrich Johann Nepomuk von Crantz. An academic at the University of Basel in 1770, he then taught at Tymau, Buda and Pesth. In 1783 he moved to the Josephinum in Vienna. He died on 24 August 1807.

In 1861, botanist Siegfried Reisseck published Plenckia, a genus of flowering plants from South America, belonging to the family Celastraceae and named in honour of Joseph Jakob Plenck.

== Works ==
Plenck was a prolific writer, on subjects including surgery. In 1776 he published a classification of skin diseases, Doctrina de morbis cutaneis. It introduced a consistent system, dividing dermatosis into 14 classes.
