= A-choy =

Variety of lettuce

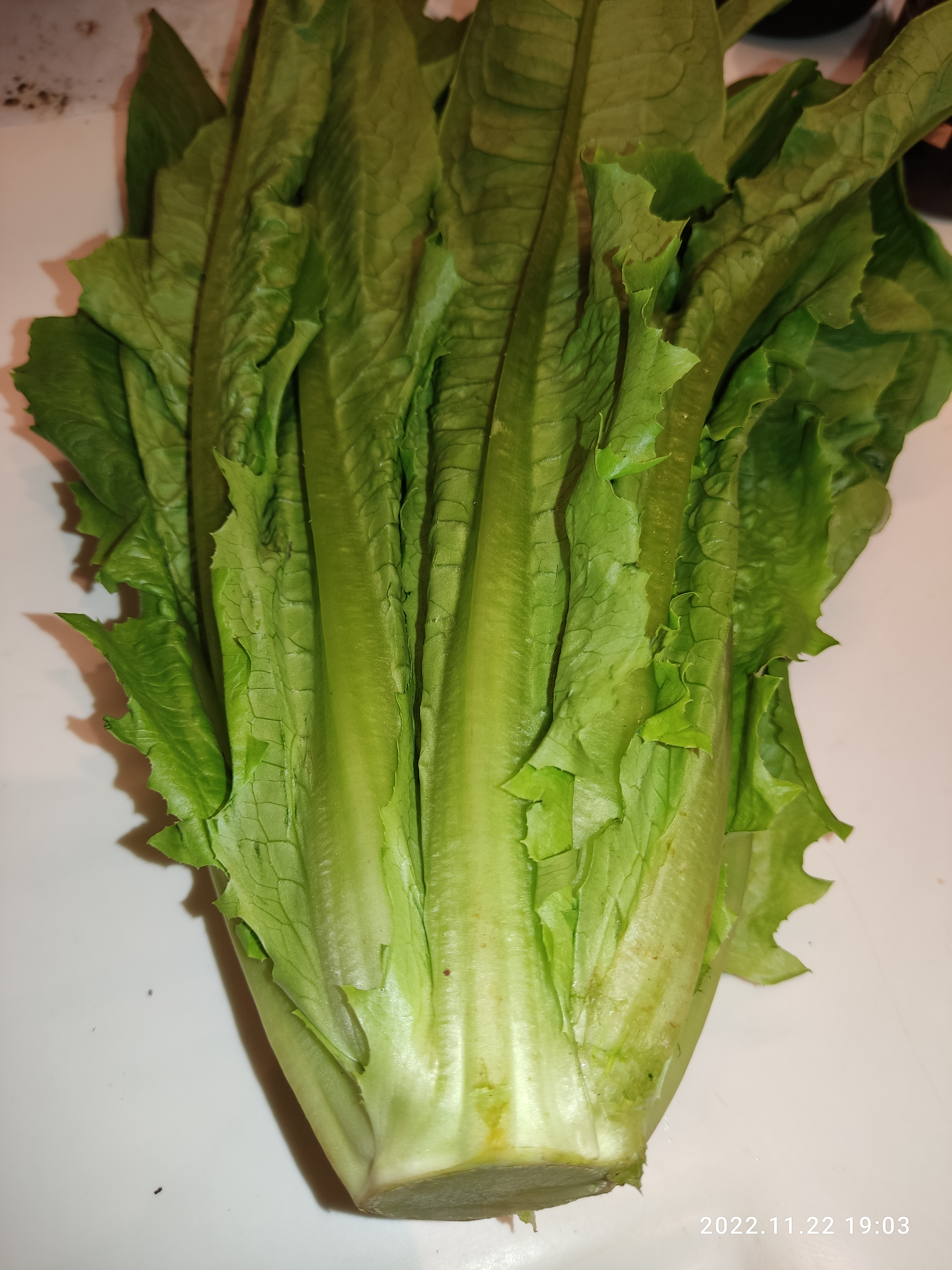
- An image of an A-Choy in November 2022
- Genus: Lactuca
- Species: Lactuca sativa

A-choy (also known as aa choy, sword choy, or yau mak choy in English) is a leafy green vegetable that is a variety of lettuce, scientifically classified under Lactuca sativa, a species in the Asteraceae family. Native to Southern Taiwan, the a-choy is a staple of Taiwanese cuisine that is well known for its crisp stalks, tender leaves, and slightly sweet, mild flavor. The stem portion of the a-choy is known as the celtuce or stem lettuce, and is often used as a vegetable in its own right.

Common pests that affect the a-choy plant include aphids, cabbage worms, slugs, snails, and flea beetles.

== Appearance ==
The A-Choy exhibits an upright growth habit, with mature plants typically reaching heights of 12 to 18 inches (30 to 45 centimeters) and spreading 12 to 24 inches (30 to 60 centimeters) in width. The plant features a thin root with a short, thick, and pale green stem that is approximately 0.2 to 0.4 inches (0.5 to 1 centimeter) in diameter at the base. Clusters of alternating, elongated, and slightly ruffled leaves grow from the top of the stem, each leaf measuring about 6 to 12 inches (15 to 30 centimeters) in length and 3 to 5 inches (7.5 to 12.5 centimeters) in width. The leaves resemble those of romaine lettuce but are typically longer and narrower, offering a crunch similar to that of broccoli stalks or kohlrabi.

A-choy
- Traditional Chinese: 油麥菜; A 菜
- Simplified Chinese: 油麦菜; A 菜
Transcriptions
Standard Mandarin
- Hanyu Pinyin: yóumàicài A cài
- Bopomofo: ㄧㄡˊ ㄇㄞˋ ㄘㄞˋ; A ㄘㄞˋ
Yue: Cantonese
- Jyutping: jau4 mak6 coi3 A coi3

Alternative Hokkien name
- Traditional Chinese: 萵仔菜
Transcriptions
Southern Min
- Hokkien POJ: e-á-tshài

== Etymology ==
The term "A-Choy" originates from the Taiwanese Hokkien pronunciation of e-á-tshài (萵仔菜), in which the beginning sound of the word sounds similar to the letter "A" in English, creating the common colloquial Taiwanese Chinese term for A-Choy, "A 菜". When the term was translated into English, the Chinese word for vegetable, "菜" (read as cài in Mandarin, and "choy" in Cantonese) was added at the end of the name, thus coining the term "A-Choy".

In Cantonese speaking areas such as Guangdong Province and Hong Kong, A-Choy is known as Yau Mak Choy (油麥菜), whereas in the rest of Mainland China, the vegetable is simply known as You Mai or Xiang Shui Sheng Cai. In Taiwan, the term "You Mai Cai" may instead refer to Romaine lettuce.

== Cultivation ==
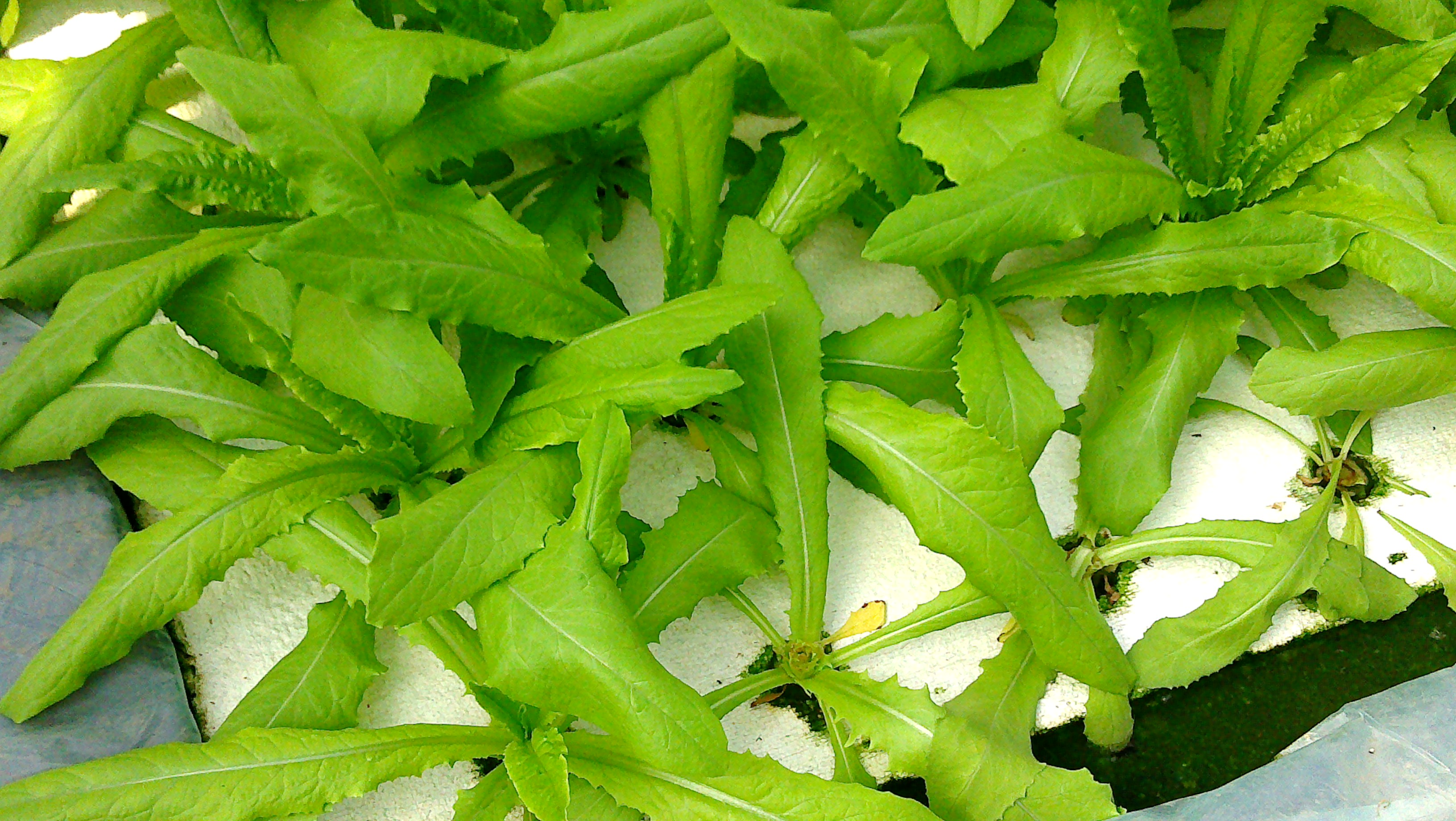
A-Choy being grown

A-Choy thrives in various climates, particularly excelling in tropical, subtropical, and monsoonal environments. Cultivation during cooler months is advisable to prevent premature bolting. It grows best in well-drained soil rich in organic matter, with a pH range of 6.0 to 7.5. Regular watering is essential to maintain soil moisture, but care should be taken to avoid over-watering, which can lead to root rot. Temperatures between 15 °C to 20 °C (59 °F to 68 °F) are preferable for the plant and the plant thrives in small gardens and is suitable for corner cultivation. The plant reaches maturity in approximately 30 to 45 days from sowing. Harvesting is typically done when the plant reaches 12 to 18 inches (30 to 45 centimeters) in height, with both the stem (celtuce) and leaves (A-Choy) being edible.

== Culinary Usages ==
=== Nutrition ===
Per 100 grams, it provides approximately 18 kilocalories, making it a low-calorie food option. It contains 3.65 grams of carbohydrates (about 2.8% of the recommended daily allowance), 0.85 grams of protein (1.5% RDA), and 0.30 grams of total fat (1% RDA). Dietary fiber content is notable at 1.7 grams (4.5% RDA), aiding digestive health.

==== Vitamins ====
- Vitamin A: 3,500 IU (117% RDA)
- Vitamin C: 19.5 mg (32.5% RDA)
- Folate: 46 μg (11.5% RDA)
- Niacin: 0.550 mg (3.5% RDA)
- Pantothenic acid: 0.183 mg (3.5% RDA)
- Pyridoxine (Vitamin B6): 0.050 mg (4% RDA)
- Riboflavin (Vitamin B2): 0.070 mg (6% RDA)
- Thiamin (Vitamin B1): 0.055 mg (5% RDA)

==== Minerals ====
- Calcium: 39 mg (4% RDA)
- Iron: 0.55 mg (7% RDA)
- Magnesium: 28 mg (7% RDA)
- Manganese: 0.688 mg (11% RDA)
- Phosphorus: 29 mg (4% RDA)
- Zinc: 0.27 mg (2.5% RDA)

=== Cuisine ===
A-Choy can be prepared by stir-frying with ingredients such as garlic and fermented black beans, or by blanching and dressing with oyster sauce. The stems are often peeled and sliced for use in pickles, stir-fries, and soups.

== Gallery ==
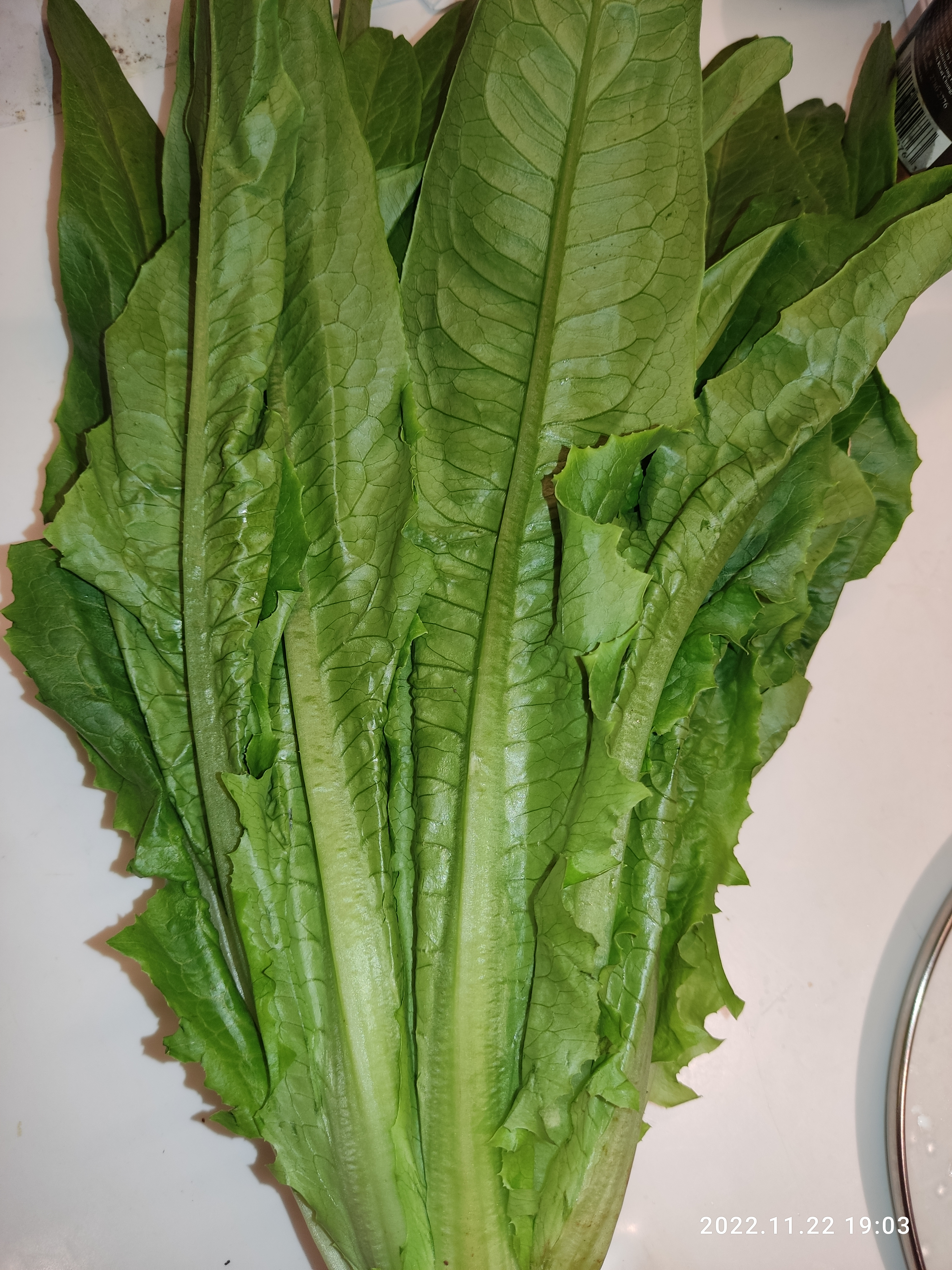
A-Choy

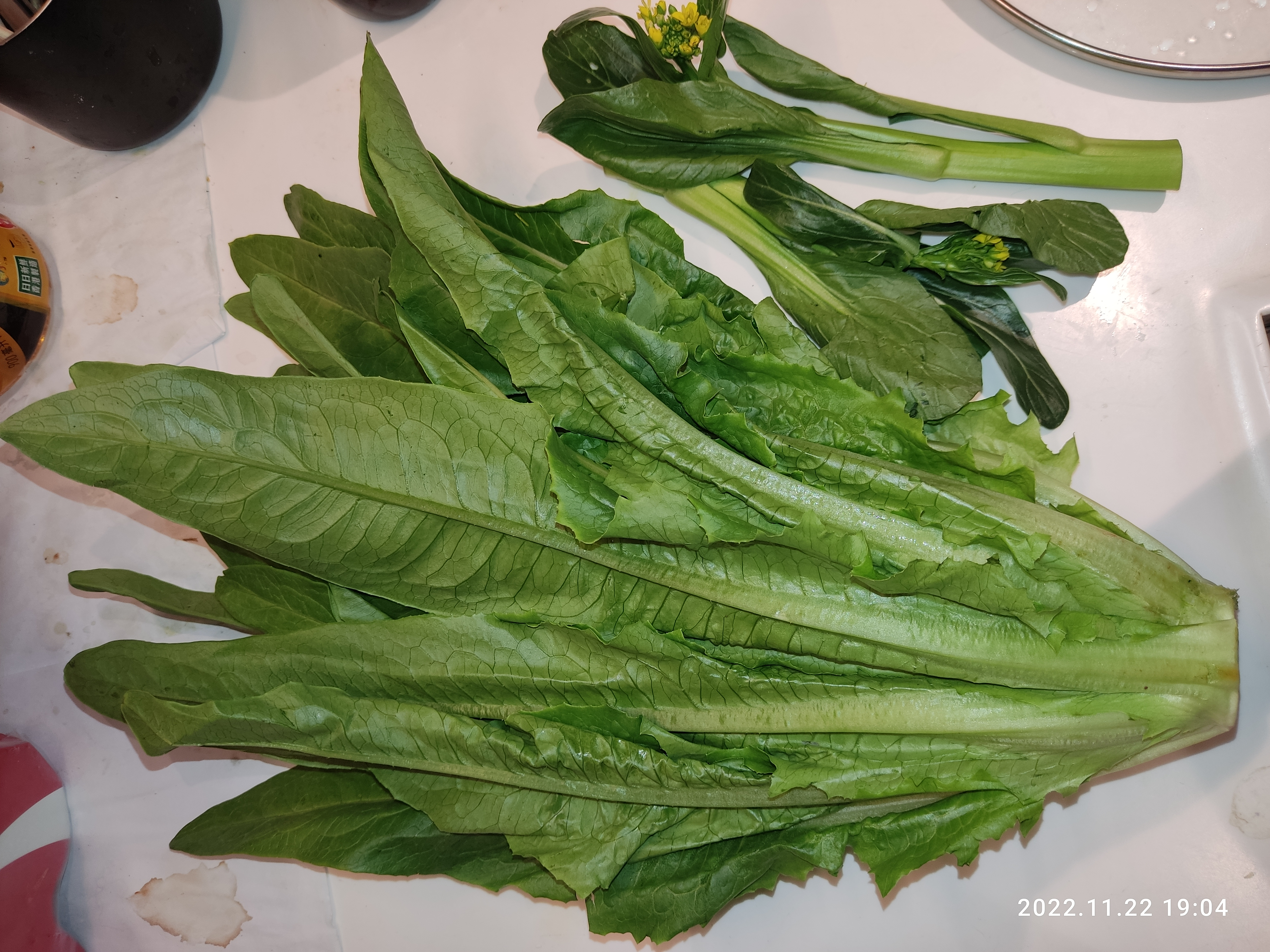
A-Choy laid out

== See also ==
- Gai Choy
- Romaine Lettuce
- Bok Choy
- Gai Lan
- Choy Sum
